= 1793 in poetry =

Nationality words link to articles with information on the nation's poetry or literature (for instance, Irish or France).

== Events ==
- Summer – William Wordsworth tours western England and Wales (passing by Tintern Abbey). His first poems are published this year.

== Works published ==
=== United Kingdom ===
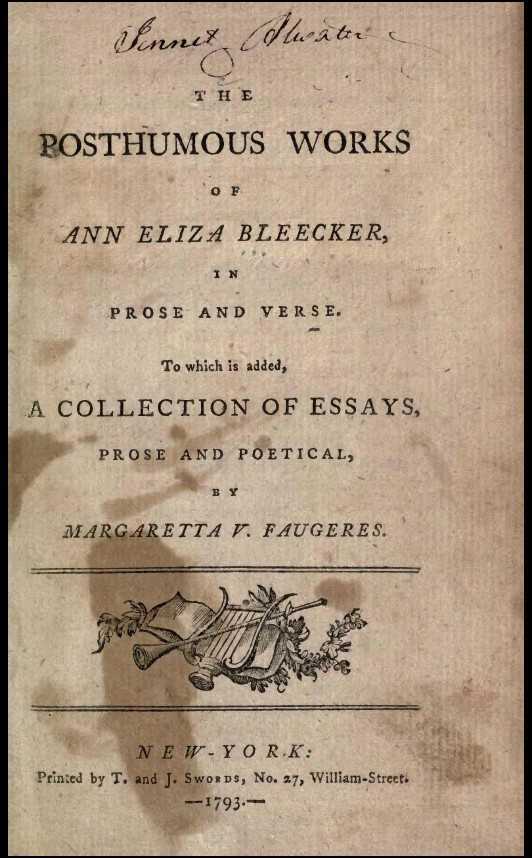
Title page of The Posthumous Works of Ann Eliza Bleecker

- William Blake:
  - America: A prophecy, illuminated book with 18 relief-etched plates
  - For Children, illuminated book with 18 intaglio plates
  - Visions of the Daughters of Albion, illuminated book with 11 relief-etched plates
- Lady Sophia Burell, Poems
- Robert Burns, Poems Chiefly in the Scottish Dialect
- Joseph Ritson, The English Anthology, anthology
- Charlotte Smith, The Emigrants, dedicated to William Cowper
- George Thomson, A Select Collection of Original Scottish Airs for the Voice, published in four volumes from this year to 1799; Volume 1 has 59 songs by Robert Burns
- William Wordsworth:
  - Descriptive Sketches
  - An Evening Walk
- Ann Yearsley, Reflections on the Death of Louis XVI

=== United States ===
- Richard Alsop, American Poems
- Ann Eliza Bleecker, The Posthumous Works of Ann Eliza Bleecker, including 36 poems, 23 letters, an unfinished short historical novel, and a captivity narrative (also including Margarette Faugeres's A Collection of Essays, Prose and Poetical), prose and poetry
- Philip Freneau, "On the Anniversary of the Storming of the Bastille", in which the French Revolution is endorsed
- Elihu Hubbard Smith, editor, American Poems, Selected and Original, the first notable American poetry anthology; contains poems largely from the Hartford Wits group of Connecticut poets, including poems by friends of Smith such as John Trumbull, Joel Barlow, Timothy Dwight and Lemuel Hopkins, as well as Philip Freneau, William Livingston, Sarah Wentworth Morton and Robert Treat Paine; Litchfield, Connecticut: Printed by Collier and Buel;

=== Other ===
- Solomon Gessner, works, translated into French from the original German of the Swiss poet; in three volumes, published starting 1786, with the last volume published this year; posthumous after 1788

== Births ==
Death years link to the corresponding "[year] in poetry" article:

- June 1 – Henry Francis Lyte (died 1847), Scottish-born Anglican priest and hymn-writer
- July 13 – John Clare (died 1864), English "peasant poet"
- August 25 – John Neal (died 1876), eccentric and influential American writer, critic, lecturer, and activist
- September 25 – Felicia Hemans (died 1835), English poet
- October 11 – Maria James (died 1868), Welsh-born American poet and domestic servant

== Deaths ==
Birth years link to the corresponding "[year] in poetry" article:

- March 29 – Charlotte Brooke (born c. 1740), Irish poet
- July 4 – Antoine-Marin Lemierre (born 1733), French poet and playwright
- September 16 – Johann Adolf Schlegel (born 1721), German poet and pastor

== See also ==
- Poetry
