= Poetry Wars: Verse and Politics in the American Revolution and Early Republic =

2018 book by Colin Wells

- Author: Colin Wells
- Language: English
- Series: Early American Studies
- Subject: Political poetry, American Revolution, First Party System
- Publisher: University of Pennsylvania Press
- Publication date: 2018
- Publication place: United States
- Pages: 352
- ISBN: 978-0-8122-4965-1

Poetry Wars: Verse and Politics in the American Revolution and Early Republic is a 2018 book by Colin Wells. The book examines the role of political poetry in American public life from the Stamp Act crisis of 1765 through the War of 1812. Wells argues that verse functioned as a distinct cultural form through which poets on all sides of the era's political conflicts sought to contest the authority of official texts, shape public narratives, and claim to speak on behalf of the people. Poetic warfare developed from the anti-imperial versifications of the Revolutionary period through the partisan battles between Federalists and Republicans in the 1790s to the eventual decline of political verse in the early nineteenth century. The book is based on Wells's examination of hundreds of poems published in newspapers, broadsides, and pamphlets.

== Summary ==
Wells reconstructs the world of political verse in America between the Stamp Act crisis of 1765 through the Revolutionary War, the early party system, and the War of 1812, arguing that this body of poetry constituted a distinct literary form whose cultural significance lay in its orientation outward — toward other printed texts circulating in the public sphere. Rather than treating political poems as self-contained works to be judged by aesthetic standards, Wells reads them as acts of discursive intervention: responses to, and transformations of, royal proclamations, congressional declarations, newspaper essays, political speeches, and rival poems. What earlier critics dismissed as derivative imitation (the tendency of these poets to echo, parody, and rework existing texts) Wells identifies as the defining feature of the form, a "conscious referentialism" through which poets sought to undermine the authority of political language and wrest control of public narratives. The genres that dominate the study are mostly comic and combative: parodies, satires, lampoons, burlesques, mock panegyrics, and mock epics, all produced in the expanding world of partisan newspapers, broadsides, and pamphlets.

The account begins in the decade before the Revolution, when the Stamp Act triggered a sudden politicization of American verse. Colonial newsboys, whose annual carrier's addresses had previously offered loyal toasts to King George, began speaking as representatives of the vox populi, confronting the monarch and framing the tax as an assault on liberty. Longer poems modeled on the Augustan satires of Pope, Swift, and Churchill — such as Benjamin Church's The Times and the anonymous Oppression: A Poem — situated the crisis within a transatlantic narrative of political corruption. Wells identifies a practice he calls "versification," in which poets parodied the official language of royal proclamations, rendering British authority as "mere language" and thereby undercutting its political and linguistic power. The exchange surrounding John Dickinson's "Liberty Song" of 1768, its Loyalist "Parody," and the subsequent "Parody Parodized" established what would become the signature dynamic of American political verse: a chain of textual attack and counterattack in which each new poem sought to negate the ideological claims of its predecessor. Though most of the known poets were educated professionals (lawyers, clergymen, and merchants) a considerable number of poems were composed by writers who identified themselves as mechanics, recent immigrants, women, or soldiers, lending the poetic public sphere a broader social base than its elite reputation suggests.

During the war itself, verse warfare tracked the military conflict. John Trumbull's mock epic M'Fingal (1776, revised 1782) satirized the Loyalist position by staging a debate between the Patriot Honorius and the foolish Squire M'Fingal, drawing on Samuel Butler's Hudibras to cast the Loyalists as adherents of a lost cause. Wells traces how Trumbull's revision between editions reflected the changing political landscape: the 1776 version served as wartime propaganda, while the 1782 four-canto edition introduced competing voices and a more ambiguous treatment of mob violence that anticipated the partisan conflicts of the 1790s. On the Loyalist side, Jonathan Odell produced ambitious satires like "The Word of Congress" and Joseph Stansbury composed private songs whose blend of defiance and melancholy registered the psychological cost of finding oneself on the losing side of history. A parallel strand follows what Wells calls the "poetry of conspiracy," rooted in the literary tradition of Milton's Paradise Lost and Pope's Dunciad. Philip Freneau's anti-Gage poems, including A Voyage to Boston (1775), portrayed the British command as a demonic cabal and cast the poet as a spy exposing their designs; Loyalist poets like Myles Cooper and Isaac Hunt used the same framework in reverse, depicting rebel leaders as Satanic demagogues. This mutual rhetoric of conspiracy would carry directly into the partisan battles of the 1790s.

During the early national period, the logic of poetic warfare was redirected toward domestic partisan struggle and contributed to the formation of the first party system. The Jay Treaty controversy of 1795 produced a wave of Federalist mock epics and Republican counter-poems. The Hartford Wits, Trumbull, Timothy Dwight, Lemuel Hopkins, Richard Alsop, and Theodore Dwight, organized collective satiric projects such as "The Echo" and "The Political Green-House," reproducing and ridiculing Republican newspaper prose in verse. Wells pays particular attention to "liberty" as a contested keyword: Federalist poets attacked what they saw as the abuse of Revolutionary language by Republican demagogues, while Republicans accused Federalists of abandoning the principles of 1776. The Wits' "Echo" series also turned the rhetoric of liberty against the nation's own failures, highlighting the inconsistency of American freedom rhetoric in the context of slavery and the marginalization of African Americans and Native Americans. The Alien and Sedition Acts of 1798 and the Illuminati scare intensified this dynamic, as Federalist conspiracy verse reached its peak with works accusing Jeffersonians of participating in a global plot to destroy religion and social order.

The election of 1800 marked a turning point. Republican poets celebrated Jefferson's victory in panegyric hymns framing it as the culmination of the struggle begun during the Revolution. Federalists responded by doubling down on "linguistic unmasking" — mining Jefferson's speeches, letters, and published writings, including Notes on the State of Virginia, for material to expose what they regarded as his true character. Jefferson the radical democrat, Jefferson the crank naturalist fascinated by mammoths, Jefferson the slaveholder whose racial theories contradicted his egalitarian rhetoric — these caricatures multiplied across Federalist newspapers. Yet their varied and sometimes contradictory nature limited their satiric effectiveness, and Federalist poets gradually confronted the failure of satire to reverse the Democratic ascendancy. By the late 1790s and early 1800s, Federalist and Republican poets had begun to mirror one another's strategies so closely that the critical tactics that once differentiated them became nearly indistinguishable. Some Federalist writers retreated into what William Dowling has called a "retreat from history," proposing in Joseph Dennie's Port Folio a conception of poetry as private aesthetic pleasure rather than public political weapon — a development Wells identifies as an early sign of the "lyricization of poetry" that would reshape American literary culture in the nineteenth century.

The final phase is the resurgence of literary warfare during the Embargo crisis of 1807–1809 and the War of 1812. Federalist poets of the embargo period adopted a new populist strategy, voicing the suffering of ordinary sailors and laborers in ballads and songs. This revival ended with the War of 1812, during which patriotic ballads celebrating American military victories — especially Admiral Perry's at the Battle of Lake Erie — overwhelmed Federalist antiwar verse. The Hartford Convention of 1814–1815 and its association with secessionism permanently discredited Federalist opposition, and Republican celebrations of the war's end marked the effective close of both the first party system and the poetic warfare that had accompanied it. In the Epilogue, Wells documents the afterlife of political verse into the antebellum period, noting that the Romantic movement redefined poetry in terms incompatible with the outward-oriented, intertextual poetics of the earlier era, and that the energy of protest verse migrated from partisan warfare to the moral causes of abolitionism and the defense of Native American rights.

== Critics ==
Paul Gutjahr called Wells's focus on versification as a cultural form a "great — and much-needed — contribution" to the literature on the early American republic. He predicted the book would be "of wide interest to literary scholars, American cultural and political historians, and, in particular, those interested in the print cultures surrounding the nation's founding."

Scott M. Reznick compared the work favorably to Eric Slauter's The State as a Work of Art for its use of digitized archival sources to transform understanding of early American political culture. Reznick identified the book's detailed taxonomy of poetic genres (from the populist carrier's address to the elevated Augustan "satire of the times") as one of its great strengths. He cautioned that Wells occasionally took for granted causal connections "that could benefit from more empirical proof."

In her review, Susan Castillo Street wrote that the book is part of the longstanding debate over whether literary value resides in historical vividness or formal achievement, invoking Lionel Trilling's image of "the dark and bloody crossroads where literature and politics meet." She found the term "poetry wars" singularly apt for describing the heated ideological debates of the period. His prose, Street wrote, was "admirably lucid and clear" and his close readings "bristle with valuable insights." She predicted the book would "become a fundamental reference for scholars researching the literary history of this period."

Edward Larkin described it as "meticulously researched" and found its close readings of oft-dismissed poems among the book's most gratifying contributions. Larkin suggested, however, that the work might have benefited from placing political poetry in dialogue with other literary forms of the period, such as plays and essay series. "This is not so much a criticism of Wells's excellent book," he wrote, "as it is a reflection motivated by Poetry Wars."

Matthew Garrett found Wells "superb" on the political signification of generic choices and attuned to the way Federalist and Republican poetic sparring gradually emptied each side's strategies of intrinsic value. Garrett called the book "by far the best monograph on colonial American and early US verse."

Michael C. Cohen found the stakes of the poetic fights described in the book "surprisingly — even depressingly — contemporary." Cohen noticed that the book's many verse battles "begin to feel like the same battle repeated over and over again," a quality he regarded as both a virtue and a problem: a virtue because it underscored the interconnectedness of the conflicts across four decades, a problem because it exposed how easily the concept of the "public sphere" was abstracted from the specificity Wells otherwise provided.

William Huntting Howell described the work as "superbly researched, closely argued, and utterly compelling," crediting it with recovering a vast and unjustly neglected archive of late eighteenth-century American verse.

In her review of the book alongside Carrie Hyde's Civic Longing, Keri Holf said that Wells provided "a much-needed assessment not just of poetry's prevalence in American print culture but also of its 'capacity to intervene in the domain of real power.'" Holt thought that both Wells and Hyde acknowledged sectional undercurrents in early American partisan politics but did not pursue them in detail, and suggested regional dynamics of literature and politics as a productive area for future inquiry.
