= Wit =

Form of humour

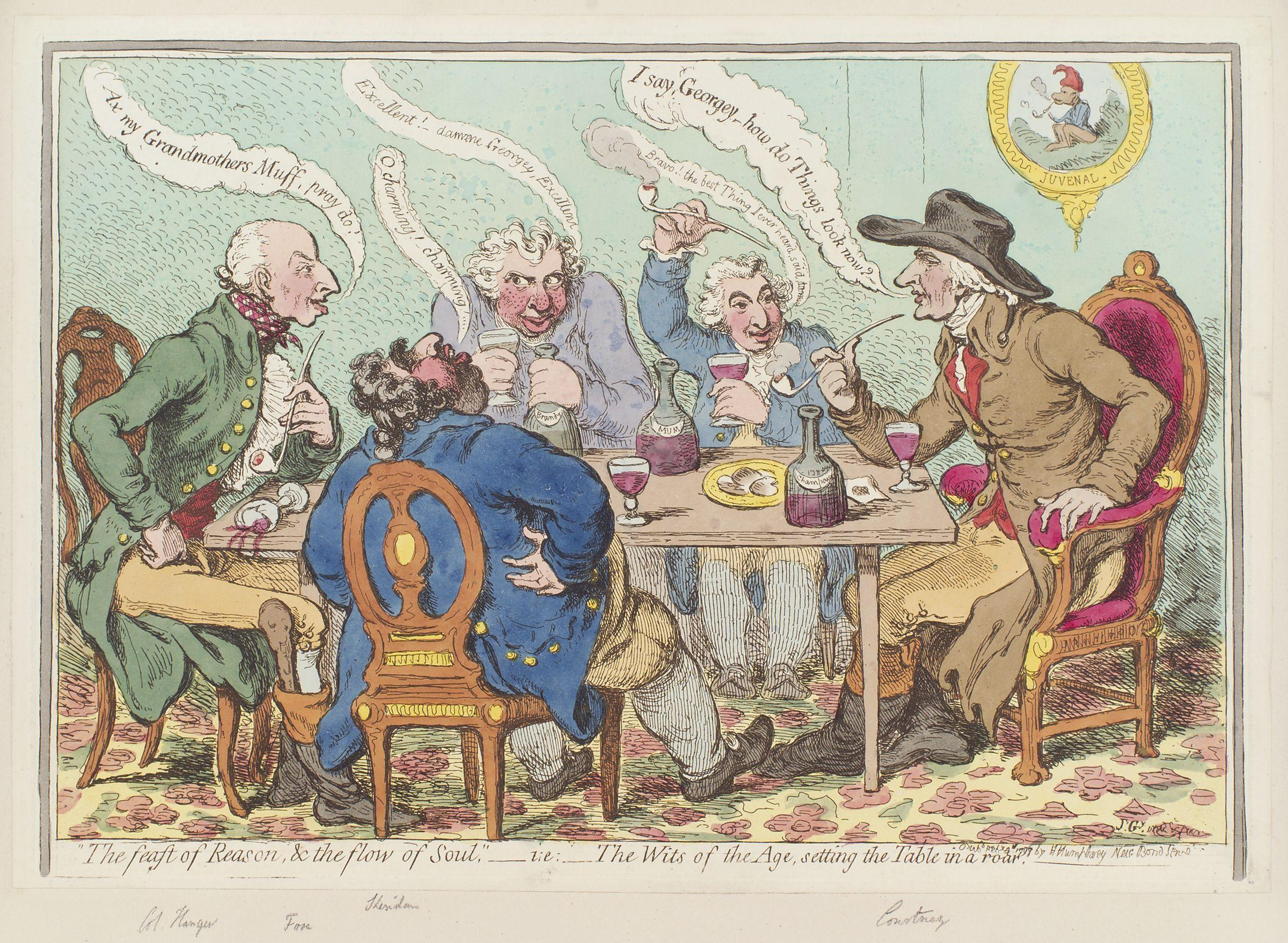
"The feast of reason..." — James Gillray (1797)

Wit is a form of intelligent humour. It is the ability to say or write things that are clever and typically funny. Someone witty, also known as a wit, is a person skilled at wit, making spontaneous one-line or single-phrase jokes. Forms of wit include the quip, repartee, and wisecrack.

== Etymology ==
From Middle English wit, from Old English witt (“understanding, intellect, sense, knowledge, consciousness, conscience”), from Proto-West Germanic *witi, from Proto-Germanic *witją (“knowledge, reason”), from the Proto-Indo-European root *weyd- (“see, know”). It shares its root with "wise" and "advise".

== Forms ==
As in the wit of Dorothy Parker's set, the Algonquin Round Table, witty remarks may be intentionally cruel (as also in many epigrams), and perhaps more ingenious than funny.

A quip is an observation or saying that has some wit but perhaps descends into sarcasm, or otherwise is short of a point. A witticism also suggests the diminutive.

Repartee is the wit of the quick answer and capping comment, the snappy comeback and the neat retort.

Metaphysical poetry as a style was prevalent in the time of English playwright William Shakespeare, who admonished pretension with the phrase "Better a witty fool than a foolish wit". It may combine word play with conceptual thinking, as a kind of verbal display requiring attention, without intending to be laugh-out-loud funny. Indeed, wit in verse can be a thin disguise for more poignant feelings. English poet John Donne is a representative of this style.

== Other uses ==
More generally, one's wits are one's intellectual powers of all types. Native wit—meaning the wits with which one is born—is closely synonymous with common sense. To live by one's wits is to be an opportunist, but not always of the scrupulous kind. To have one's wits about one is to be alert and capable of quick reasoning. To be at the end of one's wits ("I'm at wits' end") is to be immensely frustrated.

== See also ==
- Hartford Wits
- New Oxford Wits
- Oxford Wits
