= American confederation =

American confederation may refer to:

- United States of America (1781-1789), under the Articles of Confederation
- Confederate States of America (1861–1865), a secessionist state during the American Civil War
