= History of the United States (1776–1789) =

The United States of America
- 1776–1789
Colonial Period	History of the United States (1789–1815), Federalist Era
- Declaration of Independence, an 1819 portrait by John Trumbull, shows the Committee of Five submitting its draft of the Declaration of Independence to the Second Continental Congress in Philadelphia.
- Location: British America; United States
- Including: American Revolution; Confederation Period; Second Great Awakening
- Leaders: Founding Fathers of the United States, most notably The Seven Greats: John Adams; Benjamin Franklin; Alexander Hamilton; John Jay; Thomas Jefferson; James Madison; George Washington
- Key events: American Revolutionary War; Lee Resolution; United States Declaration of Independence; Treaty of Paris; Drafting and implementation of the Articles of Confederation; Philadelphia Mutiny; Shays' Rebellion; Northwest Ordinance; Ratification of the Constitution

The history of the United States from 1776 to 1789 was marked by the nation's transition from the American Revolutionary War to the establishment of a novel constitutional order.

As a result of the American Revolution, the thirteen British colonies emerged as a newly independent nation, the United States of America, between 1776 and 1789. Fighting in the American Revolutionary War started between colonial militias and the British Army in 1775. The Second Continental Congress agreed to the Lee Resolution on July 2, 1776, which formally created a new nation, and then issued the Declaration of Independence on July 4. The Articles of Confederation were ratified in 1781 to form the Congress of the Confederation. Under the leadership of General George Washington, with later support from France, the Continental Army and Navy defeated the British military, securing the independence of the Thirteen Colonies. The Confederation period continued until 1789, when the states replaced the Articles of Confederation with the Constitution of the United States, which remains the fundamental governing law of the United States.

The 1780s marked an economic downturn for the United States due to debts incurred during the Revolutionary War, Congress's inability to levy taxes, and significant inflation of the Continental dollar. Political essays such as Common Sense and The Federalist Papers had a major effect on American culture and public opinion. The Northwest Territory was created as the first federal territory in 1787, and a border dispute in this region prompted raids that escalated into the Northwest Indian War. The Revolution and the Confederation period are placed within the American Enlightenment, a period in which Age of Enlightenment ideas grew popular and prompted scientific advancement.

== Background ==
During the 17th and 18th centuries, British colonies in America were given considerable autonomy under the system of salutary neglect. This autonomy was challenged in the 1760s by several acts of the Grenville ministry, including the Stamp Act 1765 and the Quartering Acts. These acts provoked an ideological conflict between Great Britain and the Thirteen Colonies regarding the nature of the Crown's authority over colonists. Protests by the colonists began as a demand for equal rights under the British constitution, but as the dispute progressed, they took a decidedly republican political viewpoint.

From the Stamp Act of 1765 onward, disputes with London escalated. Committees of correspondence were formed between 1770 and 1773 to organize colonists that opposed British authority. Riots occurred in opposition to British taxation on tea, culminating in the Boston Tea Party on December 16, 1773, that saw dozens of men dumping massive amounts of British tea into the Boston Harbor. Great Britain responded with the even more controversial Intolerable Acts that enforced penalties on the colonies, and on Massachusetts in particular. This prompted the colonists to convene the First Continental Congress on September 5, 1774, as a unified body to oppose British authority. The American Revolutionary War began on April 19, 1775, with the Battles of Lexington and Concord.

The Second Continental Congress met in Philadelphia, Pennsylvania, in the aftermath of armed clashes in April. With all thirteen colonies represented, it immediately began to organize itself as a provisional government with control over the diplomacy and instructed the colonies to write constitutions for themselves as states. In June 1775, George Washington, a charismatic Virginia political leader with combat experience, was unanimously appointed commander of a newly organized Continental Army. The Boston campaign continued with the Continental Army besieging British-occupied Boston until the British retreated by sea to Halifax, Nova Scotia, in March 1776. The Invasion of Quebec in the northeast and southwest was also carried out by the Continental Army in the 1770s.

== American Revolution ==
=== Declaration of Independence ===
On July 2, 1776, the Second Continental Congress, meeting in Philadelphia, voted unanimously to declare independence as the "United States of America". On August 2, 1776, Congress signed the Declaration of Independence. The Second Continental Congress was not initially formed to declare independence, but to demand their rights as Englishmen. Support for independence had grown gradually in 1775 and 1776 as Great Britain refused the colonists' demands and hostilities became more pronounced. The political pamphlet Common Sense further popularized support for independence. In May 1776, the Continental Congress recommended that the colonies establish their own governments independently of Great Britain.

The drafting of the Declaration was the responsibility of a Committee of Five, which included John Adams, Thomas Jefferson, Roger Sherman, Robert Livingston, and Benjamin Franklin; it was drafted by Jefferson and revised by the others and the Congress as a whole. It contended that "all men are created equal" with "certain unalienable rights, that among these are life, liberty, and the pursuit of happiness", and that "to secure these rights governments are instituted among men, deriving their just powers from the consent of the governed", as well as listing the main colonial grievances against the crown. Thus what had begun as a rebellion demanding English rights developed into a revolution based on universal rights that was to overthrow the entire political and social order of the Americans. Jefferson expressed that he did not wish to create new arguments, but rather to present those of previous philosophers, such as those of John Locke.

The signers of the Declaration of Independence were highly educated and wealthy, and they came from the older colonial settlements. They were largely Protestant and of British descent. In the following century, the signing of the Declaration of Independence would be commemorated as Independence Day.

=== American Revolutionary War ===
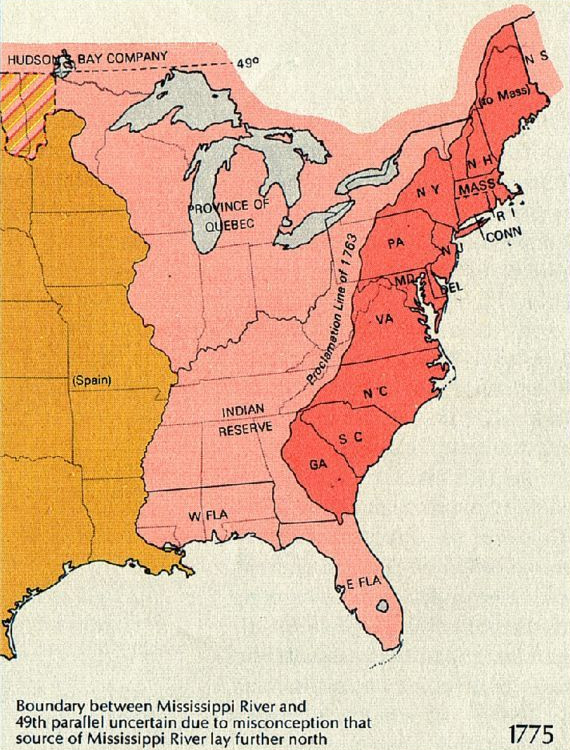
A 1775 map of British America with the Thirteen Colonies shown in red.

==== Northern theater (1776–1777) ====
The 13-star blue canton flag design that replaced the Continental Union Flag following the Flag Act of 1777.

The task of organizing the Continental Army fell to General Washington, and the Second Continental Congress oversaw military action through war boards. At the onset of the war, the army had little equipment or formal training. Washington assigned Prussian Baron Friedrich Wilhelm von Steuben to train the army, and the baron's military experience produced a strong military for the United States. To supply the army, Washington pressured Congress for additional supplies, but Congress had no power to tax, and funding from each state was not compulsory and there was never a sufficient amount.

The New York and New Jersey campaign began in July 1776 as British reinforcements landed in New York City. The British counteroffensive won the Battle of Long Island, and subsequent battles resulted in alternating American and British victories. The port of New York City and its strategic harbor remained the British political and military headquarters in America for the remainder of the war, and became the destination for Loyalist refugees from throughout. The Continental Army was routed to New Jersey, and the British army failed to take control of New England. The campaign shifted to Washington's favor after he led a crossing of the Delaware River that resulted in a victory in the Battle of Trenton, followed immediately by another victory in the Battle of Princeton, boosting American morale.

In early 1777, a grand British strategic plan, the Saratoga campaign, was drafted in London. The plan called for two British armies to converge on Albany, New York from the north and south, dividing the colonies in two and separating New England from the rest. General John Burgoyne led British soldiers from Montreal in June 1777, engaging in skirmishes with American forces. American General Horatio Gates was appointed as Northern Army commander. The forces of Burgoyne and Gates fought in the Saratoga campaign, with the British forces surrendering after the Second Battle of Saratoga. The forces of British commander William Howe were supposed to provide reinforcements from the south, but he instead engaged in the Philadelphia campaign, taking the capital city of Philadelphia.

The American victory at Saratoga led the French into a military alliance with the United States through the Treaty of Alliance in 1778. France was soon joined by Spain and the Netherlands, both major naval powers with an interest in undermining British strength. Britain now faced a major European war, and the involvement of the French navy neutralized their previous dominance of the war on the sea. Britain was without allies and faced the prospect of invasion across the English Channel.

==== Western theater (1776–1782) ====
Throughout the Revolutionary War, smaller battles and ambushes were fought west of the Appalachian Mountains along the southwestern area of Canada and in American territories. Fearing the expansion of the United States and encouraged by the British, several Native American tribes launched attacks against Americans. Battles and massacres took place between the Continental Army and Native American fighters as well as against non-combatants and farms. In the final years of the war, Great Britain stopped providing much of its support for Native American tribes, and the United States won in the western theater with strict terms of surrender.

==== Southern theater (1778–1781) ====
Except for an attempt to take Charleston in 1776, Great Britain did not attack the southern states of Georgia or South Carolina in the early years of the war. Most fighting in the South had been carried out by the Cherokee. Following the failure at Saratoga, however, Great Britain moved its focus to the South, and the Capture of Savannah occurred in 1778. The United States had not been prepared for a campaign in the South, and American General Benjamin Lincoln was appointed to the South to raise a militia. The Siege of Charleston took place in 1780, and the British captured this city as well. North Carolina, South Carolina, and Georgia had higher Loyalist populations than other states, further contributing to British victories in the southern theater. After the Siege of Charleston, British General Lord Cornwallis took charge of the British forces in the Southern United States. Victory in the Battle of Camden in 1780 reiterated British control over the South.

Cornwallis advanced his forces into North Carolina, depending on Loyalists to join his forces as he went, but few joined him. General Nathanael Greene routed the British forces, preventing them from taking North Carolina. Against his instructions to defend the occupied South, Cornwallis moved his forces north to Virginia. Greene's forces moved south and reclaimed Georgia and South Carolina. Cornwallis positioned his forces in Yorktown, Virginia in hope of defeating the forces of the French General Lafayette. The French navy prevented the British navy from providing assistance in the Battle of the Chesapeake, and Washington and Lafayette's forces laid siege to Yorktown. Cornwallis surrendered on October 19, 1781, effectively ending the American Revolutionary War. King George III and Prime Minister Lord North wished to mount another campaign, but Parliament overruled them, forbidding any further conflict.

=== Treaty of Paris ===
King George III formally acknowledged American independence and ordered the end of hostilities on December 5, 1782. Peace negotiations took place in Paris, with John Adams, Benjamin Franklin, and John Jay representing the United States. Negotiations concluded with the Treaty of Paris, which legally recognized the United States as an independent country. Great Britain agreed to give up portions of southwestern Canada, though the boundary with the rest of British Canada remained unsettled. Some elements of the treaty were controversial among Americans, including those that recognized the monetary debts owed to Loyalists and those that critics felt challenged the status of each state government as a sovereign entity.

On November 25, 1783, George Washington led a procession through New York City on horseback as the final British soldiers boarded their boats to leave the harbor. Victory celebrations were held in the city, and the day would be remembered as Evacuation Day. On December 23, 1783, Washington resigned his commission as commander-in-chief of the Continental Army. The Treaty of Paris was ratified by Congress on January 14, 1784.

== Confederation period ==
=== Articles of Confederation ===
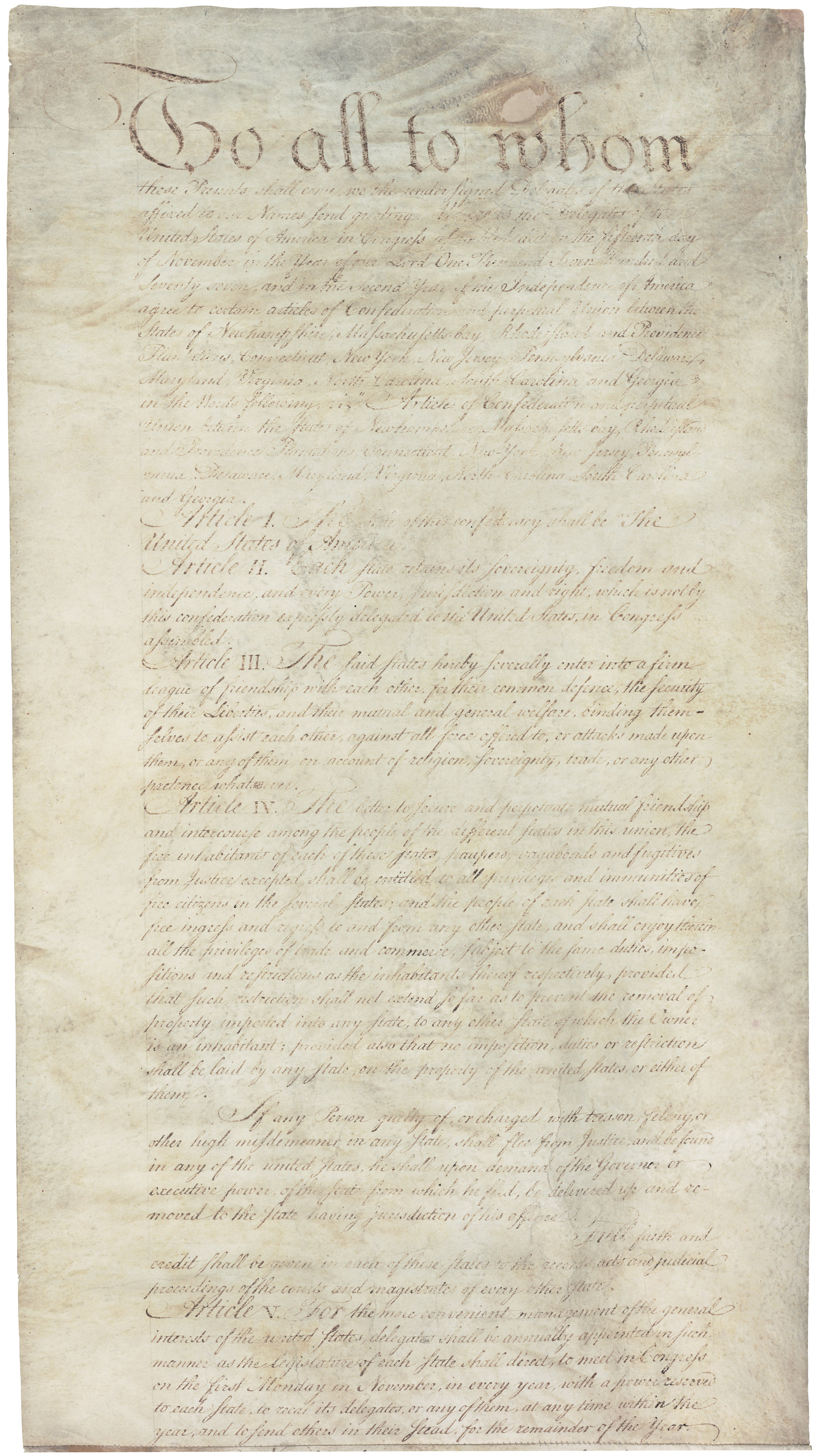
Preamble through Article V of the Articles of Confederation

The Articles of Confederation were proposed by the Continental Congress on November 15, 1777, and they were ratified on March 1, 1781. It replaced the administrative boards and appellate courts that Congress had created during the early stages of the Revolutionary War. While the Articles of Confederation granted certain powers to the Congress of the Confederation, they also imposed restrictions that made governance difficult. These restrictions were by design, as many Americans feared that a strong central government would be too similar to the British monarchy. The powers of the central government were limited primarily to war, diplomacy, and resolving interstate disputes. It lacked powers to pass economic legislation, causing economic decline as it proved unable to pay its debts. Acts of Congress required high majorities to be passed, and amendments to the Articles required unanimous approval by the states.

Most governing was carried out by state governments during the Confederation Period. Though Pennsylvania was the only state to use official political parties, informal partisanship developed across the new nation in the 1780s. Divisions emerged over how powerful the central government should be, how debts should be managed, and how Western settlement should be carried out. The factions disagreed on how democratic the nation should be, influenced by fears of both tyranny by elites and mob rule by the masses.

The political and economic troubles caused civil conflict within the states. Mutinies occurred in Pennsylvania and New Jersey in January 1781, soldiers marched on the capital in June 1783, and a coup against General Washington was considered among military officers in Newburgh. The unrest culminated in Shays' Rebellion in the winter of 1786–1787, in which protests against the handling of debts in Massachusetts led to an armed uprising. The states declined to fund a military force, and Massachusetts was forced to fund its own state force. Though Shays' Rebellion was short-lived, it became a strong argument for those in favor of reforming the national government.

=== Foreign affairs ===
Congress oversaw foreign policy, but the states had the final say in their own foreign relations, with each state ratifying treaties individually. Relations with Great Britain were still troubled after the war. Many states did not comply with the terms of the Treaty of Paris regarding the treatment of British nationals, and the British Army maintained a presence in the western territories. Britain also hurt American trade through restrictions on American products to promote Canadian growth. The Shelburne ministry had been lenient in the negotiation of the Treaty of Paris, but this proved controversial, prompting a change in government that resulted in much colder relations with the United States.

As economic conditions worsened, Congress failed to repay its debts to the countries that provided military support during the war: France, Spain, and the Netherlands. Relations with Spain were further strained by the Spanish government's closure of the Mississippi River, which hindered American transport and trade. Despite a strong alliance during the revolution, France paid little attention to the United States during the Confederacy period. The United States also made trade agreements with the Netherlands, Sweden, and Prussia in the 1780s, but these made up a relatively small portion of American trade compared to Great Britain. In the Mediterranean Sea, American ships faced the North African Barbary pirates. As Congress had few resources to address the issue, little was done during the Confederation period to take action against the pirates. A peace negotiation was made with Morocco, but Algiers, Tripoli, and Tunis continued to allow the capture of American ships.

=== Constitutional Convention ===
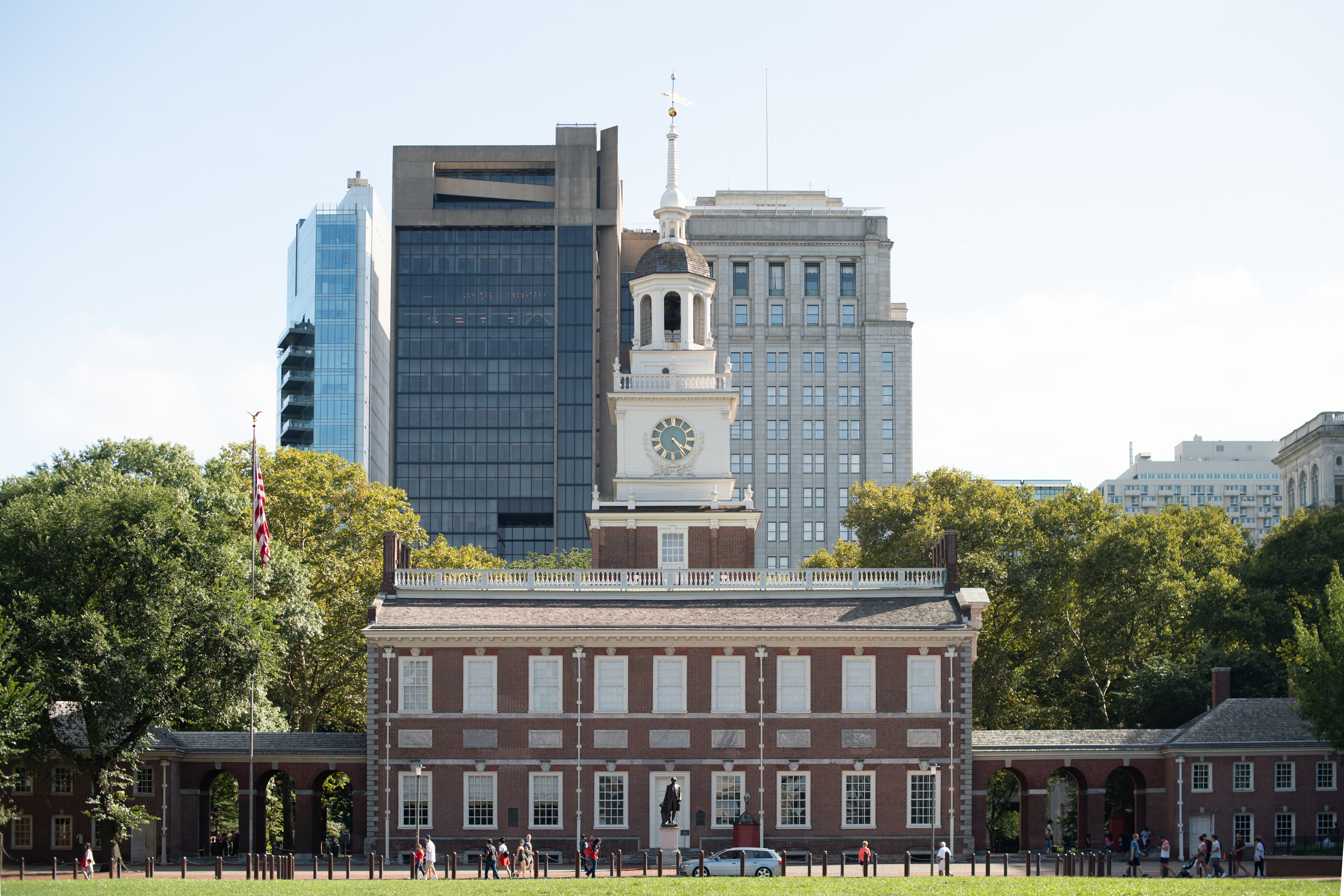
The Constitutional Convention was convened in the old Pennsylvania State House in Philadelphia, now known as Independence Hall.

Economic conflict grew between the states as the Confederation period went on, and Congress had no power to prevent it. By 1786, many of the most prominent Americans in government were expressing concerns that the government under the Articles of Confederation was not sufficient, as it lacked both the economic and military security that had previously been provided by Great Britain. The Annapolis Convention was held in 1786 to address trade issues, but it saw meager attendance with most states failing to send a delegate. The delegates from New Jersey had been authorized wide latitude by the state, and this was used to submit a proposal for a convention to reform the government entirely. In February 1787, Congress voted to hold the convention the following May, indicating a broad loss in confidence of the governmental system under the Articles of Confederation.

While there was not a clear objective before the convention, some delegates wished to establish a new central government that would have more power than Congress did under the Articles of Confederation. James Madison became the leader of these delegates, developing the Virginia Plan that would form the basis of the Constitution of the United States. The convention began on May 25, 1787, after a sufficient number of delegates had arrived in Philadelphia. The main issue at contention was the extent of power that would be transferred from the states to the federal government. Many state delegations, particularly that of Delaware, resisted centralization for fear that it would be dominated by the larger states. Madison's Virginia Plan competed with the New Jersey Plan of William Paterson, which opposed proportional representation in favor of equal representation. The dispute was resolved with the Connecticut Compromise, which created a bicameral legislature. The issue of slavery was also a concern, particularly in regard to whether slaves should be counted as citizens.

The final draft of the Constitution was delivered by Gouverneur Morris on September 12, 1787. Written to correct the weaknesses of the Articles of Confederation, the Constitution established the procedures and powers relating to Congress, the presidency, the courts, and how these offices related to the states. It also allowed for future amendments, acknowledged the debts incurred under the Articles of Confederation, and set the requirements for ratification. The delegates signed the Constitution on September 17 and sent it to Congress, where it was approved and sent to the states for ratification.

=== Campaign for ratification ===
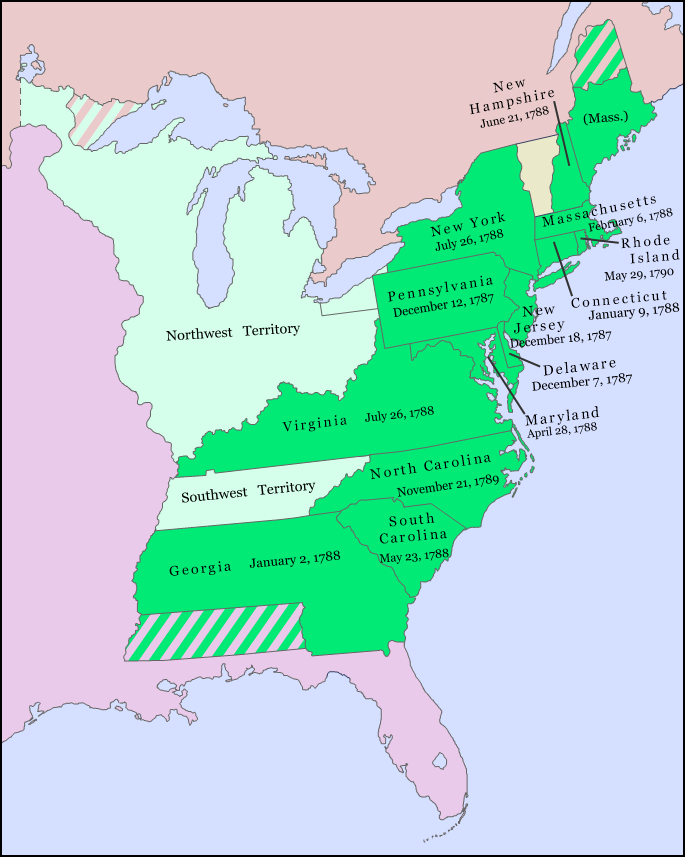
The dates each of the 13 initial states ratified the U.S. Constitution

Those who advocated the Constitution took the name Federalists and quickly gained supporters throughout the nation. The most influential Federalists were Alexander Hamilton and James Madison, the anonymous authors of The Federalist Papers, a series of 85 essays published in New York newspapers, written under the pen name "Publius" to sway the closely divided New York legislature. The papers have become seminal documents for the United States and have often been cited by jurists. Those who opposed the new Constitution became known as the Anti-Federalists. They were generally local rather than cosmopolitan in perspective, oriented to plantations and farms rather than commerce or finance, and wanted strong state governments and a weak national government.

Each state held a convention to vote on ratification of the Constitution. Supporters of ratification ensured that states more likely to accept the Constitution were the first to hold conventions, fearing that early rejections may dissuade other states from ratifying. Smaller states were supportive of the Constitution, as a centralized government offered a check on the power of larger states. Delaware and New Jersey ratified in 1787, and Georgia ratified on January 2, 1788, all by unanimous votes. Pennsylvania, Connecticut, Maryland, and South Carolina all ratified by large majorities over the winter and spring of 1788. It was more controversial in other states, with Massachusetts only ratifying by a narrow vote of 187–168. New Hampshire provided the final ratification that was necessary for the Constitution to go into effect on June 21, 1788. Ratification was more controversial in the larger states of New York, Virginia, and Massachusetts. Promises of a Bill of Rights from Madison secured ratification in Virginia, while in New York, the Clintons, who controlled New York politics, found themselves outmaneuvered as Hamilton secured ratification by a 30–27 vote. North Carolina and Rhode Island were the last of the 13 states to ratify, doing so after the new government had begun operation.

The United States Electoral College met on February 4, 1789, to unanimously vote for George Washington in the first presidential election. The 1st United States Congress read the results on April 6, and Washington was inaugurated at Federal Hall on April 30. A Bill of Rights was approved by the new Congress in September 1789 and took effect in December 1791.

== Westward expansion ==
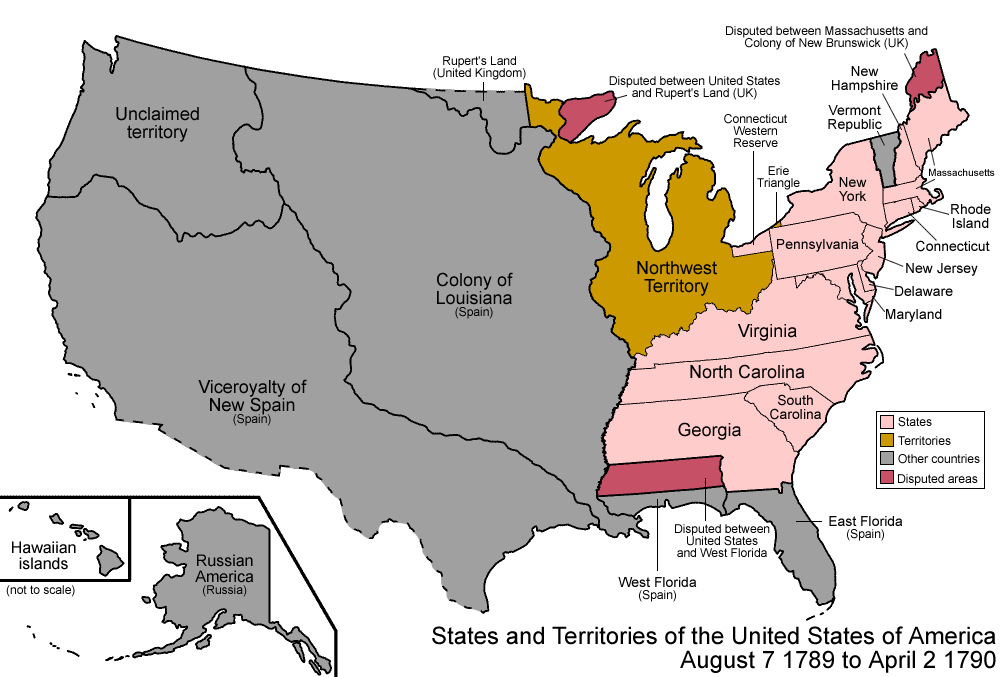
Map of the United States in 1789

Settlement of Trans-Appalachia grew during the Revolutionary War, increasing from a few thousand to 25,000 settlers. Westward expansion stirred enthusiasm even in those who did not move west, and many leading Americans, including Washington, Benjamin Franklin, and John Jay, purchased lands in the west. Land speculators founded groups like the Ohio Company, which acquired title to vast tracts of land in the west and often came into conflict with settlers.

From 1780 to 1784, Congress held negotiations with Virginia to cede its western territory. An agreement took effect on March 1, 1784, creating the first national territory that was not part of any state. Congress created a territorial government and set requirements for statehood with the Land Ordinance of 1784 and the Land Ordinance of 1785.

In 1787, Congress passed the Northwest Ordinance, which granted Congress greater control of the region by establishing the Northwest Territory. Under the new arrangement, many of the former elected officials of the territory were instead appointed by Congress. In order to attract Northern settlers, Congress outlawed slavery in the Northwest Territory, though it also passed a fugitive slave law to appease the Southern states. The Old Southwest remained under the control of the southern states, and each state claimed to extend west to the Mississippi River. In 1784, settlers in western North Carolina sought statehood as the State of Franklin, but their efforts were denied by Congress, which did not want to set a precedent regarding the secession of states.

During the Revolutionary War, Great Britain had aligned with many of the Native American tribes in its claimed territories to the west of the colonies. This was an escalation of the skirmishes that made up the American Indian Wars that had been prompted by land encroachment by colonists and raids by Native American tribes, such as the Shawnee tribes. Pioneers responded to Native American attacks against colonial civilians by in turn attacking Native American civilians. The British continued to supply arms to Native Americans after the signing of the Treaty of Paris. Between 1783 and 1787, hundreds of settlers died in low-level conflicts with Native Americans, and these conflicts discouraged further settlement. By the end of the decade, the frontier was engulfed in the Northwest Indian War against the Northwestern Confederacy. These Native Americans sought the creation of an independent Indian barrier state with the support and under protection of the British, posing a major foreign policy challenge to the United States. Though Great Britain had agreed to cede its western influence to the United States, it continued to provide weapons for the Northwestern Confederacy. As Congress provided little military support against the Native Americans, most of the fighting was done by the settlers. This war would continue until the signing of the Treaty of Greenville in 1795 that defined the boundary between the United States and the Native American tribes.

== Economy ==
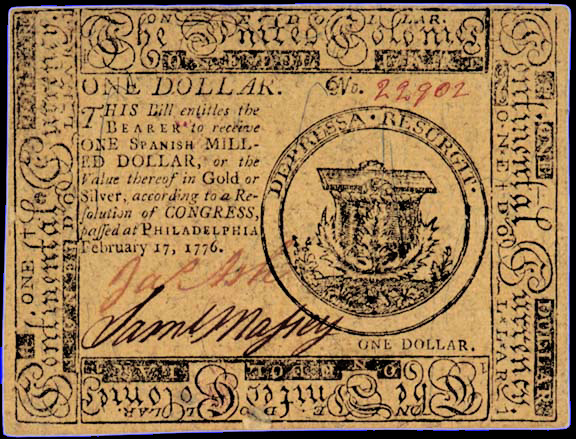
A one dollar continental banknote in 1776

The American Revolution had large scale effects on the economies of the Thirteen Colonies. The Continental Congress did not have the power to levy taxes, so it depended on the newly formed state governments to raise funds, and they were forced to raise taxes to cover war expenditures. It also caused a labor shortage as workers enlisted in the Patriot and Loyalist militaries, ending a decades-long trend of industrial expansion in the Mid-Atlantic. The workforce consisted of both free laborers and slave labor, while indentured servitude had largely fallen out of practice by the time of the American Revolution. Economic growth was further slowed by a reduction in immigration because of the war. The Bank of North America was established as the country's first bank in 1781.

The Continental Congress created its own Continental currency banknotes to increase funding, but this currency quickly depreciated in value and did not survive to the end of the war. The lack of a centralized currency and economic policy was a major factor in the decision to hold the Constitutional Convention. The war and the inflation caused shortages for both the military and for civilians. It was common during these shortages for civilians to form crowds and ransack stores that did not offer what they considered to be fair prices. Similar issues plagued the state governments as they accumulated their own debts, though the states could impose taxes and increased them significantly as the economic crisis worsened. Early supporters of revolution also supported corporatism and price controls, but most political and economic thinkers rejected these concepts, and support grew for a democratic free market system with taxation.

The economy of the early United States was heavily agricultural, but it also involved other forms of resource extraction, such as lumber, fishing, and fur. Manufacturing was limited, though shipbuilding was a major industry. The revolution required American merchants to rebuild connections with global markets, as trade had previously been facilitated under the flag of Great Britain. The high tariffs that were common at the time limited profitability, but high demand for American goods allowed the United States to make up for the economic turmoil of the revolution. When the war ended, the Treaty of Paris allowed British creditors to call in debts from the American market, triggering a depression. The government was also in debt to France, the Netherlands, and Spain. Many states raised taxes after the war to cover the expenses that it brought, prompting unrest, including that of Shays' Rebellion.

Due to the close relation of American and British commerce, many traders renegotiated with British merchants after the war, and they facilitated American trade as they did under colonial rule. Economic policies of individual states made domestic trade more difficult, as state governments often discriminated against merchants from other states. A national deficit occurred in 1786, and it continued to increase through the Confederation period. By 1787, Congress was unable to protect manufacturing and shipping. State legislatures were unable or unwilling to resist attacks upon private contracts and public credit. Land speculators expected no rise in values when the government could not defend its borders nor protect its frontier population.

== Culture and media ==
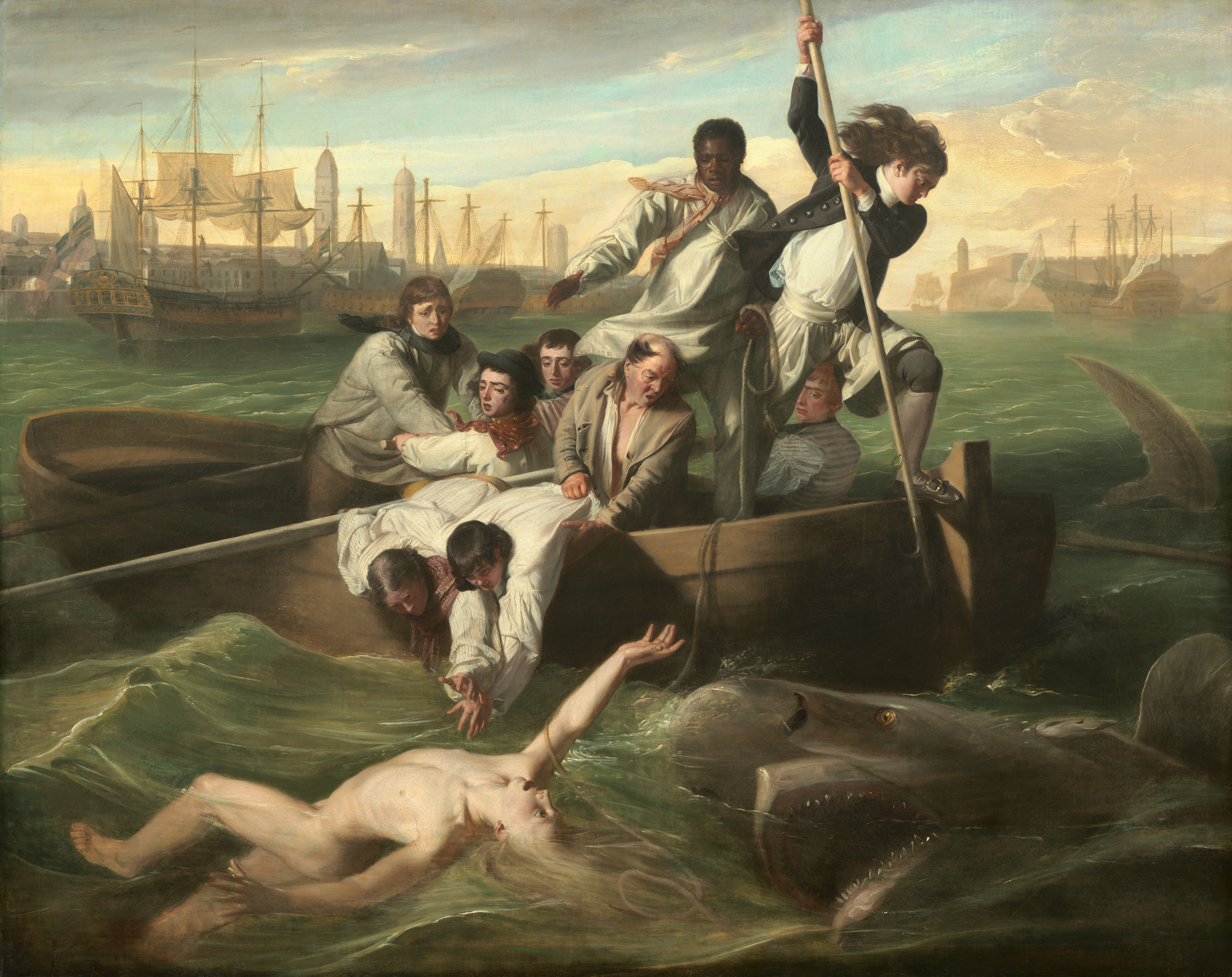
Watson and the Shark, a 1778 portrait by John Singleton Copley

A distinct American culture separate from Britain had already developed by the 1750s. A plainness in fashion and speech was common, originating from Puritan standards of the colonial era and reasserted by the revolution. The United States in the 18th century saw a proliferation of newspapers and magazine, many of which were in print only briefly. Political essays such as The American Crisis, Common Sense, and The Federalist Papers were influential in shaping the early United States. Full-length books also addressed political concepts regarding the revolution, including Letters from an American Farmer by J. Hector St. John de Crèvecœur and Notes on the State of Virginia by Thomas Jefferson. Social and political ideas were often expressed through poetry. Poets such as John Trumbull, Philip Freneau and Hugh Henry Brackenridge wrote of nationalist ideas about an independent United States. The Conquest of Canaan by Timothy Dwight is credited as the first epic poem of the United States. The Anarchiad was a prominent satire of the early United States. The first American novel, The Power of Sympathy, was published by William Hill Brown in 1789.

Drama and theater were controversial in the early United States. Plays had been condemned by Puritans in the colonial era, and the Continental Congress issued a formal condemnation of plays in 1774. Plays that were performed during the revolutionary era were typically European. The most prominent American dramatist during the revolutionary era was Mercy Otis Warren, whose plays included The Adulateur, The Group, and The Blockheads. Hugh Henry Brackenridge wrote two historical plays that portrayed the Revolutionary War. John Leacock wrote The Fall of British Tyranny, the first play to feature George Washington as a character. Innovations in drama declined after the Revolutionary War, in part due to the political and economic turmoil of the 1780s. William Dunlap began his prolific career as a playwright with The Father in 1789.

Visual art was influenced by the literature of European aestheticians, including Charles Alphonse du Fresnoy, Roger de Piles, Jonathan Richardson, and Johann Joachim Winckelmann. Many American artists traveled abroad to learn art, particularly to London to learn under Benjamin West. John Trumbull and Charles Willson Peale were prominent painters in the first years of the United States; as supporters of republicanism, they are both known for their respective portraits of George Washington.

== Science and education ==
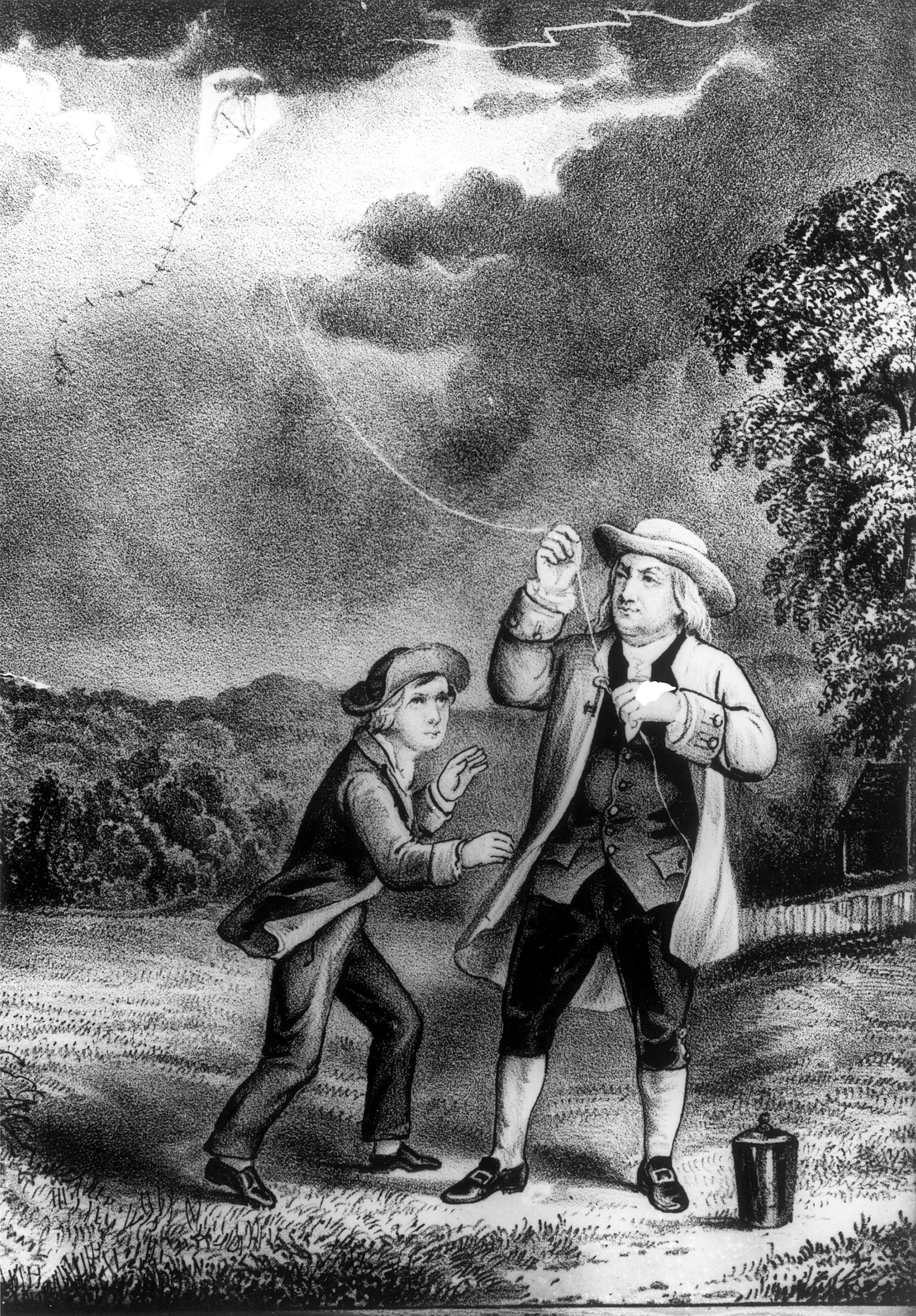
A depiction of Benjamin Franklin performing his kite experiment

Historians categorize the time of the American Revolution as part of a broader American Enlightenment, in which the ideas of the Age of Enlightenment began to influence American science and philosophy. This included a shift away from religious groundings in philosophy. Benjamin Franklin and Thomas Jefferson were prolific philosophic writers in this regard. Reason: the Only Oracle of Man by Ethan Allen was an early challenge to the religious rejection of rationalism in the United States in 1784. Massachusetts formed a medical society in 1781, following the precedent set by New Jersey in 1766.

The scientific community of the early United States was centered in Philadelphia, including the American Philosophical Society. Astronomy and taxonomy were two of the most prominent scientific fields at the time, and physicians of the revolutionary era often had a scientific background beyond medicine. Benjamin Franklin developed the study of electricity in the United States and discovered many of its properties. Many prominent scientists were immigrants from other countries, particularly Great Britain, which had a much larger scientific community.

The colonial colleges already existed by the time of the American Revolution. These colleges were all male, and they were based on the ideas of education associated with the Enlightenment. State universities began to form after the end of the Revolutionary War, starting with the University of Georgia in 1785. African Americans and Native Americans were only rarely admitted to universities, though African American men in northern states sometimes formed literary societies.

== Demographics ==
The population of the Thirteen Colonies was 2.5 million in 1776. The first national census was taken in 1790, shortly after the end of the Confederation period. It found that the United States had a population of 3,929,214 residents with an average of 4.5 people per square mile. There were five cities with a population over 10,000 residents. The largest city was New York City with 33,131 residents, followed by Philadelphia, Boston, Charleston, and Baltimore.

=== Patriots and loyalists ===
During the revolutionary period, residents of the states were divided on whether to seek independence or to remain loyal to the British Empire. Those who supported revolution came to be known as Whigs or Patriots, while those favoring loyalty to Great Britain were known as Tories or Loyalists. Loyalists were more common in the southern states. Though much of the population was opposed to or neutral toward revolution in the early years of independence, the proportion of Patriots increased as the conflict progressed. Supporters of the British Empire commonly included merchants and farmers that felt they benefited from colonial rule as well as slaves that hoped loyalty to Britain would bring them freedom. It proved controversial among Patriots when compensation to Loyalists became part of the peace agreement after the Revolutionary War.

Those who fought as members of the Continental Army benefited from the revolution, as they were predominantly working-class men who were able to meaningfully influence their government for the first time. Women of the revolution similarly desired increased influence in politics, but they were restricted from meaningful participation. Historians disagree on the extent that the revolution affected women that assisted the Patriots.

=== Religion ===
Many churches and ministers took vocal stances on the American Revolution while it was ongoing. John Adams considered the Anglican church to be a means for the Parliament of Great Britain to control the colonies. Anglican clergy associated with the Loyalists, and clergy that continued the mandated prayer for the Crown were harassed or exiled. Founding Father Benjamin Rush once said that some Loyalists opposed revolution because they feared it would give power to Presbyterians. From 1775 to 1783, the number of Anglican ministers in the Thirteen Colonies decreased from 311 to 141.

The Patriot reliance on Catholic France for military, financial, and diplomatic aid led to a sharp drop in anti-Catholic rhetoric. The Revolutionary War drew attention away from the Pope, making King George III the most prominent foreign opponent in the minds of Americans. Anti-Catholicism remained strong among Loyalists. By the 1780s, Catholics were extended legal toleration in all of the New England states in which they had previously been discriminated against.

=== Slavery ===
The controversial issue of slavery was brought up during the drafting of the Declaration of Independence; Jefferson's original draft condemned King George III for his support of the slave trade, but Southern delegates had the language removed. Virginia governor Lord Dunmore issued Dunmore's Proclamation in 1775, offering freedom to slaves that fought alongside the British. General Sir Henry Clinton made a similar proclamation in 1779. Thousands of slaves served as Black Loyalists in the Revolutionary War. Similarly, the Continental Army allowed Black men, including slaves, to serve in 1777. It also guaranteed freedom for slaves that joined the army, though Southern states worked to prevent such an offer.

The American Revolution made the issue of slavery more prominent, as some writers began to criticize what they saw as hypocrisy in supporting liberty while owning slaves, causing the institution to lose popularity in the Northern United States. Many slaves also pledged support to the Patriot cause, particularly in the north, further inclining these states to end slavery. In 1780, Pennsylvania enacted a law banning the enslavement of people born after March 1 of that year and guaranteeing freedom to children born into slavery after that date upon reaching the age of 28. Connecticut and Rhode Island ended slavery on similar terms in 1784. In other Northern states, slaves were active in both protest and litigation against slavery, and by the end of the 1780s, they successfully sued for freedom in all Northern states but New Jersey and New York.

Slaves in the Southern states, who made up a much larger proportion of the population, were not given significant liberties in light of the revolution. Changes to slavery in the South were smaller, including an end to the Atlantic slave trade in several states and the passage of laws that allowed slaveowners to free their slaves in their wills. Over the 1780s, the number of free Blacks in the South increased from roughly 4,000 to 60,000.

The issue of slavery was intensely debated during the drafting of the Constitution. Delegates at the Constitutional Convention were divided on the morality of slavery, and there was also debate about whether slaves should be counted when allocating proportional representation to each state. The dispute was resolved with the Three-fifths Compromise in which slaves would be counted as three-fifths of a person in the United States census.

== See also ==
- Timeline of the American Revolution
- Timeline of drafting and ratification of the United States Constitution
