= Badinage =

Badinage may refer to:

- Banter
- Wit or repartee
- Humorous or witty conversation
- Badinerie or scherzo (in classical music)
