= The Medical Repository =

- Discipline: Medicine
- Language: English

Publication details
- History: 1797-1824
- Frequency: Quarterly

Standard abbreviations
- ISO 4: Med. Repos.

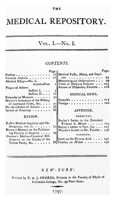
The first page of the first issue of The Medical Repository in 1797

The Medical Repository was the first American medical journal, founded in 1797 and published quarterly, with some interruptions, through 1824. It was printed by T. & J. Swords, printers to the physics faculty at Columbia College in New York City.

The journal's founding editors were Elihu Hubbard Smith, Samuel L. Mitchill, and Edward Miller. Smith edited the journal until his death in 1798, and Miller until his death in 1812, with Mitchill leaving his editorship after 1821; the final volumes were edited by James R. Manley and Charles Drake. The journal filled a vacuum in medical literature in the early United States, as most medical publications were European and difficult to obtain; the great demand for the journal is attested by the fact that its first two volumes were each reprinted twice, in 1800 and 1804.
