= David Humphreys (soldier) =

American diplomat (1752–1818)

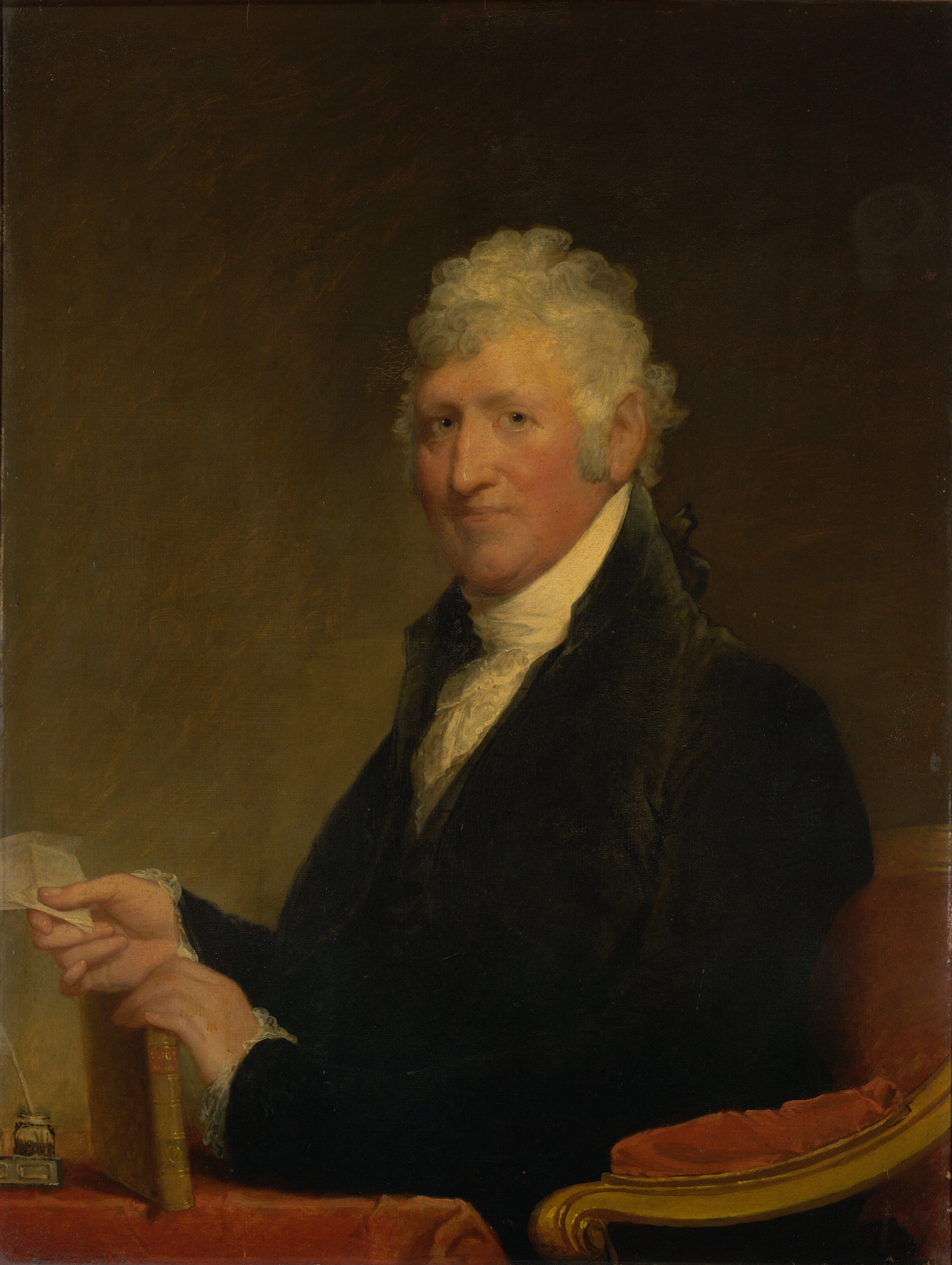
- Humphreys depicted in a portrait by Gilbert Stuart, c. 1808–1810

2nd United States Minister to Spain
- In office September 10, 1797 – December 28, 1801
- President: John Adams; Thomas Jefferson
- Preceded by: William Short
- Succeeded by: Charles Pinckney

1st United States Minister to Portugal
- In office May 13, 1791 – July 25, 1797
- President: George Washington; John Adams
- Preceded by: Position established
- Succeeded by: William Loughton Smith

Personal details
- Born: July 10, 1752 Derby, Connecticut Colony, British America
- Died: February 21, 1818 (aged 65) New Haven, Connecticut, U.S.
- Resting place: Grove Street Cemetery
- Spouse: Anne Frances Bulkeley
- Education: Yale University (BA, MA)
- Occupation: Diplomat, poet, entrepreneur

Military service
- Allegiance: United States
- Branch/service: (United States) Continental Army
- Years of service: 1776–1783
- Rank: Lieutenant Colonel
- Battles/wars: American Revolutionary War; Battle of Ridgefield; Battle of Sag Harbor; Yorktown campaign

David Humphreys (July 10, 1752 – February 21, 1818) was an American Revolutionary War lieutenant colonel and aide-de-camp to George Washington, a secretary and intelligence agent for Benjamin Franklin in Paris, American minister to Portugal and then to Spain, entrepreneur who brought Merino sheep to America, and member of the Connecticut state legislature. He was also a prolific poet and author and a member of the Hartford Wits. As secretary and speechwriter to George Washington during his administration, Humphreys was the nation's first U.S. presidential speechwriter.

== Early life and education ==
Humphreys was born in what was then Derby, Connecticut but is present-day Ansonia, Connecticut in a spacious two-story house at 37 Elm Street. The house of his birth, now called the David Humphreys House, is a historic museum in recognition of his birth there. Humphreys was the youngest of five children, including four sons and a daughter. His parents were Daniel and Sarah Riggs Bowers Humphreys. Humphreys' father Daniel served as parson of the town's Congregational church for 54 years from 1733, the year after he graduated from Yale, until 1787. Daniel Humphreys was the second husband of Sarah Riggs Bowers, known in Connecticut as "Lady Humphreys" in tribute to her "dignity and refinement of character," according to biographer Leo T. Molloy.

As a boy, Humphreys was passionately fond of books. His father prepared him and his brother, Daniel, to attend his own alma mater, Yale College, and both of them entered there. David was 15 years old when he entered the school and 19 when he graduated in 1771 with distinguished honors. While at Yale, he founded Brothers in Unity, a debating society that came to prominence in the 1800s. Among his college friends at Yale were Timothy Dwight IV, who later became one of Yale's great presidents; John Trumbull, a poet and lawyer and cousin of the painter of the same name; and Joel Barlow, a poet and diplomat.

After graduating from Yale, Humphreys became principal at the public school in Wethersfield, Connecticut for two years. He then worked as a tutor for the youngest of the 11 children of Col. Frederick Philipse at the Philipse Manor house in what is now Yonkers, New York.

Philipse Manor was a prominent and outspoken Tory academic institution, which only roused Humphreys' Patriot leanings. In 1774, Humphreys returned to New Haven and received a master of arts degree from Yale. He was offered a position as a Yale instructor, which he refused and instead taught part-time at a New Haven private school run by his brother, Daniel. Two of Humphreys' contemporaries, John Adams and Nathan Hale, also taught in the early part of their lives.

== American Revolutionary War ==
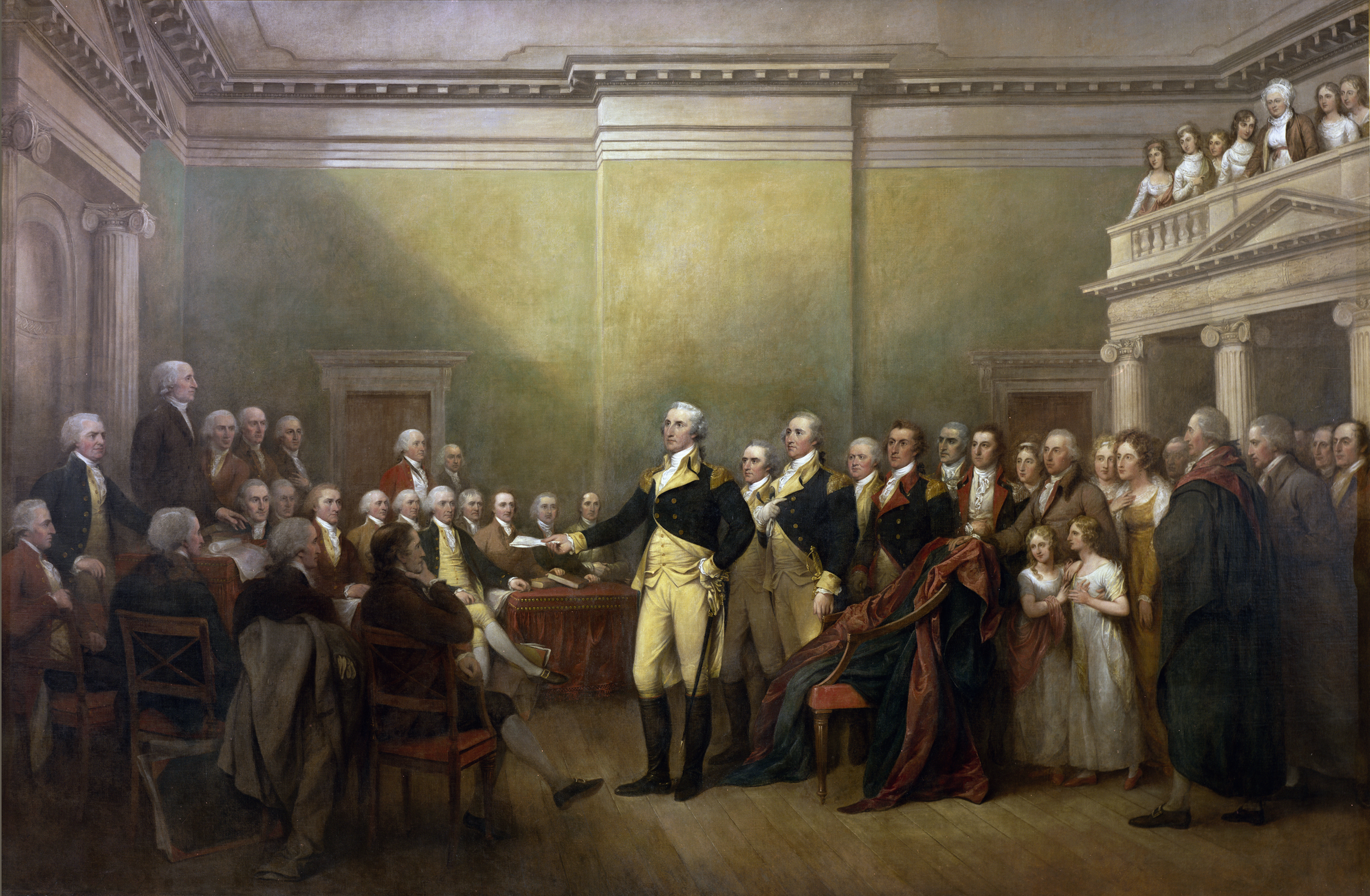
Humphreys standing immediately behind George Washington in General George Washington Resigning His Commission, an 1824 John Trumbull portrait now housed in the United States Capitol rotunda in Washington, D.C.

In July 1776, Humphreys enlisted in the Continental Army as a volunteer adjutant in the 2nd Connecticut Regiment and was stationed in New York state. The regiment consisted of several companies of men from Humphreys' hometown of Derby, Connecticut. He later was engaged in military action in the Battle of Ridgefield following the burning of Danbury, Connecticut and in a later raid on Sag Harbor, New York.

In the Sag Harbor raid, the Continental Army captured 90 prisoners, destroyed 12 enemy brigs and sloops, an armed vessel and an enormous quantity of stores, and returned to Connecticut without the loss of a single soldier. Humphreys traveled to New Jersey to meet directly with General George Washington to brief Washington on the battle's success. Their meeting in New Jersey was probably the first between the two.

Humphreys was promoted to captain and major and served on the staffs of Continental Army Generals Parsons, Israel Putnam, and Nathanael Greene. On June 23, 1780, Humphreys was appointed aide-de-camp at Washington's headquarters staff, and he became a confidential friend and adviser to the general.

After the Battle of Yorktown, Washington entrusted the surrendered British colors, along with the general's report on the battle, to Humphreys and Tench Tilghman, a fellow aide who also delivered word of the Patriot victory to Congress. A painting of Humphreys arriving with them, The Delivery of the Standards to the Continental Congress in Philadelphia, November, 1781, is now displayed at the New Haven Museum and Historical Society, which also has a ceremonial sword that Congress voted be presented to Humphreys. The sword was presented in 1786 by Gen. Henry Knox. Humphreys was commissioned a lieutenant colonel with his commission backdated to his appointment as an aide to Washington.

When Washington resigned his commission and presented himself before Congress, Humphreys was one of two aides who accompanied him into the chamber; the other was Benjamin Walker. Humphreys then traveled with Washington and his wife Martha back to Mount Vernon. Washington later recommended to Congress that it appoint Humphreys secretary of foreign affairs, but Congress appointed John Jay instead.

After the Revolutionary War, Humphreys became an original member of Connecticut's Society of the Cincinnati.

== Public service ==
Humphreys was appointed to a commission to negotiate treaties of commerce with European nations. Other members of the commission included John Adams, Thomas Jefferson, and Benjamin Franklin. Humphreys became Franklin's secretary in 1784 in Paris, where he also served as a U.S. intelligence agent, and continued as a secretary to the legation under Thomas Jefferson.

In a letter of introduction to Franklin, Washington described Humphreys, writing: "This gentleman was several years in my family as aide-de-camp -- his zeal in the cause of his country -- his good sense, prudence and attachment to me, rendered him dear to me; and I persuade myself you will find no confidence which you may think proper to repose in him, misplaced. He possesses an excellent heart, good natural and acquired abilities and -- sterling integrity -- to which may be added sobriety and an obliging disposition."

In 1786, Humphreys was elected to the October session of the Connecticut General Assembly. He was appointed head of Connecticut's state militia and marched to West Springfield, Massachusetts to help deal with the civil strife and tumult of Shays' Rebellion, but by the time he had arrived, Massachusetts authorities had already subdued it.

Humphreys' mother died on July 27, 1787, and his father died a few weeks later, on September 2. At Washington's invitation, Humphreys stayed at Mount Vernon during the 1780s, acting as the general's private secretary and managing his correspondence. When Washington took the oath of office in New York City after being elected the nation's first president in 1789, Humphreys accompanied him on the trip from Mount Vernon and stood beside him during the ceremony. Humphreys served as Washington's speechwriter and helped add flourish to his speeches and correspondences before and during his presidency.

In 1791, Humphreys had the distinction of being the first minister appointed to a foreign country under the Constitution when he was appointed minister to Portugal. In that post, Humphreys negotiated the ransomed release of American prisoners from the Dey of Tripoli, Libya.

In 1797, he was appointed as minister to Spain, which then controlled the Mississippi River and all of Latin America except Brazil. William Loughton Smith succeeded him as U.S. minister in Lisbon. He remained minister to Spain until 1801, and during his stay there met and married Anne Frances Bulkeley, a cultured and wealthy English woman, whose father, John Bulkeley, was a banker, merchant, and trader. In 1804, Humphreys was elected as a member to the American Philosophical Society in Philadelphia.

He served again as a member of the Connecticut House of Representatives from 1812 to 1814, and was elected a Fellow of the Royal Society of London in June 1807. In 1813, Humphreys was also elected a member of the American Antiquarian Society.

== Entrepreneur ==
The couple moved to Boston, where they bought a home on Chestnut Street on Beacon Hill and "entertained lavishly." But Humphreys bought a farm in Derby, Connecticut, and the couple also managed to spend considerable time there. He also bought a factory and house, now known as the Sanford-Humphreys House in what is present-day Seymour, Connecticut that produced scythes and other iron tools. For a time, the community was called "Humphreysville."

Having seen poor conditions in mills in England, he was determined to avoid a similar situation in his plant in Seymour. He took many of his employees to New York City for training, educating, and clothing. Humphreys established evening and Sunday schools for his employees and organized them into a uniformed military company, which he drilled personally.

"It was largely through his efforts that the state inaugurated its efforts at factory inspection," according to biographer Leo Molloy. As a farmer, Humphreys was actively interested in agricultural improvements, and his farm became an experimental station. He helped found the Agriculture Society of Connecticut and became its first president.

== Merino sheep ==
In 1802, Humphreys bought a herd of merino sheep in Spain and had them imported directly to Derby. Out of 25 rams and 75 ewes, five rams and two ewes died in the passage. They attracted a good deal of attention in town. "Humphreys considered their fleece of a superior quality and believed that their mixture with American sheep would eventually result in the production, through manufacture, of finer fabrics in America," his biographer wrote.

He sold some of the sheep, which then were resold in a flurry of speculation. He set up the first successful woolen mill factory in the U.S., and it quickly achieved the reputation as the best producer of broadcloth in the nation. Coats made from the "golden fleece" were worn by President Thomas Jefferson, James Madison, and Captain Isaac Hull. Humphreys is regarded as the founder of the woolen industry in the U.S.

== Poet and author ==
Humphreys composed the first American sonnet in 1776, titled "Addressed to my Friends at Yale College, on my Leaving them to join the Army", and his most popular work, Happiness of America, written in 1785, was published in ten editions between 1786 and 1804.

Humphreys enjoyed writing and had a voluminous correspondence with Washington, now housed in the Library of Congress in Washington, D.C. He also wrote for the public and was the author of a "Life of General Israel Putnam," whose staff he served on. He was one of the writers in the Hartford Wits; other members included Joel Barlow, Timothy Dwight IV, John Trumbull, and Lemuel Hopkins. He co-authored The Anarchiad, a satirical poem that reflected Humphreys' Federalist Party bent. In 1802, he wrote an anti-slavery poem, "A Poem on the Industry of the United States of America". He was elected a Fellow of the American Academy of Arts and Sciences in 1804.

In 1786, Humphreys wrote an account of the confinement and proposed execution of British Captain Charles Asgill for the New-Haven Gazette. The article, now included in Washington's official papers on the affair, was published posthumously in 1859 as a book, The conduct of General Washington : respecting the confinement of Capt. Asgill, placed in its true point of light.

Humphreys' play The Yankey in England (c. 1814) was influential in forging the stage character of the Yankee, often singing "Yankee Doodle", that came to dominate American and English comedies in the period up to 1850, and comes with a seven-page glossary of the peculiar idiom and pronunciation of Americanisms, which is an important source for American historical dialectology.

== Death and legacy ==
Humphreys died in his room at Butler's Tavern in New Haven, Connecticut, where he stayed when he was attending to affairs in Derby, and was interred at Grove Street Cemetery in New Haven.

Humphreys appears in John Trumbull's 1824 painting General George Washington Resigning His Commission, which was featured on the reverse of the United States five-thousand-dollar bill.

== See also ==
- David Humphreys House
- List of the oldest buildings in Connecticut

== Gallery ==
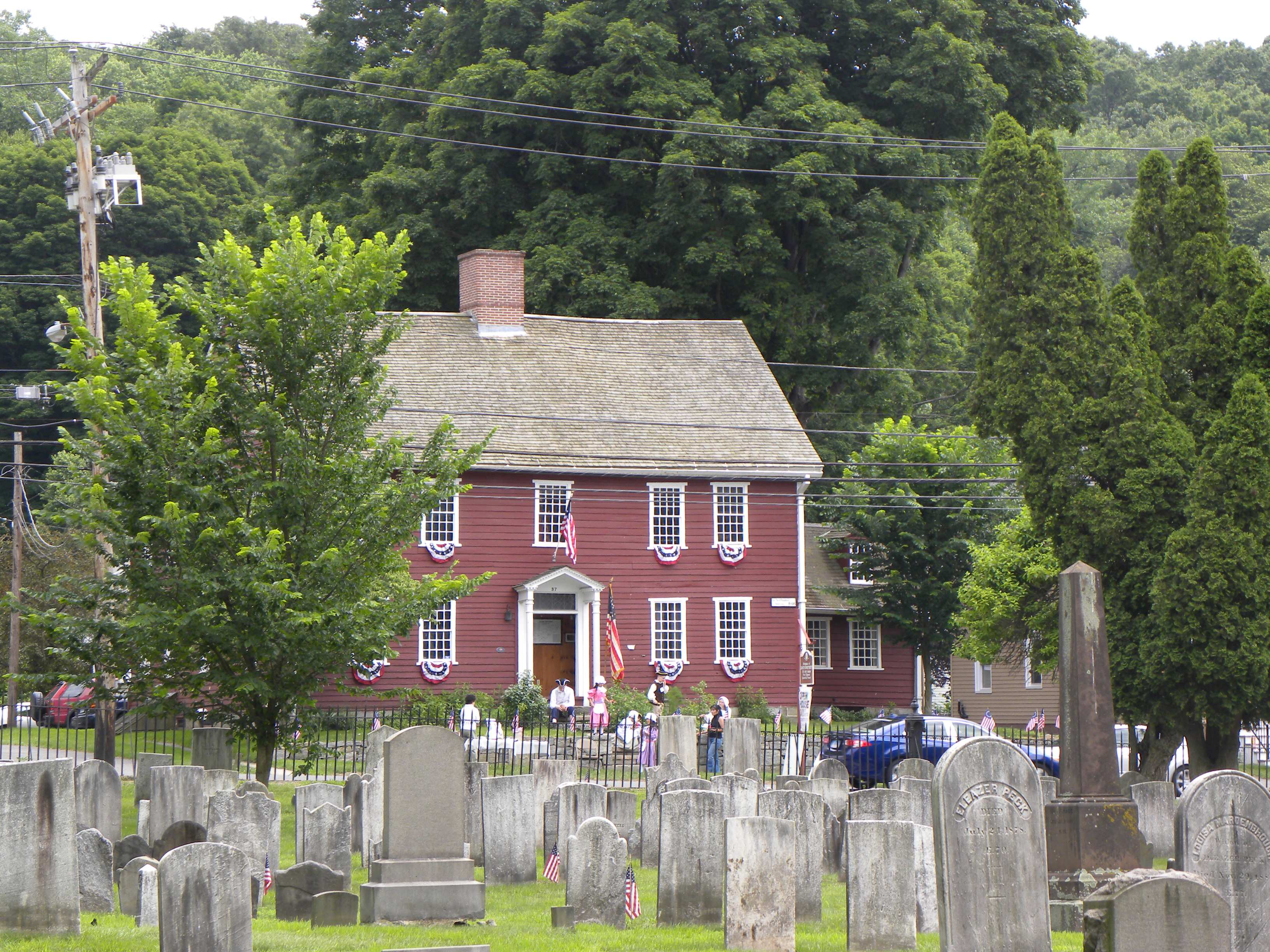
The David Humphreys home, built in 1698, is now maintained by the Derby Historical Society. It is located at 37 Elm Street, Ansonia, CT.

Engraving of David Humphreys

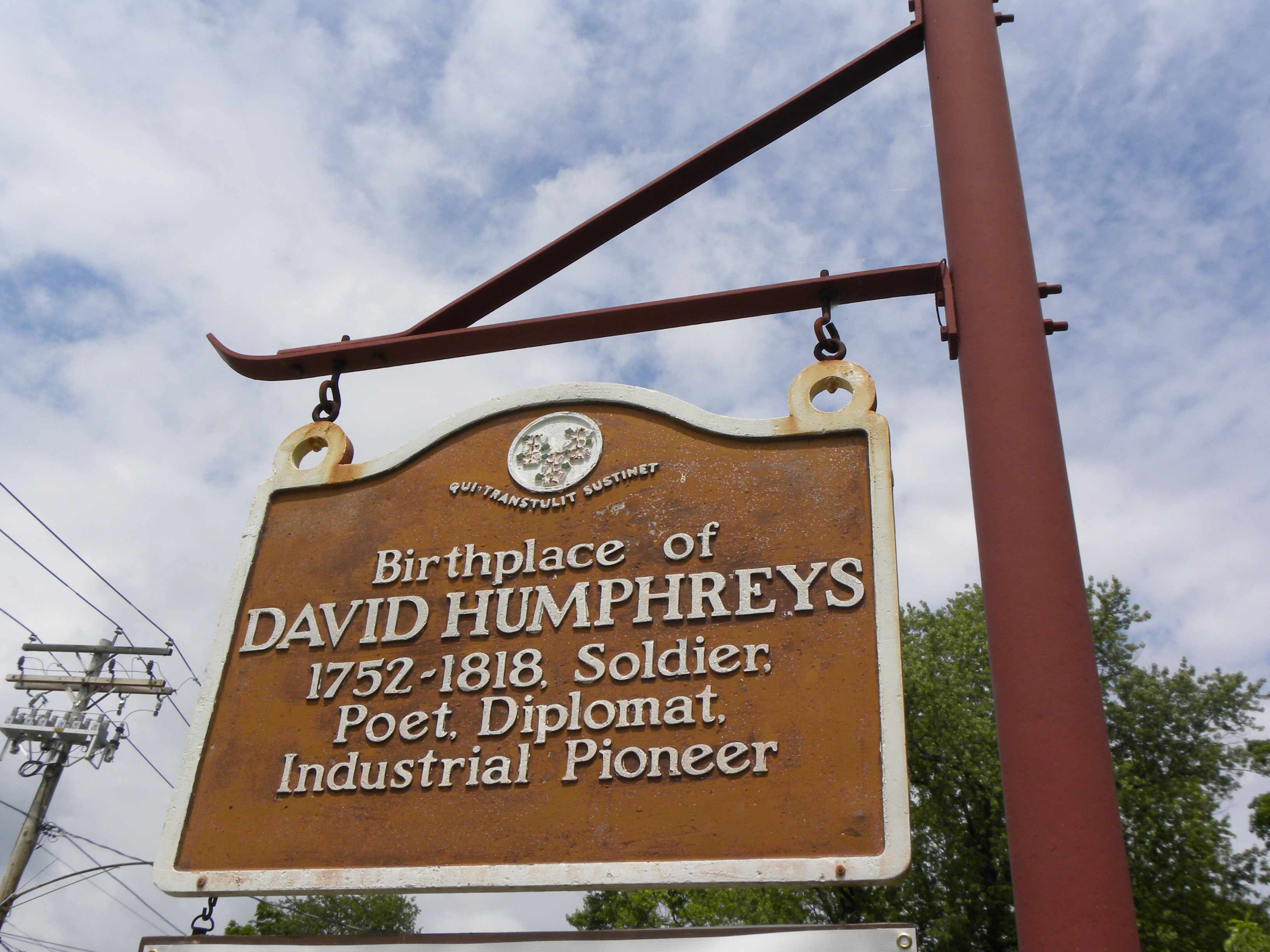
Signpost for the David Humphreys home at 37 Elm St., Ansonia, CT.

Humphreys' monument, Grove Street Cemetery

Diplomatic posts
Preceded by William Short	U.S. Minister to Spain; 1797–1801	Succeeded by Charles Pinckney
