= Elihu Hubbard Smith =

American playwright, poet, physician, and man of letters

- Born: September 4, 1771; Litchfield, Connecticut, British America
- Died: September 19, 1798 (aged 27); Manhattan, New York, U.S.
- Education: Yale College (BA); Medical College of Philadelphia
- Occupations: Playwright, poet, physician, man of letters
- Writing career
- Language: English
- Years active: 1791–1798
- Movement: Connecticut Wits

Elihu Hubbard Smith (September 4, 1771 – September 19, 1798) was an American author, physician, and man of letters.

== Early life and education ==
Smith was born in Litchfield, Connecticut, to Dr. Reuben Smith and Abigail Hubbard Smith. He entered Yale College at the age of 11 and received his Bachelor of Arts degree in 1786, making him Yale's youngest graduate at the time. He studied another year with Timothy Dwight at the academy at Greenfield Hill in Fairfield and went on to attend lectures at the Medical College of Philadelphia in 1790. He never received a medical degree but returned to Connecticut in late 1791 and attempted to establish a medical practice in Wethersfield, Connecticut, but had little success.

Smith became a practicing physician in New York City in 1793, joined New York Hospital, which is present-day Weill Cornell Medical Center, in 1796, and published articles on plagues and pestilential fevers in Syracuse, New York and in ancient Athens.

== Literary career ==
Smith wrote the first American comic opera, Edwin and Angelina; or, The Banditti (1796), a musical dramatization of Oliver Goldsmith's romantic ballad “The Hermit.” He was editor of the first book-length anthology of American poetry (American Poems, Selected and Original, 1793) and the first national American medical journal (The Medical Repository, launched in 1796–97). Smith was the youngest member of the Connecticut Wits, and alongside Richard Alsop, Mason Cogswell, Theodore Dwight, and Lemuel Hopkins, he contributed to The Echo, a series of satiric poems with a Federalist slant. From 1795 until his death, he kept a diary totaling some half-million words.

In New York City, Smith was a member and trustee of the anti-slavery Manumission Society, which ran a school for the children of slaves. His home became the headquarters of the Friendly Club, a New York literary society of young Federalist intellectuals. He was a friend and correspondent of many leading intellectuals of the era, including Noah Webster, Alexander Hamilton, Benjamin Rush, Uriah Tracy, Samuel Latham Mitchill, Charles Brockden Brown, James Kent, and William Dunlap. Smith was a deist.

== Death ==
Smith contracted yellow fever while attending patients during an outbreak of the disease in New York. He died five days later at the home of his friend Horace Johnson, brother of friend/housemate William Johnson, on September 19, 1798. He is buried in the cemetery of the First Presbyterian Church on Wall Street in Manhattan.

Smith's portrait, painted by James Sharples ca. 1797, is in the permanent collection of the New-York Historical Society.
