= David Humphreys House =

Historic house in Connecticut, United States

- Gen. David Humphreys House
- U.S. National Register of Historic Places
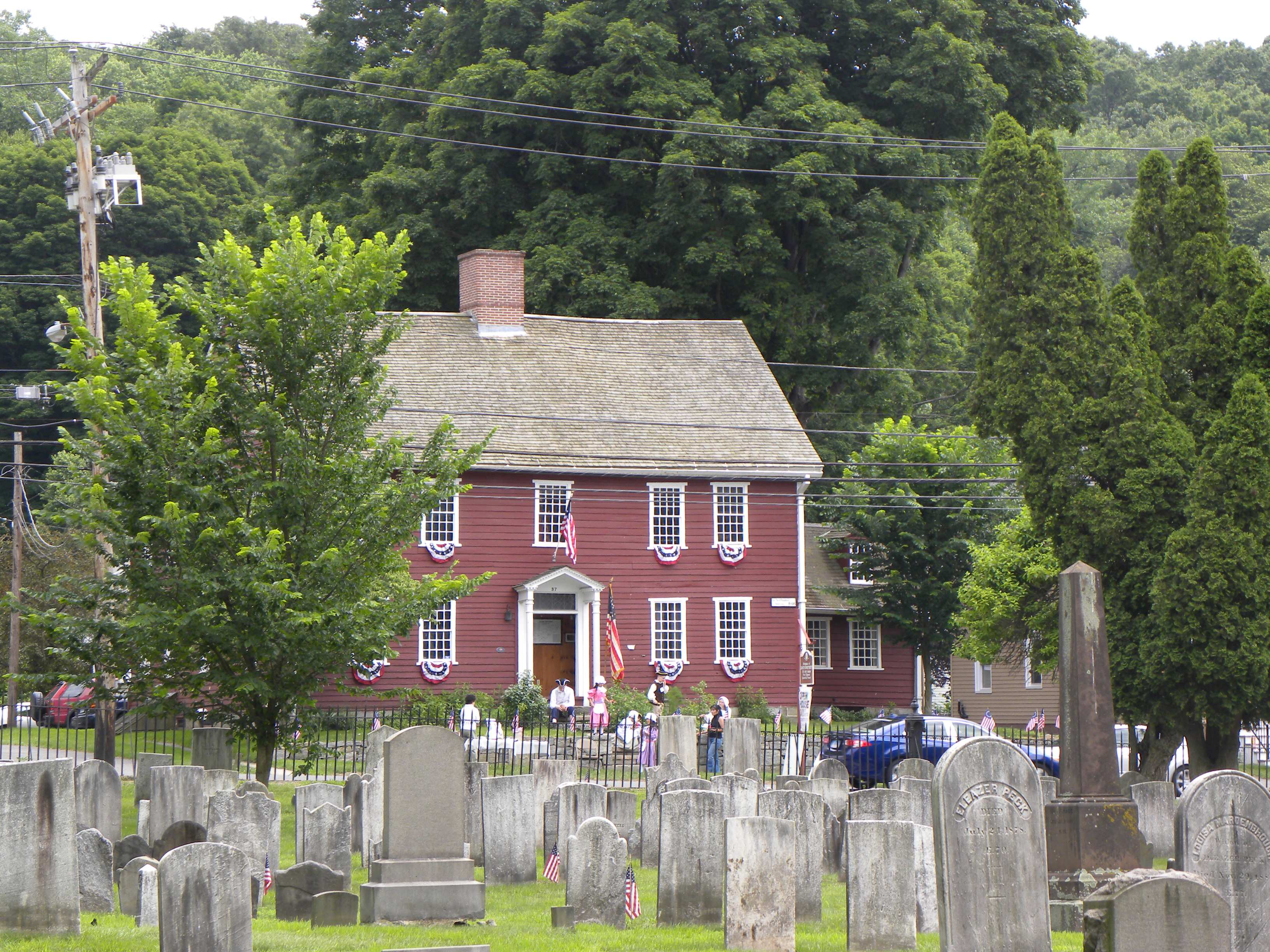

- Location within Connecticut Location within the United States
- Location: 37 Elm Street, Ansonia, Connecticut, U.S.A
- Coordinates: 41°19′52″N 73°4′30″W
- Area: less than one acre
- Built: 1695-1698
- Architectural style: Colonial
- NRHP reference No.: 72001321
- Added to NRHP: March 17, 1972

The General David Humphreys House is a historic house museum at 37 Elm Street CT 243 in Ansonia, Connecticut. Built in the 1690s, it was the birthplace of the American Revolutionary War Colonel David Humphreys. It is now owned by the Derby Historical Society and serves as its headquarters. The house was listed on the National Register of Historic Places in 1972.

== Description and history ==
The Humphreys House is located in Southern Ansonia, on the East Side of Elm Street CT 243 North of Vose Street. It is a 2 1/2-story wood-frame structure, with a gabled roof, central chimney, and clapboarded exterior. Its main facade is five bays wide, with sash windows arranged symmetrically around a center entrance. The entrance is slightly recessed, with a shallow projection gabled portico. The interior retains many original early features, include a large fireplace in the rear chamber, and hand-carved wall paneling. The house underwent major restorative work in the late 20th century.

David Humphreys was born in this house in 1752, when the area was still part of Derby. Humphreys was a friend of and aide de camp to General George Washington and was nominated by President Washington to become the first ambassador of the United States to a foreign country (Portugal). He was also responsible for introducing merino sheep to Connecticut, brought over when he United States Ambassador to Spain. The historic house museum has been restored to a mid-18th-century appearance, and serves as the headquarters for the Derby Historical Society.

== See also ==
- List of the oldest buildings in Connecticut
- National Register of Historic Places listings in New Haven County, Connecticut
