= Sanford-Humphreys House =

- U.S. National Register of Historic Places
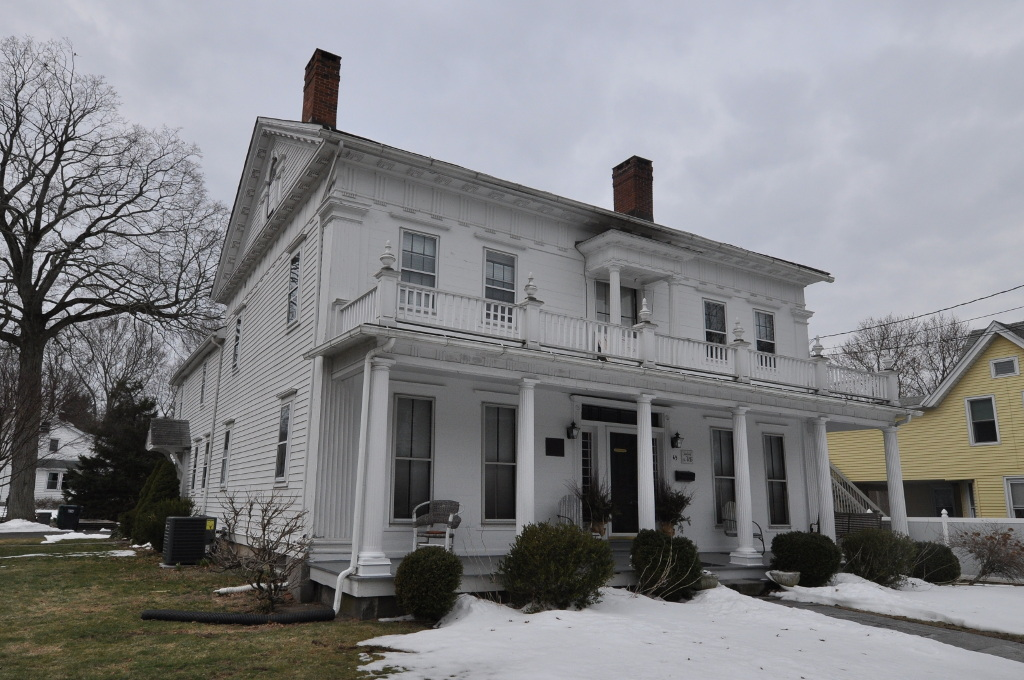

- Location within Connecticut Location within the United States
- Location: 61-63 West Street, Seymour, Connecticut
- Coordinates: 41°23′39″N 73°04′47″W
- Area: less than one acre
- Built: 1790
- Architectural style: Georgian; Greek Revival
- NRHP reference No.: 82004357
- Added to NRHP: May 11, 1982

The Sanford-Humphreys House is a historic house at 61-63 West Street in Seymour, Connecticut. The house has a construction history dating to the 1790s, and is associated with two prominent figures in Seymour's history: Samuel Sanford, the area's first doctor, and General David Humphreys, a soldier, diplomat, and businessman who developed the first textile mills in the area. The house was listed on the National Register of Historic Places in 1982.

== Description and history ==
The Sanford-Humphreys House stands in a residential area west of the Naugatuck River at the northwest corner of West and Church Streets. It is a 2 1/2-story wood-frame structure, with a gabled roof and clapboarded exterior. Its main facade is five bays wide, with a single-story porch extending across its full width, supported by round Doric columns and topped by a low balustrade with urn-topped columns. Ground floor windows are tall, reaching nearly to the floor in the Greek Revival style, and the center entrance is framed by sidelight and transom windows. Fluted pilasters rise at the corners to a decorative entablature and cornice. The building's construction shows evidence of multiple phases of work.

The first documented owner of the property is Doctor Samuel Sanford, who moved here in 1790, when the area was part of Derby, and served as the first physician to the local population. He is credited with the construction of part of the rear ell of the building, which exhibits 18th-century construction methods. The main block of the house was built for General David Humphreys, who purchased the house from Sanford's estate in 1803. The Greek Revival styling appears to have been a later addition, although sources disagree on who the owner was. Humphreys apparently did not live here, perhaps using it as a base for his industrial interests. In 1803 he also purchased the local dam, and soon afterward built one of the nation's first woolen mills. At the time of Humphreys' death in 1818, the house was occupied by his nephew John, who was overseeing the mill (Humphreys had no children, and his nephew inherited the works and the house).

== See also ==
- National Register of Historic Places listings in New Haven County, Connecticut
