= The Columbiad =

Epic poem by Joel Barlow

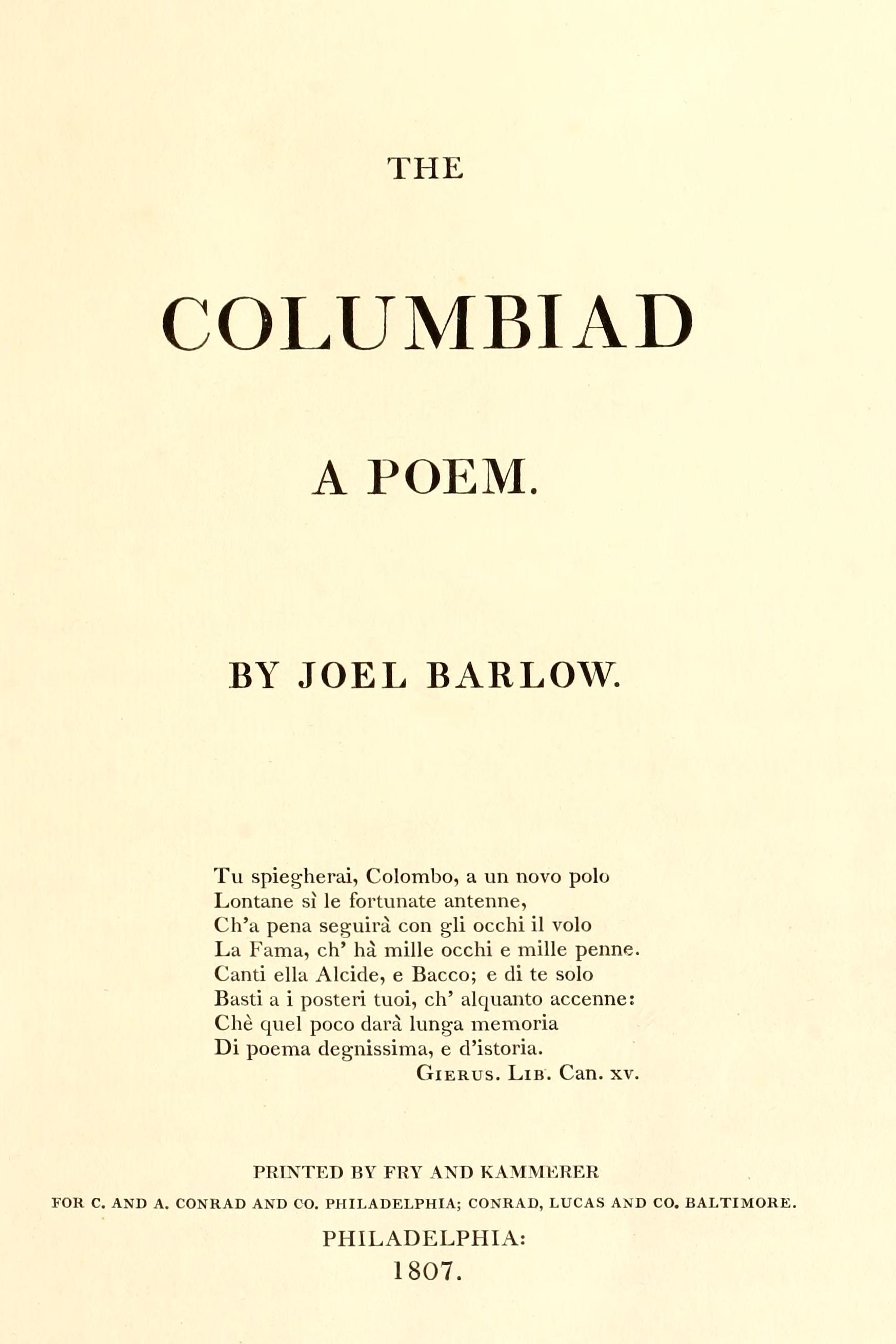
First edition title page, 1807

The Columbiad (1807) is a philosophical epic poem by the American diplomat and man of letters Joel Barlow. It grew out of Barlow's earlier poem The Vision of Columbus (1787). Intended as a national epic for the United States, it was popular with the reading public and compared with Homer, Virgil and Milton.

== The Vision of Columbus ==
The Columbiad had its origins in The Vision of Columbus, a philosophical poem begun in 1780 and continued through Barlow's service as a military chaplain in the American Revolutionary War. A hymn of praise to America written in nine books, The Vision of Columbus took the form of a dialogue between Christopher Columbus and an angel. Its panoramic range includes the whole history of both North and South America, and culminates in the Revolutionary War and the glorious post-Revolutionary future of the United States. In tone the poem is overtly Christian, and is coloured by Barlow's political sympathies, which were then Federalist. It was published in 1787 by subscription, the subscribers including George Washington, Benjamin Franklin, and Louis XVI of France. The Vision of Columbus enjoyed an enormous success with the American reading public, establishing him as the leading poet of his country, and it attracted admiration in France and England.

== Rewriting ==
Over the next 20 years Barlow laboriously reworked The Vision, eventually expanding it from 4700 lines to 8350, building up a huge apparatus of prefaces and footnotes, and so altering the whole tenor of the work that it bore little resemblance to the original. Barlow's religious convictions turned to scepticism, while in politics he became a liberal democrat, and these changes were reflected in the poem. His hopes for the future of America were pinned on a new trinity of "equality, free election, and federal band", which would bring about a new age of artistic and scientific advance. The Columbiad shows human history reaching its climax in the formation of a world council in Egypt, the delegates to which have thrown aside the symbols of their religious faith. Barlow wrote that the object of his poem was "to inculcate the love of rational liberty, and to discountenance the deleterious passion for violence and war".

== Publication ==
The Columbiad was published in 1807 by the firm of C. and A. Conrad, in the form of a sumptuously printed, lavishly illustrated édition de luxe of unprecedented magnificence. This has been described as "the graphic arts event of the decade", and more than 20 years later it could still be claimed that it had been produced "in a style of elegance which few works, either American or European, have ever equalled". Since copies of the first edition were sold at the prohibitive price of $20 it was necessary to bring out a cheaper duodecimo edition in 1809. Altogether there were seven printings between 1807 and 1825, five in America and two abroad. Thereafter it remained out of print until in 1970 both The Vision of Columbus and The Columbiad were reprinted in Bottorff and Ford's edition of The Works of Joel Barlow in Two Volumes.

== Reception ==
Sales of the cheap second edition of The Columbiad were encouraging, and the newspaper publicity given to the poem was greater than that generated by many successful novels, but reviews were from the first mixed. James Dennie's Port Folio, a Federalist paper which could hardly be expected to support a renegade from that party, pronounced The Columbiad "as a whole...devoid of interest", though Dennie later admitted the article had been an "obnoxious criticism". Others praised it to the skies, comparing it favourably with Homer, Virgil and Milton, but Francis Jeffrey in the Edinburgh Review found the plot incoherent and the style cumbrous and inflated. British critics also objected to Barlow's taste for coining neologisms, such as crass and utilize. In France the revolutionary leader and former bishop Henri Grégoire published a vitriolic open letter taking grave exception to Barlow's secularist point of view, and this was extensively reprinted in the United States. Barlow responded with a pamphlet, Letter to Henri Grégoire...in Reply to his Letter on the Columbiad, which was likewise reprinted in many American newspapers, keeping the poem in the public eye. Partly as a result of this controversy sales of The Columbiad continued healthy, but by the 1820s interest in the poem was waning, either because it was too concerned with the issues of its own day, because the evangelized American public at the time of the Second Great Awakening were not ready to take such a freethinking work to its heart, or because Barlow's Augustan conception of epic poetry seemed hopelessly old-fashioned in a Romantic age. In 1829 it was being reported that The Columbiad "is now fallen quite into neglect", and in 1900 Barrett Wendell said that "few mortals now living have more than glanced at [it]".

The Columbiad’s standing has not greatly improved in modern times. It has been called "one of the strangest pieces of literature produced by a 19th-century American", "more like a political treatise than a poem", and simply "unreadable". The word turgid is regularly used to describe it, and the scholar Russel Blaine Nye went so far as to say that The Columbiad was "one of the most complete failures in American poetic history". But a few critics have found mitigating virtues. In 1917 the Cambridge History of American Literature conceded that "hidden away among these thousands of lines of laboured rhetoric, are passages really fine and free in both conception and execution"; the historian Vernon Louis Parrington wrote that while "it may not be good poetry...the sentiments are those of an enlightened and generous man"; and the academic Steven Blakemore, while acknowledging in a full-length study the many obstacles the poem presents to the modern reader, believes it to be "one of the most significant intertextual nineteenth-century poems in American literature".
