= New Oxford Wits =

The term New Oxford Wits was applied, around 1980, to a group of young English writers who had been at the University of Oxford in the 1970s. It alludes to the Oxford Wits of the 1920s. Those supposed to be in the New Oxford Wits were Martin Amis, Julian Barnes, Tina Brown, James Fenton, Ian Hamilton and Craig Raine.
