= Oxford Wits =

The Oxford Wits, a term coined later, were an identifiable group of literary and intellectual aesthetes and dandies, present as undergraduates at the University of Oxford in England in the first half of the 1920s.

Their leader in fashion was Harold Acton, but their later leader in intellectual matters was more noticeably Maurice Bowra. Their attitudes were those portrayed and parodied in the nostalgic Brideshead Revisited of Evelyn Waugh, the most important literary figure to emerge from the group.

Others who are cited as Oxford Wits are John Betjeman, Robert Byron, Cyril Connolly, Brian Howard, Alan Pryce-Jones, John Sparrow, John Sutro, and Christopher Sykes.

== See also ==
- New Oxford Wits
