= McFingal =

1775 mock epic poem by poet John Trumbull

- A Modern Epic Poem. Or, The Town-Meeting
- by John Trumbull
- Country: United States
- Language: English
- Genre(s): Mock-heroic, satire
- Publisher: William and Thomas Bradford
- Publication date: 1775
- Media type: Print
- OCLC: 690377493

McFingal: a modern epic poem. Or, The town-meeting is a mock epic poem written by American poet John Trumbull.

This canto, about 1500 lines, contains some verses from Thomas Gage's Proclamation and was published in the Connecticut Courant on 7 and 14 August 1775; it portrays a Scottish Loyalist, McFingal, and his Whig opponent, Honorius, evidently a portrait of John Adams. This first canto was divided into two, and with a third and a fourth canto published in 1782.

== 1st edition ==
- Philadelphia: Printed and sold by William and Thomas Bradford, at the London coffee-house. 1775.
