= The Anarchiad =

American satiric poem

- by David Humphreys, John Trumbull, Joel Barlow, Lemuel Hopkins
- Cover of 1861 reprint
- First published in: New Haven Gazette; Connecticut Magazine
- Country: United States
- Language: English
- Subject: Politics
- Genre: Mock-epic
- Publication date: 1786–87

The Anarchiad, or American Antiquities: A Poem on the Restoration of Chaos and Substantial Night (1786–87) is an American mock-epic poem written by four members of the Hartford Wits: David Humphreys, John Trumbull, Joel Barlow, and Lemuel Hopkins. The work reflected Federalist concerns during the formation of the United States.

== About ==
The Anarchiad was serialized in twelve parts from October 26, 1786, to September 13, 1787, in The New Haven Gazette and Connecticut Magazine.

The poem drew inspiration from Alexander Pope's satiric epics such as The Dunciad which used a pseudo-classical setting as a vehicle for satire, and James MacPherson's Ossian cycle, which feigned to be an ancient heroic poem unearthed by the author.

As a literary counterpart to The Federalist Papers, the poem criticized the dysfunctional Articles of Confederation, demanded a stronger central government, and rebuked the Anti-Federalists for permitting "Anarch" (Chaos) to reign over the fledgling republic. Connecticut's Anti-Federalists received particular opprobrium in the text. The authors repeatedly nodded to Shays' Rebellion as a harbinger of the Republic's dissolution.
