= Joel Barlow =

American poet, diplomat, politician and businessman (1754–1812)

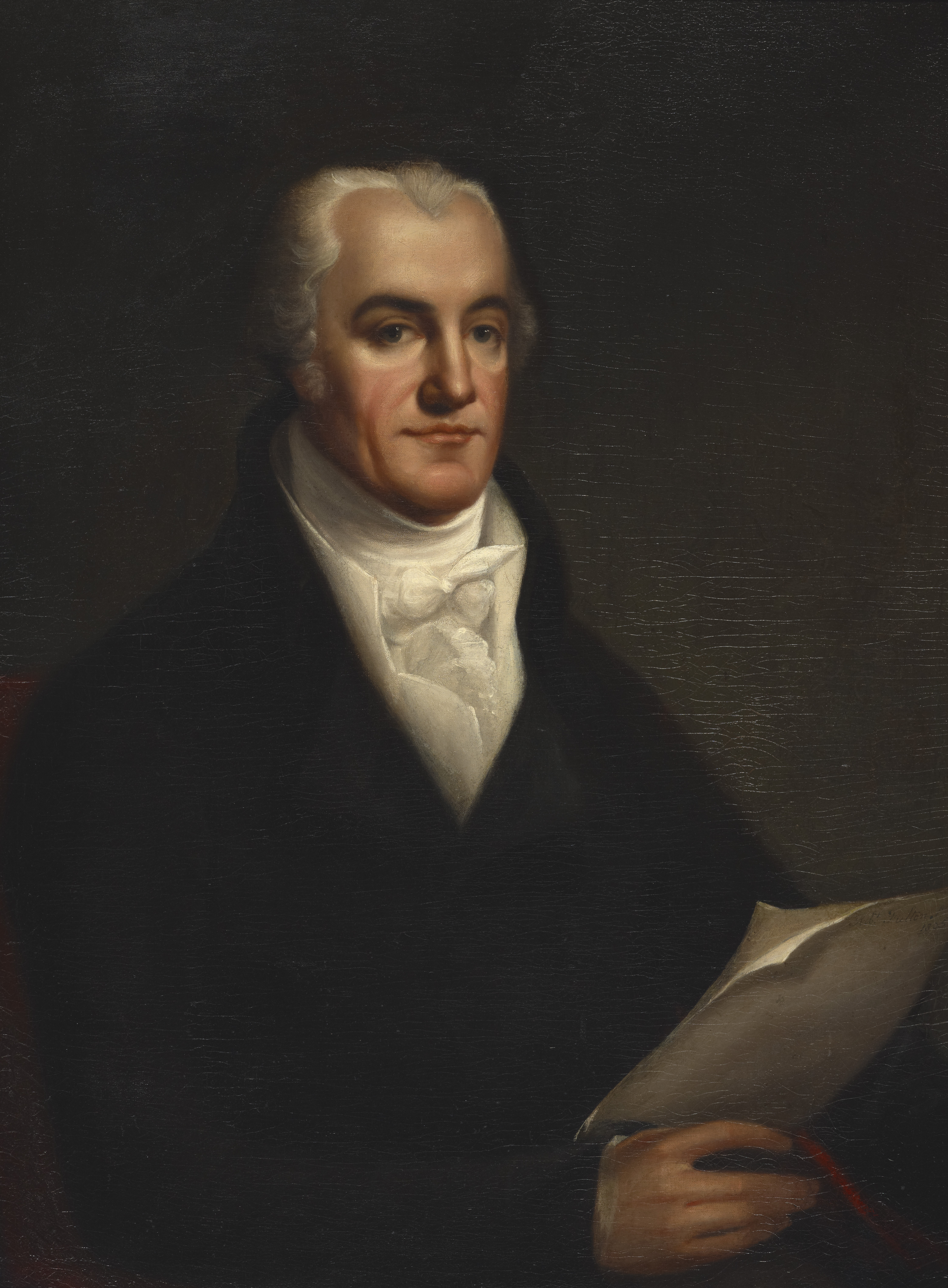
- Portrait by Robert Fulton, 1805

9th United States Minister to France
- In office November 17, 1811 – December 26, 1812
- President: James Madison
- Preceded by: John Armstrong Jr.
- Succeeded by: William H. Crawford

Personal details
- Born: March 24, 1754 Redding, Connecticut Colony
- Died: December 26, 1812 (aged 58) Żarnowiec, Duchy of Warsaw
- Education: Yale University
- Occupation: Poet; businessman; diplomat; politician

Joel Barlow (March 24, 1754 – December 26, 1812) was an American poet, diplomat, and politician. In politics, he supported the French Revolution and was an ardent Jeffersonian republican.

He worked as an agent for American speculator William Duer to set up the Scioto Company in Paris in 1788, and to sell worthless deeds to land in the Northwest Territory which it did not own. Scholars believe that he did not know the transactions were fraudulent. He stayed in Paris, becoming involved in the French Revolution. He was elected to the Assembly and given French citizenship in 1792.

In his own time, Barlow was known especially for the epic poem The Columbiad, a later version of the Vision of Columbus (1807), though modern readers rank The Hasty-Pudding (1793) more highly.

As American consul at Algiers, he helped draft the Treaty of Tripoli in 1796, to end the attacks of Barbary pirates of North Africa city states. He also served as U.S. minister to France from 1811 to his death on December 26, 1812, in Żarnowiec, Poland.

== Early life and education ==
Barlow was born in Redding, Fairfield County, Connecticut. He briefly attended Dartmouth College before he graduated from Yale College in 1778, where he was a member of Brothers in Unity, along with Noah Webster, who was a good friend at the time. In 1778, he published an anti-slavery poem entitled "The Prospect of Peace".

== Career ==
Coat of Arms of Joel Barlow

Barlow was an ardent patriot in the American Revolution. He was engaged in the Battle of Long Island and served as a chaplain for the 4th Massachusetts Brigade from September 1780 until the close of the Revolutionary War. He was an original member of the Society of the Cincinnati in the State of Massachusetts (and Connecticut). He was a Mason and he became a good friend to Thomas Paine. In 1809, Barlow was elected as a member of the American Philosophical Society in Philadelphia.

In 1783, Barlow moved to Hartford, Connecticut. In July 1784, he established a weekly paper called American Mercury, with which he was connected for a year. After "reading the law" in an established office, in 1786 he was admitted to the bar. In Hartford, Barlow became a member of a group of young writers including Lemuel Hopkins, David Humphreys, and John Trumbull, known in American literary history as the "Hartford Wits". He contributed to The Anarchiad, a series of satirico-political papers. In 1787, he published a long and ambitious poem, The Vision of Columbus, which gave him a considerable literary reputation and was once much read.

=== Land speculator ===
In 1788, he went to France as the agent of Colonel William Duer and the Scioto Land Company, which had been registered in Paris the year before. He was to sell lands in part of the newly organized Northwest Territory (this section is now in Ohio), and recruit immigrants for new settlements. He seems to have been ignorant of the fraudulent character of the company, which did not hold title to the lands it sold and failed disastrously in 1790. He had previously recruited a group of French to emigrate to America. Known as the French 500, most of them were among the founders of Gallipolis, Ohio, the second-oldest European-American city founded in the new Northwest Territory.

=== French politics and citizenship ===
In Paris, Barlow became a liberal in religion and an advanced republican in politics. He believed that "American civilization was world civilization", and was enthusiastic about the cause of world republicanism. He became involved with the French Revolution, going so far as to be elected to the French Assembly, and being granted French citizenship in 1792. Although he dedicated his "Vision of Columbus" to Louis XVI, he joined royal opponents in calling for the execution of the king. Barlow helped Thomas Paine publish the first part of The Age of Reason while Paine was imprisoned during The Reign of Terror in France.

Barlow remained abroad for several years, spending much of his time in London. There he was a member of the London Society for Constitutional Information. He also published various radical essays, including a volume entitled Advice to the Privileged Orders (1792). This was proscribed by the British government.

=== Diplomacy ===
Barlow served as American consul in Algiers from 1795 to 1797, during the period when Barbary pirates were preying on United States and European shipping. He used United States Department of State funds for bribes and ransoms to free more than 100 American merchant sailors held by pirates. He helped negotiate treaties with the Barbary states of Algiers, Tripoli, and Tunis to avert future seizures of American ships. He returned to the United States in 1805, where he lived in the national capital at his mansion, known as Kalorama, now the name of a neighborhood in Northwest Washington, D.C.

=== Poetry and writing ===
In 1807, he published the epic Columbiad, an extended edition of his Vision of Columbus. It added to his reputation in some quarters, but on the whole it was not well received.

The poem for which he is now best known is his mock heroic The Hasty-Pudding (1793), first published in New York Magazine and now a standard item in literary anthologies. In addition, Barlow published Conspiracy of Kings, a Poem addressed to the Inhabitants of Europe from another Quarter of the Globe (1792). He continued writing political essays, publishing Political Writings of Joel Barlow (2nd ed., 1796) and View of the Public Debt, Receipts and Expenditure of the United States (1800). But much of his political speculation never passed beyond his voluminous notebooks, many of which are conserved in Harvard's Houghton Library.

He also composed a satirical version of the British national anthem "God Save the King", called "God Save the Guillotine".

Historian William H. Goetzmann describes Barlow as a cosmopolitan, along with Thomas Jefferson, Benjamin Franklin, engineer Robert Fulton, and Thomas Paine, the last two of whom Barlow befriended in France. Barlow believed that the new country of America was a model civilization that prefigured the "uniting of all mankind in one religion, one language and one Newtonian harmonious whole" and thought of "the American Revolution as the opening skirmish of a world revolution on behalf of the rights of all humanity." An optimist, he believed that scientific and republican progress, along with religion and people's growing sense of humanity, would lead to the coming of the Millennium. For him, American civilization was world civilization. He projected that these concepts would coalesce around the rebuilding of the temple in Jerusalem.

=== Mission to France and death ===
In 1811, Barlow was appointed as U.S. minister to France; he sailed across the Atlantic on the USS Constitution. His task was to negotiate an end to the Berlin Decree and the Milan Decree, as well as obtain the release of American ships and crews held by the French during the Napoleonic wars. He befriended, and was served as consul and prize agent, by the United-Irish exile David Bailie Warden. In October 1812, Barlow set off for Vilnius to negotiate a treaty with the French foreign minister, who was based in Lithuania to prepare for the French invasion of Russia. By the time he arrived, the French army was already in full retreat from Moscow.

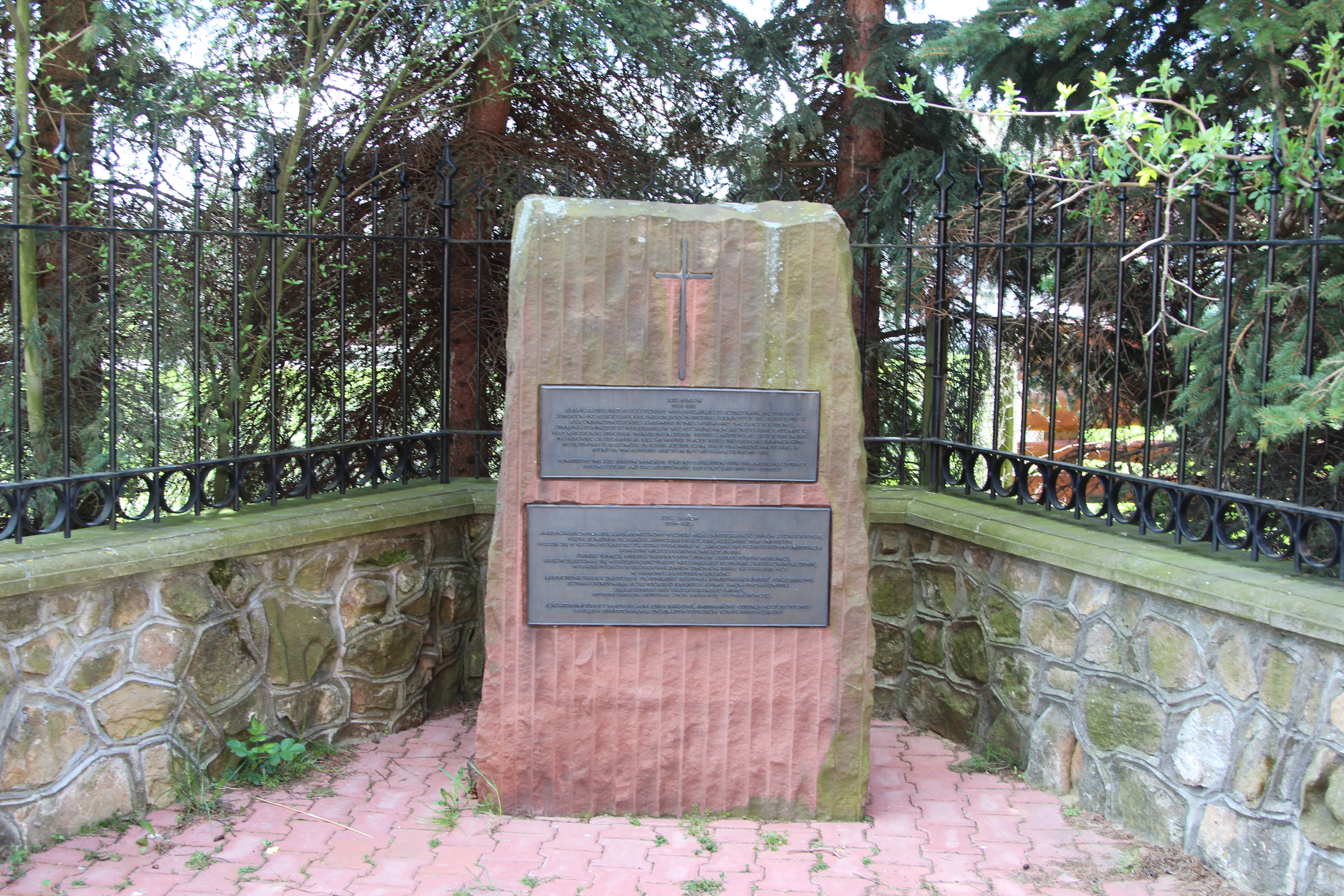
Monument to Barlow in Żarnowiec, Poland

Barlow chose to take the southerly route to return to Paris, by way of Krakow and Vienna. He became ill and died of pneumonia on December 26, 1812, in the Polish village of Żarnowiec. A monument was later erected to him there.

== Legacy ==
- Barlow was painted by Robert Fulton and John Vanderlyn (1798).
- Barlow, Ohio, is named in his honor.
- He was one of the contributing editors of the first agricultural magazine in America, the Agricultural Museum.
- Joel Barlow High School in Redding, Connecticut, is named for him.
- A monument to him was installed in the village of Żarnowiec, now in Poland, where he died.

== Bibliography ==
- 1787 - The vision of Columbus: a poem, in nine books. London
- 1792 - The conspiracy of kings; a poem: addressed to the inhabitants of Europe, from another quarter of the world. London: J. Johnson
- 1792 - A letter to the National Convention of France, on the defects in the constitution of 1791, and the extent of the amendments which ought to be applied. London: J. Johnson
- 1794 - Avis aux ordres privilégiés, dans les divers etats de l'Europe, tiré de la nécessité, dans le sens proprement dit, d'une révolution génèrale dans le principe de gouvernement. Londres: J. Jonhson
- 1795 - A letter, addressed to the people of Piedmont, on the advantages of the French Revolution, and the necessity of adopting its principles in Italy. London: Daniel Isaac Aeton
- 1800 - Letters from Paris, to the citizens of the United States of America, on the system of policy hitherto pursued by their government relative to their commercial intercourse with England and France, &c.. London: James Ridgway
- 1970 - Works of Joel Barlow. Volume I: Prose; Volume II: Poetry. Gainesville, Fla.,: Scholars' Facsimiles & Reprints

Diplomatic posts
Preceded by John Armstrong, Jr.	U.S. Minister to France; 1811–1812	Succeeded by William H. Crawford
