= John Trumbull (poet) =

American poet

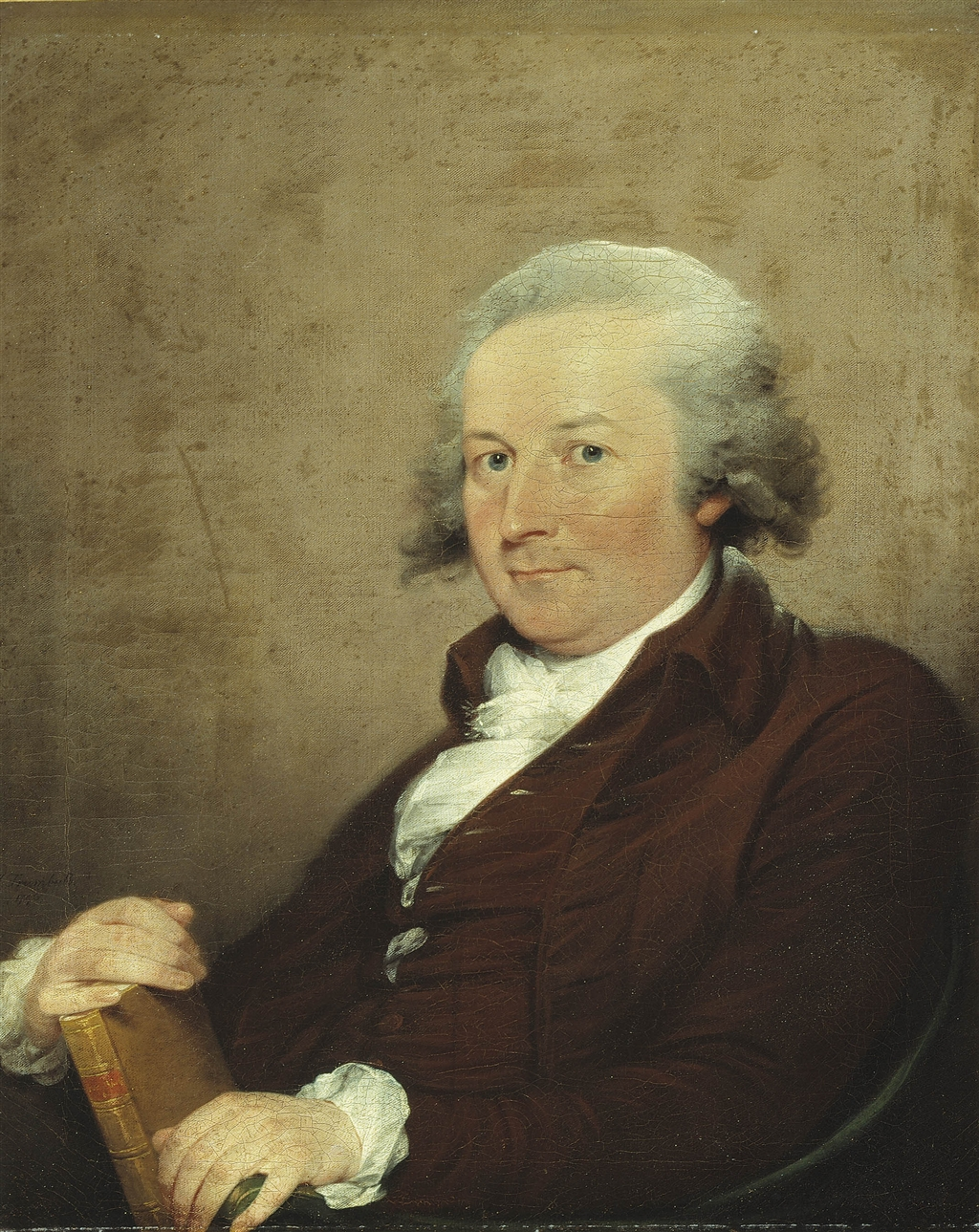
A portrait of Trumbull painted by his cousin of the same name in 1793

John Trumbull (April 24, 1750 – May 11, 1831) was an American poet.

== Biography ==
Trumbull was born in what is now Watertown, Connecticut, where his father was a Congregational preacher. At the age of seven he passed his entrance examinations at Yale University, but did not enter until 1763; he graduated in 1767, studied law there, and in 1771–1773 was a tutor (taking part in teaching and supervising the undergraduates).

While studying at Yale, he contributed to ten essays in 1769 and 1770, titled "The Meddler", imitating The Spectator, to the Boston Chronicle, and in 1770 similar essays, signed " The Correspondent" to The Connecticut Journal and New Haven Post Boy.

While a tutor he wrote his first satire in verse, The Progress of Dulness (1772–1773), an attack in three poems on educational methods of his time. His great poem, which ranks him with Philip Freneau and Francis Hopkinson as an American political satirist during the American Revolutionary War, was M'Fingal, the first canto of which, "The Town-Meeting", appeared in 1776 (dated 1775).

In Canto IV, "The Vision," the last canto of M'Fingal, the Scottish background of the protagonist and accounts of the North Carolina Highlanders are featured, along with discrimination by the Whigs between Tories and the British soldiery. The mock epic presentation of the pageant of the war is evident in this canto, and the economic impact of the war is given its fullest treatment in the burlesque of the Ghost of Continental Money which ends the vision.

After the Revolutionary War, Trumbull was a staunch Federalist, and with the "Hartford Wits" David Humphreys, Joel Barlow and Lemuel Hopkins, wrote "The Anarchiad", a poem directed against the enemies of a firm central government. He was elected a Fellow of the American Academy of Arts and Sciences in 1791.

He then turned to politics, serving as State's Attorney for Hartford County, Connecticut, in 1789, then in the state legislature in 1792 and 1800. From 1801 to 1819, he served as a judge on the Connecticut Superior Court, and from 1808 to 1819 as a member of the Supreme Court of Errors. In 1825, he moved to the capital of the Michigan Territory, Detroit, where he died six years later. Prior to moving, he was one of the 31 founding charter members of the Connecticut Historical Society and was elected its first President.

== Works ==
- The Progress of Dulness (1772–73)
- M'Fingal (1775–82)
- The Poetical Works of John Trumbull, LLD

== Commemoration ==
- Trumbull Avenue in Downtown Detroit is named after Trumbull. Old Tiger Stadium, the former stadium for the Detroit Tigers of Major League Baseball, was located on the avenue.
- John Trumbull Primary School in Watertown, Connecticut is named after him.
- M'Fingal Road, also in Watertown, Connecticut, was named after his poem.
