= Hartford Wits =

18th century group of young writers from Connecticut

The Hartford Wits were a group of young writers from Connecticut in the late 18th century including John Trumbull, Timothy Dwight, David Humphreys, Joel Barlow, and Lemuel Hopkins. Originally the Connecticut Wits, the group formed in the late 18th century as a literary society at Yale College and then assumed a new name, the Hartford Wits. Their writings satirized an outmoded curriculum and, more significantly, society and the politics of the mid-1780s.

== American Revolution ==
Their dissatisfaction with the Articles of Confederation appeared in The Anarchiad in 1786 and 1787, written by Humphreys, Joel Barlow, Trumbull (the oldest Wit), and Hopkins. In satirizing democratic society, this mock-epic promoted the federal union delineated by the Constitutional Convention in Philadelphia in 1787.

Despite writing in a satiric tone, some of the Wits, especially Humphreys and Barlow, joined the Continental Army and fought for American independence in the American Revolutionary War. Dwight became a minister, serving as chaplain to the Connecticut Continental Brigade and also wrote poems and songs, including several devoted to the soldiers of the American Revolution, including "Columbia":

Columbia, Columbia, to glory rise,
The queen of the world, and the child of the skies!

Trumbull was the only member of the Wits who did not join the Continental Army, but he wrote the satiric poem, "M’Fingal", in which the British cause was mocked. Humphreys became colonel of the Continental Army and published "Address to the Armies of the United States of America" and other patriotic poems.

== Later careers ==
The Connecticut Wits eventually went in divergent directions. After The Anarchiad, Trumbull turned away from poetry and increasingly devoted his attention to law and politics. Barlow ultimately repudiated the federalist politics of the Wits altogether. Dwight became the eighth president of Yale University in 1795 and used his position as a platform from which to continue his attacks on the enemies of social order. The second generation of Wits included physician and playwright Elihu Hubbard Smith.
