= Lemuel Hopkins =

American poet and physician

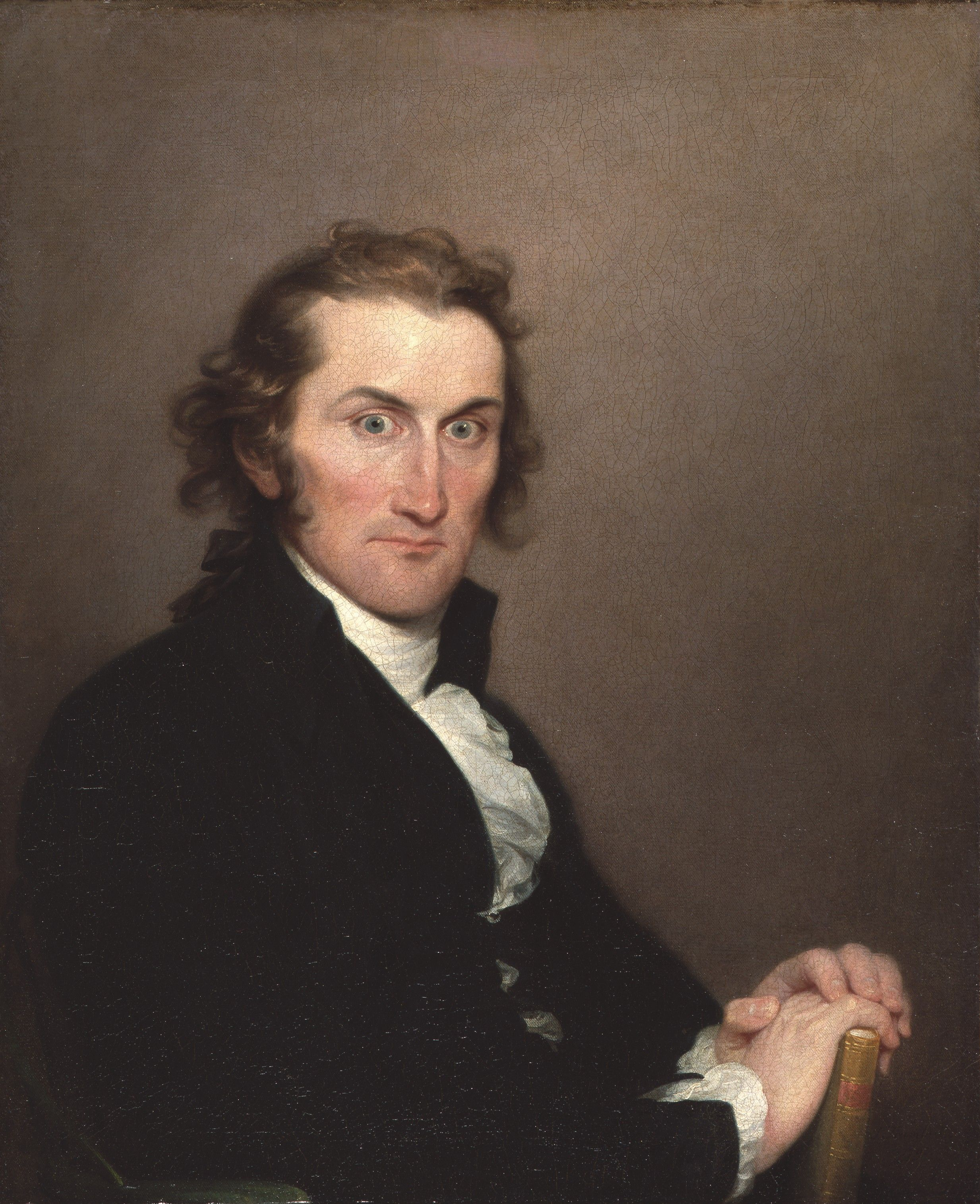
- Born: June 19, 1750; Waterbury, Connecticut, British America
- Died: April 14, 1801 (aged 50); Hartford, Connecticut, US
- Resting place: Ancient Burying Ground
- Occupations: Poet, physician
- Writing career
- Language: English
- Genre: Satire
- Literary movement: Hartford Wits

Lemuel Hopkins (June 19, 1750 – April 14, 1801) was an American poet and physician.

== Biography ==
Hopkins was a member of the Hartford Wits, a group of literary satirists active in the late eighteenth century. A politically conservative Federalist, he coauthored The Anarchiad (1786–1787), a lengthy satiric poem critical of popular democracy and of the Articles of Confederation. His fellow authors on the poem were three other leading Wits: David Humphreys, Joel Barlow, and John Trumbull. Hopkins practiced medicine in Litchfield and Hartford and received an honorary Master of Arts degree from Yale University in 1784.

=== Death ===
Hopkins died of pneumonia and was interred at Hartford's Ancient Burying Ground.
