= Alsop =

Alsop, Allsop or Allsopp may refer to:

== People ==
=== In arts and media ===
- Anthony Alsop (died 1726), English poetical writer
- Frederick W. Allsopp (1867–1946), American author and philanthropist
- George Alsop (born c.1638), English-American writer, historian and settler
- Jack Allsopp (born 1975), English musician, stage name Just Jack
- Jane Allsop (born 1975), Australian actress
- Joseph Alsop (1910–1989), American journalist
- Kenneth Allsop (1920–1973), British broadcaster, author and naturalist
- Kirstie Allsopp (born 1971), British TV presenter
- Marin Alsop (born 1956), American conductor
- Peter Alsop (born 1946), American musician and children's entertainer
- Peter Allsop (1946–2025), British musicologist
- Peter F. B. Alsop (1935–2014), Australian engineer and historian
- Richard Alsop (1761–1815), American author
- Richard Allsopp, West Indian lexicographer
- Sofie Allsopp (born 1980), British television presenter
- Stewart Alsop (1914–1974), American newspaper columnist and political analyst
- Susan Mary Alsop (1918–2004), American socialite and writer
- Thomas Allsop (1795–1880), English stockbroker and author
- Will Alsop (1947–2018), British architect

=== In politics ===
==== United Kingdom ====
- George Allsopp (1846–1907), English brewer and politician
- Henry Allsopp, 1st Baron Hindlip (1811–1887), British businessman and Member of Parliament
- Kate Allsop, British politician
- Samuel Allsopp, 2nd Baron Hindlip (1842–1897), British businessman and Member of Parliament

==== United States ====
- Donald Alsop (born 1927), American federal judge
- John Alsop (1724–1794), American delegate to the Continental Congress
- John T. Alsop (1887–1957), American politician, mayor of Jacksonville, Florida, 1923–1937
- Joseph Wright Alsop IV (1876–1953), American politician and insurance executive

==== Elsewhere ====
- George Waters Allsopp (1769–1837), Canadian seigneur, businessman and political figure
- James Allsop, Chief Justice of the Federal Court of Australia
- Robert Alsop (1814–1871), Newfoundland merchant and politician

=== In sport ===
==== Cricket ====
- Frederic Allsopp (1857–1928), English cricketer
- George Allsop (1864–1927), South African cricketer
- Herbert Allsopp (1855–1920), English cricketer and soldier
- Thomas Allsopp (1880–1919), English cricketer and footballer
- Tom Alsop (born 1995), English cricketer

==== Football ====
- Danny Allsopp (born 1978), Australian football (soccer) player
- Gilbert Alsop (1908–1992), English footballer
- Julian Alsop (born 1973), English footballer
- Ryan Allsop (born 1992), English professional footballer
- Thomas Allsopp (1880–1919), English cricketer and footballer
- William Allsop (1912–1997), English footballer

==== Other sports ====
- Brian Allsop (1936–1989), Australian rugby league player
- Fred Alsop (born 1938), British long jumper
- Fred Allsopp (1869–1912), British jockey
- Ian Alsop (1943–2020), Scottish competitive track cyclist
- Ted Allsopp (1926–2024), Australian race walker
- William Jonathan Alsop (1901–1964), Welsh boxer who fought under the name Young Allsopp

=== In other fields ===
- Charles Allsopp, 6th Baron Hindlip (1940–2024), British businessman
- Christine Allsopp (born on 19 January 1947), Church of England priest, former Archdeacon of Northampton
- Christopher Allsopp (1941–2025), British economist, director of the Oxford Institute for Energy Studies
- George Allsopp (disambiguation), various, including:
  - George Allsopp (fur trader) (c.1733–1805), British-born fur trader in Canada
- Peter Allsop (publisher) (1924–2010), British barrister and legal publisher
- Vincent Alsop (1630–1703), British Nonconformist clergyman

== Fictional people ==
- Madge Allsop, fictitious character invented by satirist Barry Humphries as the long-time companion of "Dame Edna Everage"

== Other uses ==
- Alsop en le Dale, a village in Derbyshire, England
- Alsop, Virginia, an unincorporated community
- Alsop House may refer to:
  - Richard Alsop IV House (built 1838–1839), historic home in Middletown, Connecticut, designated a U.S. National Historic Landmark as "Alsop House"
  - Carroll Alsop House (built 1948), Oskaloosa, Iowa, a Frank Lloyd Wright-designed home
- Alsop High School in Walton, Liverpool, England
- Arthur Allsopp Shield, trophy symbolizing the Under 16 Boys championship of the Australian Softball Federation
- Samuel Allsopp & Sons, one of the largest brewery companies operating in Burton upon Trent, England
