= Charles Richard Alsop =

American politician

The Honorable Charles Richard Alsop

Mayor of Middletown, Connecticut
- In office 1843–1846
- Preceded by: Noah A. Phelps

Personal details
- Born: December 25, 1802 Middletown, Connecticut, U.S.
- Died: March 5, 1865 (aged 62) Middletown, Connecticut, U.S.
- Spouse: Margaret Elenore Armstrong
- Parent(s): Joseph Wright Alsop; Lucy Whittlesey
- Education: Yale College

Charles Richard Alsop (December 25, 1802 – March 5, 1865) was an American politician.

== Early life ==
Alsop was born in Middletown, Connecticut on Christmas Day, December 25, 1802. He was the son of Joseph Wright Alsop (1772–1844) and Lucy (née Whittlesey) Alsop (1773–1856). His sister, Lucy Alsop, was married to Henry Chauncey, of the firm of Alsop & Chauncey, who founded the Pacific Mail Steamship Company in 1848.

He was descended from a family that was long prominent in business and politics, including his cousin Richard Alsop and great-uncle Continental Congressman John Alsop. Charles' younger brother, Joseph Wright Alsop, Jr. (1804–1878), was the father of Joseph Wright Alsop III (1838–1891), who was the father of Joseph Wright Alsop IV (1876–1953) who married Corinne Douglas Robinson (1886–1971), a niece of Theodore Roosevelt, and were the parents of Joseph Wright Alsop V (1910–1989) and Stewart Alsop (1914–1974), both American newspaper journalists and political analysts.

He graduated from Yale College in 1821.

== Career ==
After studying law with Chancellor James Kent, and Daniel Lord, Esq of New York, he was admitted to the bar in his native state, and commenced the practice of his profession, residing in Middletown.

From 1843 to 1846, he was Mayor of Middletown succeeding Noah A. Phelps who resigned. While mayor, Alsop started the movement for, and was an original incorporator of, the New York and Boston Railroad. He also obtained the charter for the Middletown Railroad, which he served as president of until it later became a part of the Hartford and New Haven Railroad. In 1855, he represented the 18th Senatorial District in the Connecticut Legislature. He was a member of the Corporation of Yale College in 1855-6.

== Personal life ==
Alsop was married to Margaret Elenore Armstrong (1814–1897). Together, they were the parents of:

- Lucy Chauncey Alsop (1834–1922), she never married, but was engaged to her cousin Theodore William Riley died in 1839 from tuberculosis.
- Catherine Beatty Alsop (1835–1908), who married Rev. Christopher Starr Leffingwell (1827–1902), the son of Lucius Wooster Leffingwell, in 1857.
- Richard Alsop (1838–1860), who died at Valparaíso, Chile and never married.
- Charles Henry Alsop (1840–1922), who married Elizabeth Gould Beers (d. 1924) in 1862.
- Francis Oliver Alsop (1853–1929), who married Sarah Ranger Bainbridge (1855–1936), the daughter of Robert and Charlotte (née Ranger) Bainbridge, in 1879.

He died in Middletown, March 5, 1865, aged 62 years.
