= John deKoven Alsop =

American politician (1915–2000)

Member of the Connecticut State House of Representatives
- In office 1947–1949

Personal details
- Born: July 4, 1915 Avon, Connecticut, U.S.
- Died: April 6, 2000 (aged 84) Old Saybrook, Connecticut, U.S.
- Party: Republican
- Parent(s): Joseph Wright Alsop IV; Corinne Douglas Robinson
- Relatives: See Roosevelt family
- Education: Kingswood School; Groton School
- Alma mater: Yale University
- Occupation: Politician, soldier

Military service
- Allegiance: United States
- Branch/service: United States Army
- Rank: Captain
- Battles/wars: World War II
- Awards: Bronze Star Medal

John deKoven Alsop (July 4, 1915 – April 6, 2000) was an American politician, insurance executive, and soldier. A Republican, Alsop served in the Connecticut House of Representatives and unsuccessfully ran for governor of Connecticut in 1958 and 1962. He was known as "one of Connecticut's most influential and colorful Republicans."

== Early life ==
Alsop was born and raised in Avon, Connecticut, from an old Yankee family. He was the youngest of four children born to Joseph Wright Alsop IV (1876–1953) and Corinne Douglas Robinson (1886–1971), both of whom also served in the Connecticut General Assembly. His brothers were journalists Joseph Alsop and Stewart Alsop.

Alsop's family included politicians such as Continental Congressman John Alsop, Richard Alsop, John Alsop King, and James Monroe. His paternal grandfather, Dr. Joseph Wright Alsop III, was the Democratic nominee for Lt. Governor of Connecticut in 1891. Through his mother, he was descended from the Oyster Bay branch of the Roosevelt family, his maternal grandmother was Corinne Roosevelt Robinson, his grand-uncle was President Theodore Roosevelt, and Eleanor Roosevelt was his first cousin once removed.

He graduated from Kingswood School in West Hartford, and like his older brother, Stewart, Alsop attended Groton School, graduating in 1933, and four years later, from Yale University, where he was a member of Scroll and Key.

== Career ==
Following his graduation from Yale, he began working at Smith, Barney & Company in New York. In 1942, he enlisted in the U.S. Army and served with the Office of Strategic Services in England, France and China. During the War, Alsop was a member of a seven-man British-American team that parachuted into behind enemy lines in Nazi-occupied France and worked with resistance fighters to "spot enemy airfields and teach underground tactics to the French guerilla army." He was the recipient of a Bronze Star with cluster and was eventually promoted to Captain.

Alsop served as president of the Covenant Insurance Group in Hartford for 27 years, a company that was founded by his father in the 1920s as Hartford County Mutual Fire Insurance Company and the Connecticut Valley Mutual Hail Insurance Company. Along with John Filer, the former chairman of Aetna, and DeRoy Thomas of ITT Hartford, he was one of the principal organizers of the Insurance Association of Connecticut, which became a significant lobbying force in Connecticut on insurance issues. He retired in 1980.

=== Political career ===
From 1947 until 1949, Alsop, who was referred to as a "blue-blooded moderate" and "Connecticut Yankee Republican" was elected and served two terms in the Connecticut General Assembly representing Avon, allied with the liberal wing of the Republican party. In office, he sponsored and championed a bill known as the Alsop Birth Control bill which would "permit physicians to prescribe the use of contraceptives for married women whose lives may be endangered by pregnancy." At the end of the 1949 legislative session, he also helped push through three desegregation bills submitted by the Connecticut NAACP that outlawed racial discrimination in public accommodations, public-housing projects, and the National Guard.

He was an early backer of Dwight D. Eisenhower's campaign for president in 1952, serving as a state vice chairman for the campaign. During the campaign, he was "credited with creating the amiable 1952 epithet 'egghead' in the modern political vocabulary."

In 1958, Alsop sought the Republican nomination for governor of Connecticut, but lost in the primary to state comptroller Fred R. Zeller by a count of 276 votes to 349 votes, who himself overwhelmingly lost to Gov. Abraham Ribicoff in the general election. He attempted again in 1962, this time winning the nomination over Edwin H. May Jr. on the eighth ballot at the party convention after a deadlock of more than ten hours. Alsop ultimately lost the election to the incumbent Governor and former Lieutenant Governor, John N. Dempsey, who served from January 1961 to January 1971, by 482,671 votes to 549,030 votes for Dempsey. While he did not seek the nomination again or hold public office, he continued to be involved in the party and represented Connecticut on the Republican National Committee from 1968 until 1984.

== Personal life ==
On June 19, 1947, Alsop was married to Augusta McLane "Gussie" Robinson (1924–2015) at Trinity Episcopal Church in Hartford, Connecticut. She was the daughter of Lucius F. Robinson and Augusta (née McLane) Robinson. Gussie attended Miss Porter's School in Farmington, Connecticut and served as a Red Cross nurses' aide during World War II. In 1986, the family moved to Old Lyme, Connecticut, from their farm on Talcott Notch in Avon, where he was born. Together, John and Augusta were the parents of four children, three of whom lived to maturity, a son and two daughters:

- John deKoven Alsop, who married Janice Stuver and served as the Assistant Attorney for the state of Maine.
- Mary Oliver Alsop, who married Peter Farnum Culver in 1978.
- Augusta McLane Alsop, who married Michael David Hoy, a woodworker.
- Samuel Alsop, who died as an infant.

Alsop died on April 6, 2000, at a health care center in Old Saybrook, Connecticut. His funeral was held at St. Ann Church in Old Lyme, Connecticut.

Party political offices
Preceded by Fred R. Zeller	Republican nominee for Governor of Connecticut (1962)	Succeeded by E. Clayton Gengras
