= Elizabeth Winthrop =

American writer (born 1948)

Elizabeth Winthrop (née Alsop; born September 14, 1948) is an American writer. She is the author of more than sixty published books, primarily children's fiction. Winthrop wrote the middle-grade novel, The Castle in the Attic and its sequel, The Battle for the Castle, which, together, have been nominated for 23 state book awards and are considered children's classics.

== Life ==
Elizabeth Winthrop Alsop was born in Washington, D.C. She is a daughter of the newspaper columnist and political analyst Stewart Alsop and Patricia Alsop, a retired American Red Cross medical research technologist. One of her siblings is investor and pundit Stewart Alsop Jr. They respectively are a niece and nephew of Joseph Alsop while their paternal grandparents were Joseph Wright Alsop IV (1876–1953) and Corinne Douglas Robinson (1886–1971). Corinne was the daughter of Corinne Roosevelt Robinson as well as a first cousin of First Lady Eleanor Roosevelt and a niece of U.S. President Theodore Roosevelt.

Winthrop graduated from Sarah Lawrence College. She married and divorced once before 2005. On March 26 of that year she married Robert Jason Bosseau, director of the drama program at Riverdale Country School in the Bronx, New York.

== Writer ==
Her memoir, Daughter of Spies: Wartime Secrets, Family Lies was published under her maiden name, Elizabeth Winthrop Alsop by Regal House. Her most recent children's book is Maia and the Monster Baby (Holiday House, 2012) illustrated by Amanda Haley. Her most recent historical novel, Counting on Grace was chosen as a Notable Book of the Year by the American Library Association, the National Council of Social Studies, the International Reading Association and the Children's Book Council among others.

Some of her most popular picture books include Dumpy La Rue, Shoes, Dog Show, Squashed in the Middle, The First Christmas Stocking, and The Biggest Parade.

== Selected books ==
- Daughter of Spies: Wartime Secrets, Family Lies (Regal House, 2022)
- Counting on Grace, Jane Adams Peace Prize
- The Biggest Parade Illustrated by Mark Ulriksen (Henry Holt, 2006); ISBN 9780805076851, ISBN 0805076859
- Squashed in the Middle Illustrated by Pat Cummings (Henry Holt, 2005) ALA Notable Book
- The Battle for the Castle (Yearling, 1994)
- The Castle in the Attic (Yearling, 1985) Dorothy Canfield Fisher Children's Book Award

== Complete list of books ==
- Daughter of Spies: Wartime Secrets, Family Lies, Elizabeth Winthrop Alsop, 9781646032747
- Maia and the Monster Baby (Holiday House, 2012) Illustrated by Amanda Haley; ISBN 0823425185, ISBN 9780823425181
- Island Justice (new eBook format, 2012); ASIN B007VSRBVU
- The Biggest Parade (Henry Holt, 2006) Illustrated by Mark Ulriksen; ISBN 0-8050-7685-9, ISBN 9780805076851
- Counting on Grace (Wendy Lamb Books/Random House, 2006); ISBN 0-385-74644-X, ISBN 978-0-55348783-1
- The First Christmas Stocking (Delacorte Books, 2006) Illustrated by Bagram Ibatoulline; ISBN 0385-32804-4, ISBN 9780385328043
- Squashed in the Middle (Henry Holt, 2005) Illustrated by Pat Cummings; ISBN 0805064974, ISBN 9780805064971
- Dog Show (Henry Holt, 2004) Illustrated by Mark Ulriksen; ISBN 0-8050-7111-3, ISBN 9780805071115
- Dancing Granny (Marshall Cavendish, 2003) Illustrated by Salvatore Murdocca; ISBN 0761451412, ISBN 9780761451419
- The Red Hot Rattoons (Henry Holt, 2003) Illustrated by Betsy Lewin; ISBN 0805072292, ISBN 0-8050-7986-6, ISBN 9780805079869 (Audio version)
- Halloween Hats (Henry Holt, 2002) Illustrated by Sue Truesdell; ISBN 0805063862, ISBN 9780805063868
- Dear Mr. President: Franklin Delano Roosevelt: Letters from a Mill Town Girl (Winslow Press, 2001); ISBN 1-890817-61-9, ISBN 9781890817619 (Audio version)
- Dumpy La Rue (Henry Holt, 2001) Illustrated by Betsy Lewin; ISBN 0-8050-6385-4, ISBN 0-8050-7535-6
- Promises (Clarion, 2000) Illustrated by Betsy Lewin; ISBN 0395822726, ISBN 9780395822722
- As the Crow Flies (Clarion, 1998) Illustrated by Joan Sandin; ISBN 0395776120, ISBN 9780395776124
- In My Mother's House (Doubleday, 1998); ISBN 0385171218, ISBN 9780385171212
- Island Justice (William Morrow, 1998);ISBN 0688169686, ISBN 9780688169688 EBook, ISBN 978-1-61909-009-5
- The Little Humpbacked Horse: A Russian Tale (Clarion, 1997) Illustrated by Alexander Koshkin; ISBN 0395653614, ISBN 9780395653616
- Bear and Roly-Poly (Holiday House, 1996) Illustrated by Patience Brewster; ISBN 0823411974, ISBN 9780823411979
- I'm the Boss (Holiday House, 1994) Illustrated by Mary Morgan; ISBN 0823411133, ISBN 9780823411139
- Asleep in a Heap (Holiday House, 1993) Illustrated by Mary Morgan; ISBN 0823409929, ISBN 9780823409921
- The Battle for the Castle (Holiday House, 1993); ISBN 0823410102, ISBN 9780823410101, ISBN 044040942X Audio, ISBN 0807281891, ISBN 9780807281895 (Audio version)
- A Very Noisy Girl (Holiday House, 1991); Illustrated by Ellen Weiss; ISBN 0823408582, ISBN 9780823408580
- Bear's Christmas Surprise (Holiday House, 1991); Illustrated by Patience Brewster; ISBN 0823408884, ISBN 9780823408887, ISBN 044041492X, ISBN 9780440414926, ISBN 0750011971, ISBN 9780750011976
- Vasilissa the Beautiful (HarperCollins, 1991); Illustrated by Alexander Koshkin ISBN 006021662X, ISBN 9780060216627, ISBN 0064433455, ISBN 9780064433457
- Luke's Bully (Viking/Penguin, 1990); Illustrated by Pat Grant Porter; ISBN 0670831034, ISBN 9780670831036, ISBN 0140343296, ISBN 9780140343298
- The Best Friends Club: A Lizzie and Harold Story (Lothrop, Lee and Shepard, 1989) Illustrated by Martha Weston; ISBN 0688075835, ISBN 9780688075835, ISBN 0153036362, ISBN 9780153036361
- Sledding (Harper and Row, 1989) Illustrated by Sarah Wilson; ISBN 0060265280, ISBN 9780060265281, ISBN 0590480812, ISBN 9780590480819
- Bear and Mrs. Duck (Holiday House, 1988) Illustrated by Patience Brewster; ISBN 0823406873, ISBN 9780823406876, ISBN 0823408434, ISBN 9780823408436
- Maggie and the Monster (Holiday Housem 1987) Illustrated by Tomie dePaola; ISBN 0399247114, ISBN 978-0-399-24711-8, ISBN 0823406393, ISBN 9780823406395
- Lizzie and Harold (Lothrop, Lee and Shepard, 1986) Illustrated by Martha Weston; ISBN 0688027113, ISBN 9780688027117
- Shoes (Harper and Row, 1986) Illustrated by William Joyce; ISBN 0060265922, ISBN 9780060265922, ISBN 0064431711, ISBN 9780064431712, ISBN 0694008443, ISBN 9780694008445
- The Story of the Nativity (Simon & Schuster, 1986) Illustrated by Ruth Sanderson; ISBN 0671630199, ISBN 9780671630195
- The Castle in the Attic (Holiday House, 1985); ISBN 0823405796, ISBN 9780823405794, ISBN 0440409411, ISBN 9780440409410, ISBN 0862783070, ISBN 9780862783075, ISBN 0807277878 (Audio), ISBN 9780807277874 (Audio)
- Happy Easter, Mother Duck (First Little Golden Books, 1985) Illustrated by Diane Dawson Hearn; ISBN 0307681572, ISBN 978-0307681577
- He Is Risen: The Easter Story (Holiday House, 1985) Illustrated by Charles Mikolaycak; ISBN 0823405478, ISBN 9780823405473
- My First Book of the Planets (Western Pub. Co., 1985), Illustrated by John Nez; ISBN 0307020053, ISBN 9780307020055
- Tough Eddie (Puffin, 1985) Illustrated by Lillian Hoban; ISBN 0525444963, ISBN 9780525444961, ISBN 0140331298, ISBN 9780140331295
- Being Brave Is Best (Tale from the Care Bears) (Parker Brothers, 1984); ISBN 0910313199, ISBN 9780910313193
- Belinda's Hurricane (Dutton, 1984) Illustrated by Wendy Watson; ISBN 0525441069, ISBN 9780525441069
- The Christmas Pageant (Goldencraft, 1984), Illustrated by Kathy Wilburn; ISBN 0307681505, ISBN 9780307681508
- Grover Sleeps Over (Sesame Street, A Growing Up Book) (Western Pub. Co., 1984) Illustrated by Maggie Swanson; ISBN 0307120104, ISBN 9780307120106
- The Shoelace Box (Golden Press, 1984), Illustrated by Kathy Wilburn; ISBN 978-0-307-02054-3
- A Child Is Born: The Christmas Story (Holiday House, 1983), Illustrated by Charles Mikolaycak; ISBN 0823404722, ISBN 9780823404728
- Katharine's Doll (Dutton, 1983) Illustrated by Marilyn Hafner; ISBN 0525440615, ISBN 9780525440611, ISBN 0525447385, ISBN 9780525447382
- I Think He Likes Me (Harper and Row, 1980), Illustrated by Denise Saldutti; ISBN 0060265515, ISBN 9780060265519
- Miranda in the Middle (Holiday House, 1980); ISBN 0553151584
- Sloppy Kisses (Macmillan, 1980), Illustrated by Anne Burgess; ISBN 0-02-793210-9, ISBN 0140504338
- Are You Sad, Mama? (Harper and Row, 1979), Illustrated Donna Diamond; ISBN 0-06-026539-6
- Journey to the Bright Kingdom (Holiday House, 1979), Illustrated by Charles Mikolaycak; ISBN 0823403572
- Marathon Miranda (Holiday House, 1979); ISBN 0553150731
- Knock, Knock, Who's There (Holiday House, 1978); ISBN 0823403378, ISBN 0440947588
- Potbellied Possums (Holiday House, 1977), Illustrated by Barbara McClintock; ISBN 0823402894, ISBN 978-0823402892
- That's Mine (Holiday House, 1977), Illustrated by Emily McCully; ISBN 0823403084, ISBN 9780823403080
- A Little Demonstration of Affection (Harper and Row, 1975); ISBN 0440948754, ISBN 9780440948759
- Walking Away (Harper and Row, 1973), Illustrated by Noelle Massena; ISBN 0060265337, ISBN 9780060265335
- Bunk Beds (Harper and Row, 1972), Illustrated by Ronald Himler; ISBN 0060265310, ISBN 9780060265311
