= Sereno Edwards Dwight =

American lawyer

Sereno Edwards Dwight (May 18, 1786 – November 30, 1850) was an American writer, educator, and Congregationalist minister, who served as Chaplain of the Senate.

== Early years ==
Dwight was the fifth son of Yale College President Timothy Dwight IV and his wife Mary Woolsey, born in Greenfield Hill in Fairfield, Connecticut. He graduated Yale in 1803, was a tutor there in 1806–1810, and successfully practised law in New Haven, Connecticut in 1810–1816. For several years during this time, he worked ten hours each day preparing an exhaustive "Geography".

== Ministry ==
Licensed to preach in 1816, he served as the Chaplain of the Senate of the United States for one year's term (December 16, 1816 – December 19, 1817). Dwight was ordained on September 3, 1817, at Park Street Church, Boston.

Thereafter, he served as pastor of the Park Street Church, Boston, in 1817–1826, where he greatly influenced the young hymn writer and clergyman Ray Palmer (1808–1887), author of "My Faith Looks Up to Thee", among others. In 1833–1835 he was president of Hamilton College, Clinton, New York. His career was wrecked by accidental mercury poisoning, which interfered with his work in Boston and at Hamilton College, and made his life after 1839 solitary and comparatively uninfluential.

His publications include Life of David Brainerd (1822); Life and Works of Jonathan Edwards (ten volumes, 1830), of whom he was a great-grandson; The Hebrew Wife (1836), an argument against marriage with a deceased wife's sister; and Select Discourses (1851); to which was prefixed a biographical sketch by his brother William Dwight (1795–1865), who was also successively a lawyer and a Congregational preacher.

== Personal life ==
In August 1811, Dwight married Susan Edwards Daggett (1788 - 1839), the daughter of David Daggett, of New Haven, Connecticut. Their only daughter did not survive infancy.

== Publications ==
- William Theodore Dwight, Select Discourses' (1851)

Religious titles
Preceded by John Glendy	Chaplain of the United States Senate; December 16, 1816 – December 8, 1817	Succeeded by William Dickinson Hawley
