= George Allsopp =

George Allsopp may refer to:

- George Allsopp (Canadian merchant) (c. 1733–1805), British-born fur trader in Canada
- George Waters Allsopp (1769–1837), seigneur, businessman and political figure in Lower Canada
- George Allsopp (British politician) (1846–1907), English brewer and Conservative Party politician
