= 1962 Connecticut gubernatorial election =

- November 6, 1962
- Turnout: 81.52%
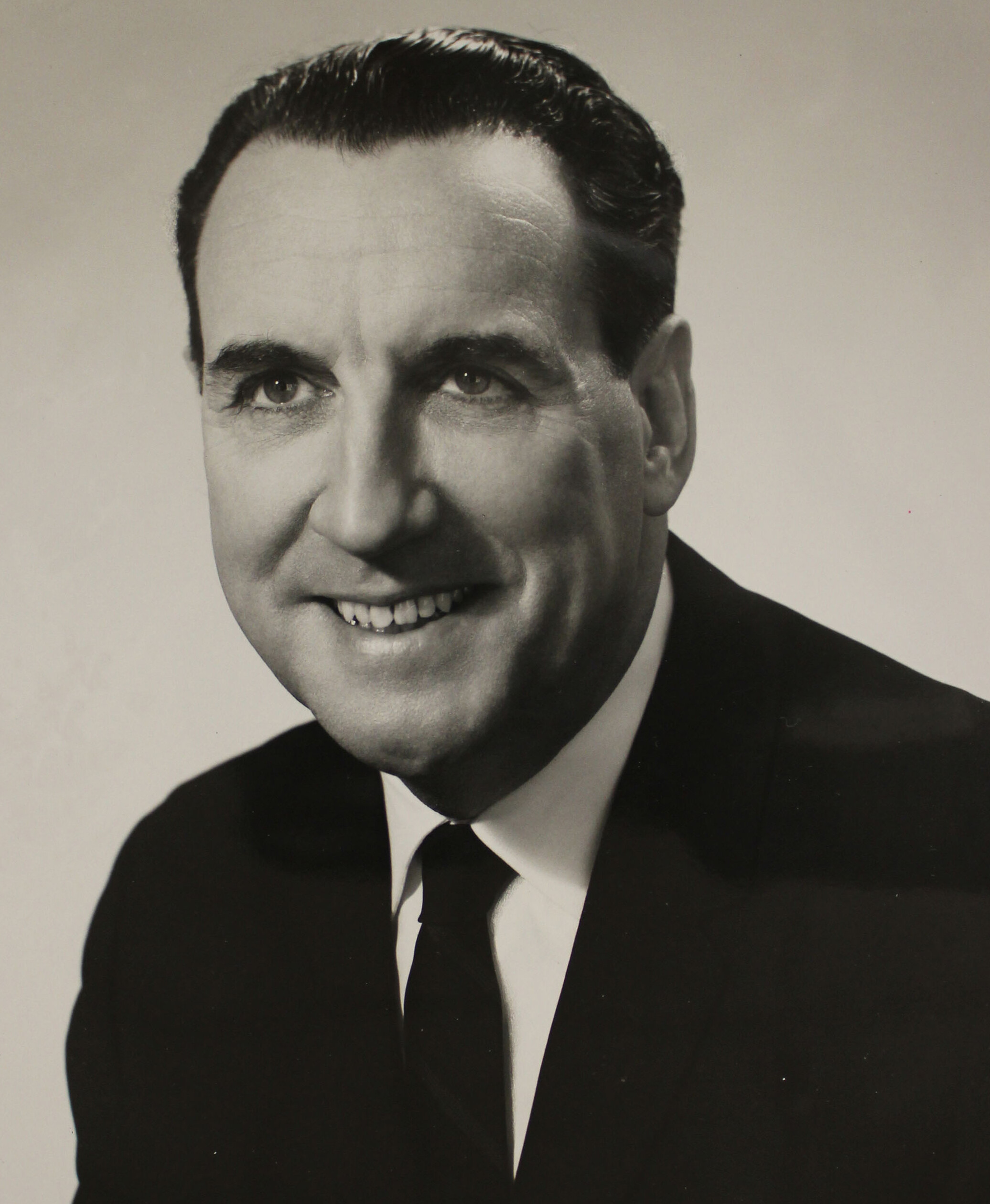

Nominee	John N. Dempsey	John deKoven Alsop
Party	Democratic	Republican
Popular vote	549,027	482,852
Percentage	53.21%	46.79%
- Dempsey: 50–60% 60–70% 70–80% Alsop: 50–60% 60–70% 70–80% 80–90%
Governor before election
John N. Dempsey
Democratic
Elected Governor
John N. Dempsey
Democratic

The 1962 Connecticut gubernatorial election was held on November 6, 1962. Incumbent Democrat John N. Dempsey defeated Republican nominee John deKoven Alsop with 53.21% of the vote.

== General election ==
=== Candidates ===
- John N. Dempsey, Democratic
- John deKoven Alsop, Republican

=== Results ===
1962 Connecticut gubernatorial election
Party	Candidate	Votes	%
Democratic	John N. Dempsey (incumbent)	549,027	53.21%
Republican	John deKoven Alsop	482,852	46.79%
Total votes		1,031,902	100.00%
Democratic hold			
