= Indian Hill Cemetery =

Cemetery in Middletown, Connecticut, US

Coordinates: 41.5557°N 72.6636°W

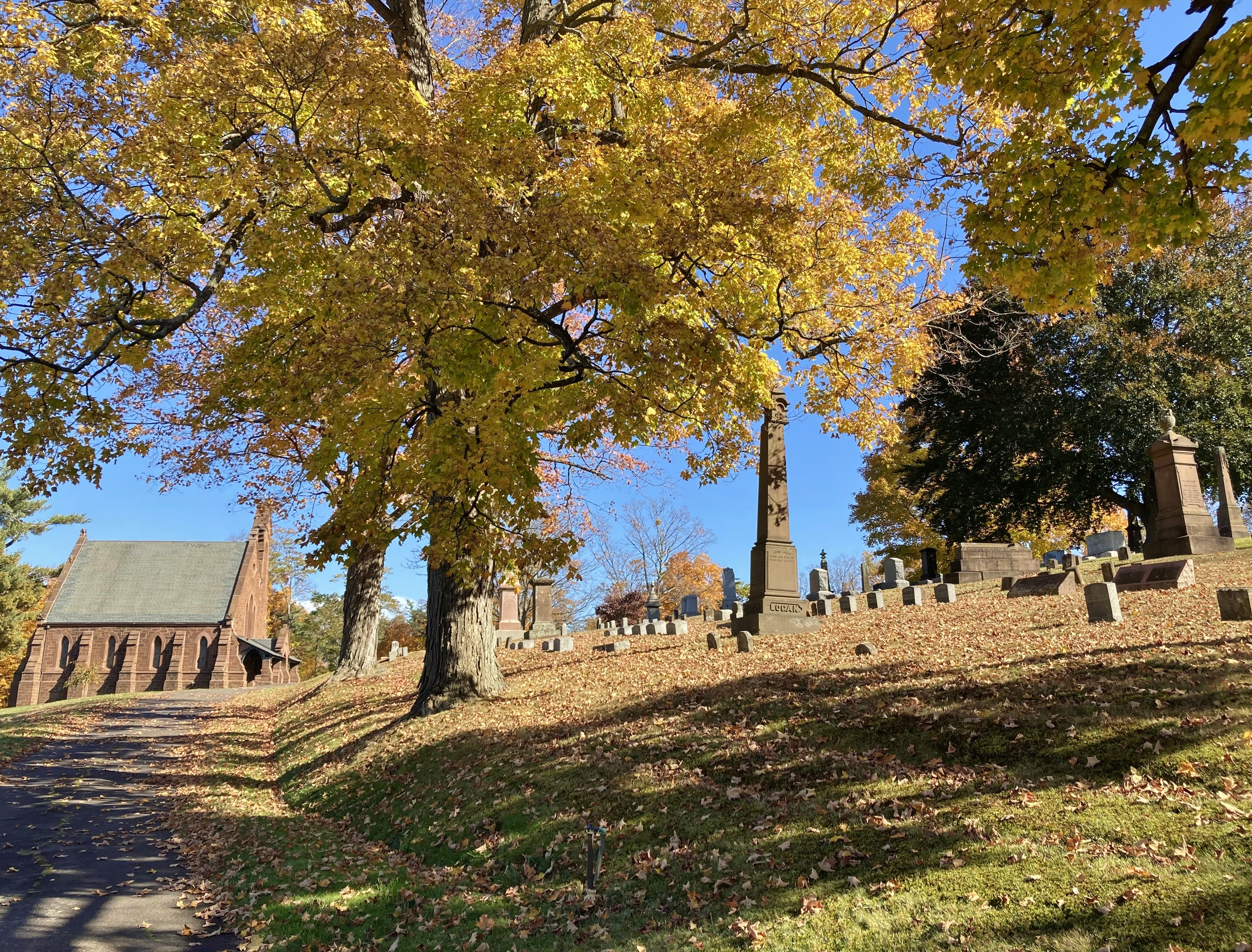

Details
- Established: 1850
- Location: 383 Washington Street, Middletown, Connecticut
- Country: United States
- Type: private
- Size: 40 acres
- No. of graves: 9,000
- Website: www.indian-hill.org
- Find a Grave: Indian Hill Cemetery

Indian Hill Cemetery is a historic rural cemetery located at 383 Washington Street in Middletown, Connecticut on a hill adjacent to Wesleyan University.

== History ==
The hill was originally named "Wunne Wah Jet" by the indigenous Wangunk people who lived in Middletown. Sowheage, a grand sachem in the tribe, built fortifications on the hill around 1639 to protect against enemy tribes and invading European settlers. Over time, the Wangunk lost much of the surrounding land to settlers by theft, but were able to keep the hill parcel for themselves. The Wangunk and settlers lived together for many decades until the hill parcel was eventually taken by settlers in the late 1700s.

The cemetery was developed, in part to change the association of Indian Hill as having been central to Wangunk life, as part of the City Beautiful movement which promoted the development of rural environments and landscapes for public spaces including cemeteries. After the yellow fever epidemic of 1841, rural cemeteries were thought to be more hygienic since they were located on the outskirts of cities.

The Indian Hill Cemetery was organized June 11, 1850, under a general act of legislation passed in 1841. The cemetery was dedicated on September 30, 1850, and became the burial site of choice for Middletown's elite.

== Russell Chapel ==
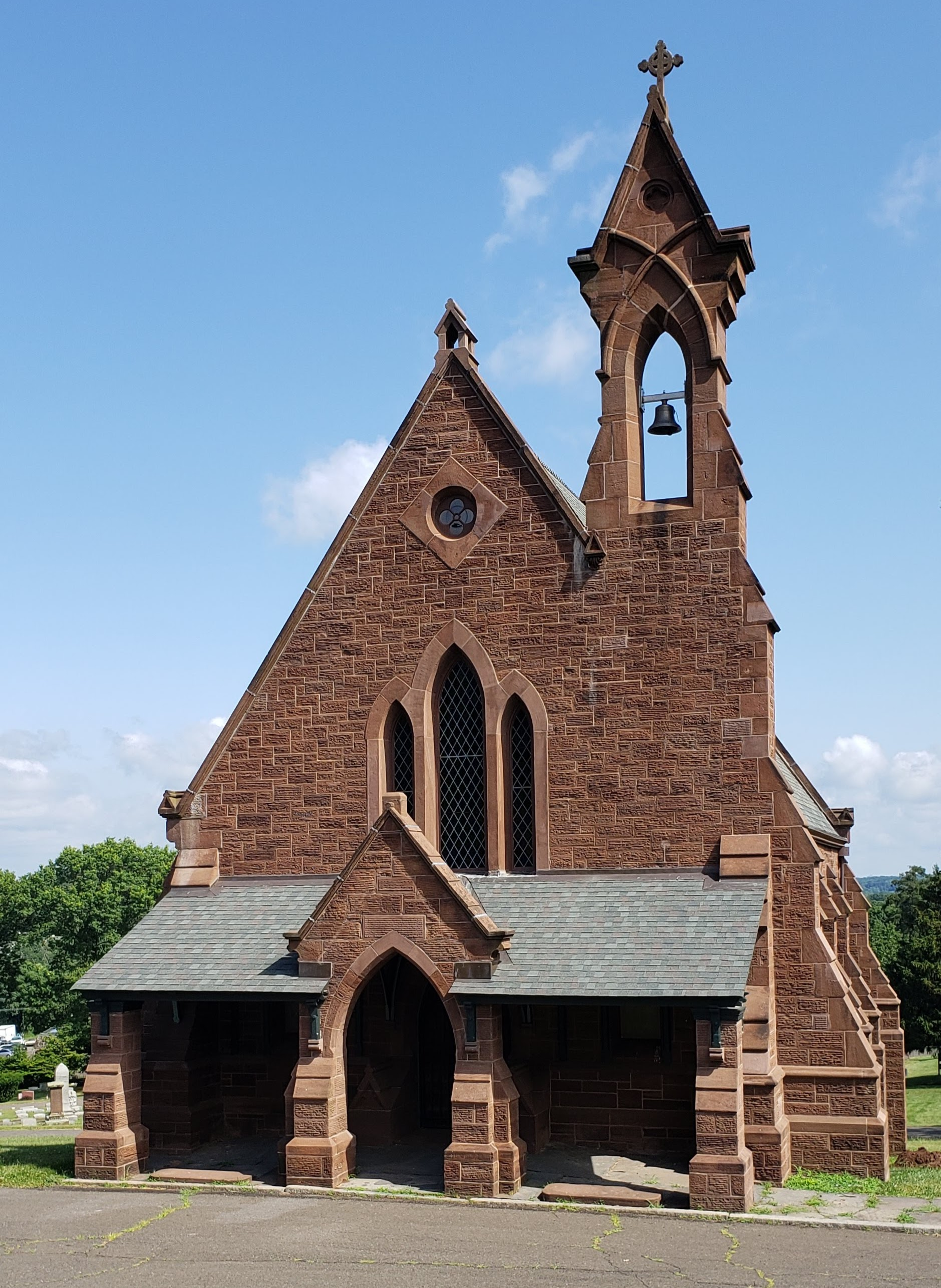
Russell Chapel

The brownstone gothic revival Russell Chapel was built in 1867. Samuel Russell was a businessman who owned the Russell & Company trading business in Canton, China. He was the first president of the Indian Hill Cemetery Association and the chapel was built by his wife in his memory.

The chapel houses the original bell forged at the Troy, New York Meneely Bell Foundry in 1868.

The chapel is listed on the Connecticut Register of Historic Places.

== Notable burials ==
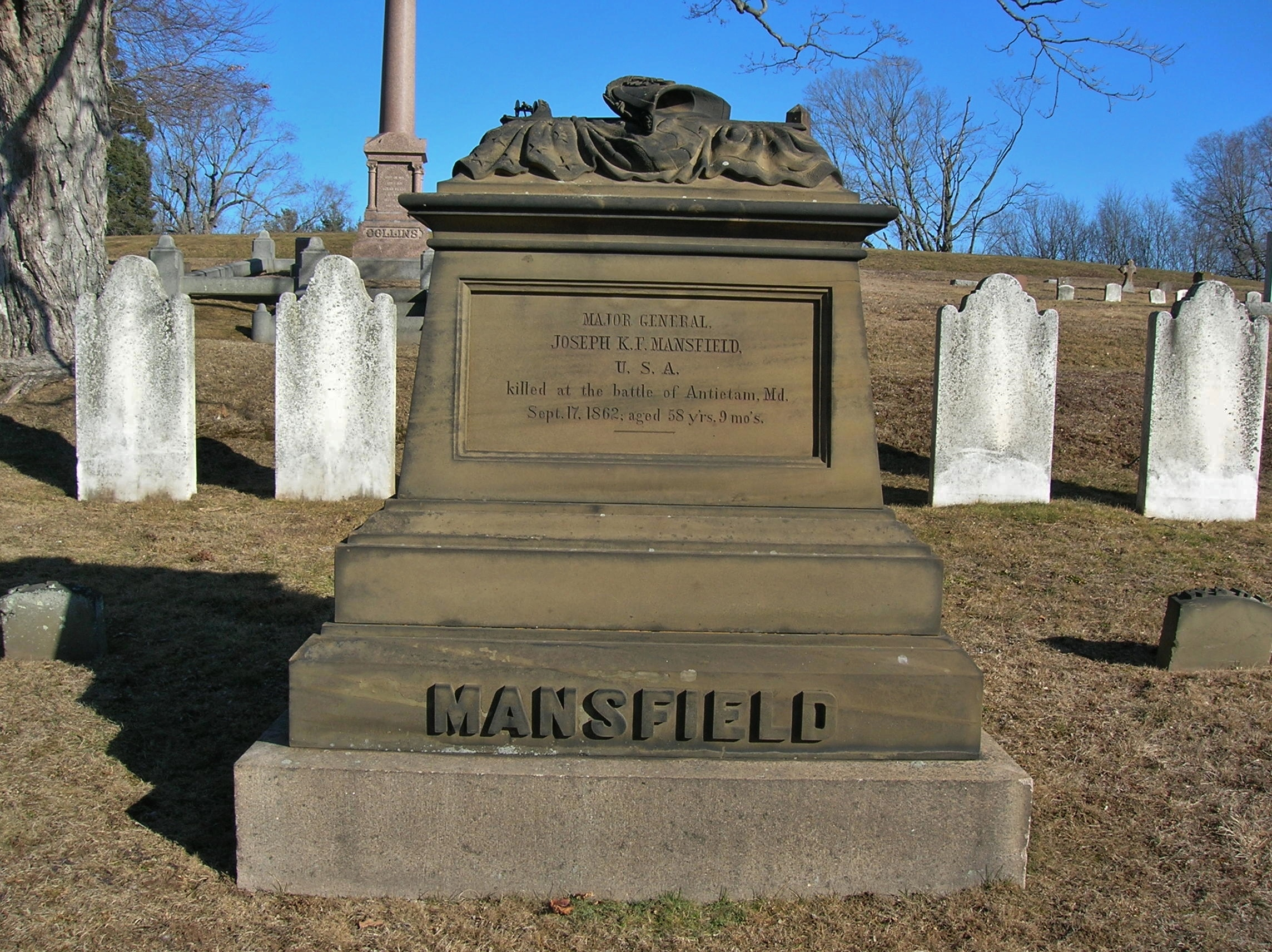
Gravestone monument for Joseph K. Mansfield

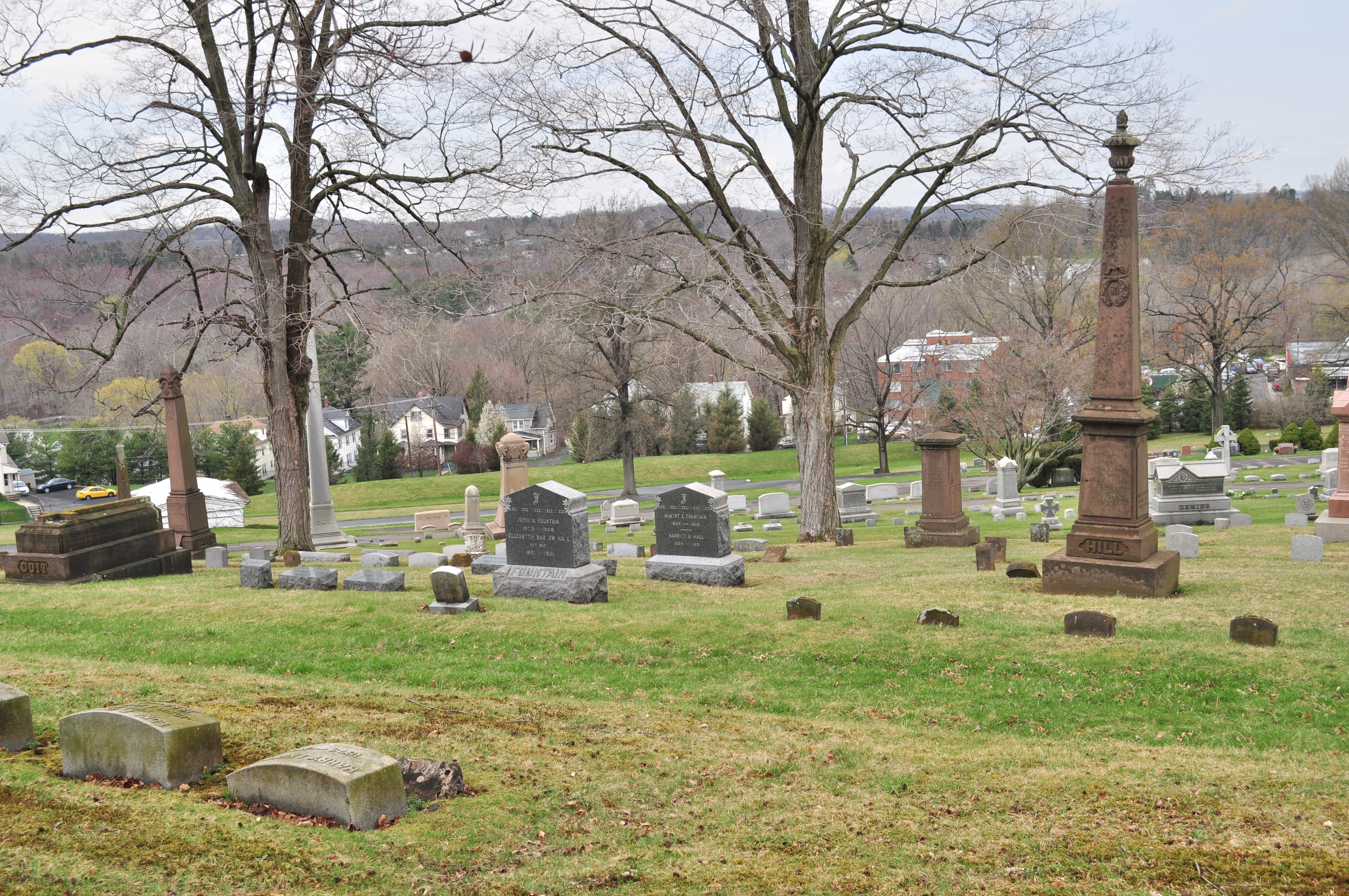
View of the surrounding neighborhood

- Joseph Wright Alsop IV (1876–1953), politician and insurance executive
- Joseph Wright Alsop V (1910–1989), journalist
- Stewart Alsop (1914–1974), newspaper columnist and political analyst
- Wilbur Olin Atwater (1844–1907), chemist known for his studies of human nutrition and metabolism
- Everett Bacon (1890–1989), college football quarterback
- Raymond E. Baldwin (1893–1986), 72nd and 74th Governor of Connecticut
- Owen Vincent Coffin (1836–1921), 56th Governor of Connecticut
- Morris B. Crawford (1852–1940), first professor of physics at Wesleyan University
- John Kenneth Galbraith (1908–2006), economist
- Samuel Dickinson Hubbard (1799–1855), U.S. Representative from Connecticut
- William Stone Hubbell (1837–1930), U.S. Civil War Medal of Honor recipient
- Ebenezer Jackson Jr. (1796–1874), U.S. Representative from Connecticut
- William Manchester (1922–2004), author, biographer and historian
- Joseph K. Mansfield (1803–1862), Union General during the U.S. Civil War
- Sigmund Neumann (1904–1962), political scientist and sociologist
- James Timothy Pratt (1802–1887), U.S. Representative from Connecticut
- William North Rice (1845–1928), geologist, Methodist minister, theologian
- Samuel L. Warner (1828–1893), U.S. Representative from Connecticut
- Frank B. Weeks (1854–1935), 64th Governor of Connecticut
