= Theodore Dwight (politician) =

American lawyer and politician

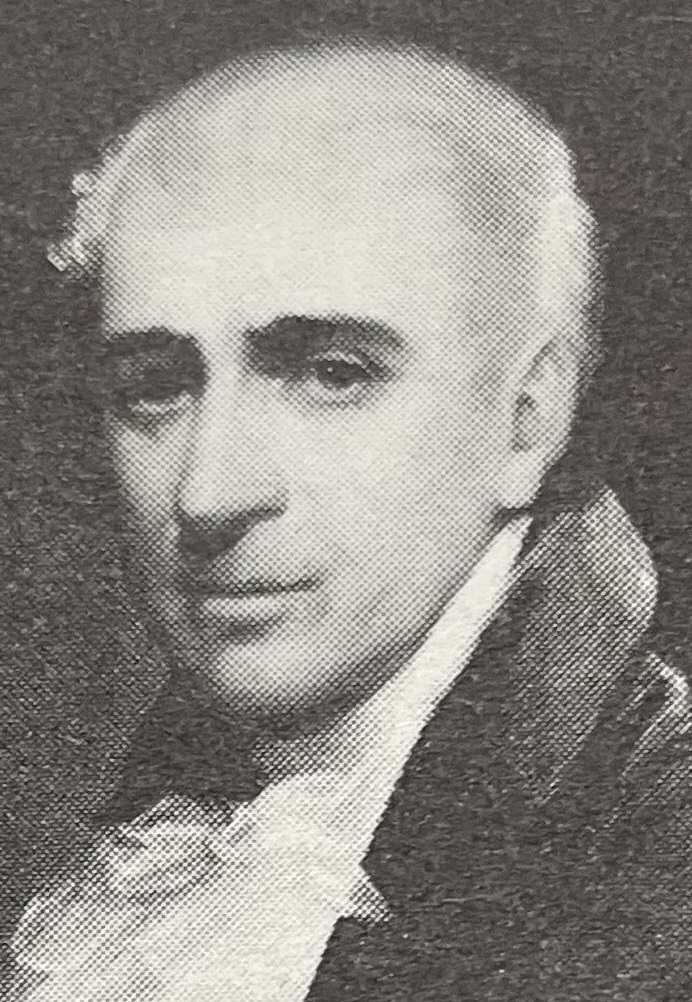
- Closeup portion of 1817 portrait by Ezra Ames

Members of the United States House of Representatives from Connecticut's at-large congressional district
- In office December 1, 1806 – March 3, 1807
- Preceded by: John Cotton Smith
- Succeeded by: Lewis B. Sturges

Personal details
- Born: December 15, 1764 Northampton, Province of Massachusetts Bay
- Died: June 12, 1846 (aged 81) New York City, New York, U.S.
- Resting place: Green-Wood Cemetery; Brooklyn, New York, U.S.
- Party: Federalist Party
- Spouse: Abigail Alsop (m. 1792)
- Relatives: Timothy Dwight (brother); Aaron Burr (cousin); Jonathan Edwards (grandfather)
- Occupation: Lawyer; journalist

Theodore Dwight (December 15, 1764 – June 12, 1846) was an American lawyer and journalist. He was a distinguished lawyer, a leader of the Federalist Party, a member of Congress from 1806 to 1807, and secretary of the Hartford Convention in 1814 and 1815.

His talent as a writer made him a brilliant editor at the Hartford Mirror, the Albany Daily Advertiser, and the New York City Daily Advertiser, which he founded in 1817. Among his publications are Life and Character of Thomas Jefferson (1839) and History of the Hartford Convention (1833).

== Biography ==
Theodore Dwight was born in Northampton, Massachusetts on December 15, 1764, a son of Timothy Dwight (1726–1777) and Mary (Edwards) Dwight. He was the brother of Timothy Dwight, the grandson of Jonathan Edwards, and a cousin of Aaron Burr.

Dwight was educated at home by his mother and attended a Northampton district school. He studied law under his uncle Pierpont Edwards, attained was admitted to the bar in 1787 and began practice in Haddam, Connecticut. He moved to Hartford in 1791, where he continued the practice of law.

He was a member of the State council from 1809 to 1815; elected as a Federalist to the Ninth Congress to fill the vacancy caused by the resignation of John Cotton Smith, he served from December 1, 1806, to March 3, 1807. He declined to be a candidate for renomination in 1806. He was secretary of the Hartford Convention in 1814–1815, moved to Albany, New York in 1815, and published the Daily Advertiser from 1815 to 1816.

He moved to New York City in 1817 and established the New York Daily Advertiser, with which he was connected until 1835's Great Fire of New York. In 1839, Dwight published The Character of Thomas Jefferson as Exhibited in His Own Writings, which argued that Jefferson's character was duplicitous and made reference to his affair with slave Sally Hemings.

He returned to Hartford and resided there until about three years before his death, when he returned to New York City, where he died on June 12, 1846, aged 81. He was interred in Green-Wood Cemetery in Brooklyn.

== Family ==
Dwight married Abigail Alsop in 1792. Their children included author Theodore Dwight (1796–1866).

U.S. House of Representatives
Preceded by John Cotton Smith	Member of the U.S. House of Representatives from Connecticut's at-large congressional district December 1, 1806 – March 3, 1807	Succeeded by Lewis B. Sturges
