= Mark Ulriksen =

American painter and magazine illustrator

- Born: 1957 (age 68–69)
- Awards: 2006 Best News Magazine Cover

Mark Ulriksen (born 1957) is an American painter and magazine illustrator.

== Education and early professional life ==
After studying at California State University, Chico and University of Massachusetts, Amherst, Ulriksen's first major position was as art director of San Francisco Magazine (formerly San Francisco Focus magazine) from 1986 until 1993, when he began to devote all his time and attention to painting and illustrating. His art pieces have made appearances in New York, Los Angeles, San Francisco, Paris, and Rome, and some of his pieces permanently reside at the Smithsonian Institution, the Library of Congress, and the Museum of Contemporary Art of Rome.

== Relationship with The New Yorker magazine ==
Ulriksen's first significant illustration assignments came in 1993 from The New Yorker, at the time under the helm of editor Tina Brown, a relationship that has continued to this day. His contributions made history for the magazine with the first cover illustrating the content of the issue (the White House under then-President Clinton, which was also the first issue to include, in the article, further small pictures illustrating the content of the article). Since then he has been a regular contributor to the magazine, and has been responsible for numerous cover images. In addition, he has (on multiple occasions) been paired with the noted baseball writer Roger Angell to illustrate The New Yorker's annual baseball season wrap.

== Other work ==
Ulriksen has also contributed to Rolling Stone Magazine, Vibe Magazine, GQ Magazine, Entertainment Weekly, Time Magazine, and Newsweek, and his work features in the permanent collection of The Smithsonian, the Library of Congress and the Galleria Nazionale d'Arte Moderna (the Museum of Contemporary Art), Rome. Ulriksen has also illustrated two children's books The Biggest Parade (Henry Holt, 2006) and Dog Show (Henry Holt, 2006) by author Elizabeth Winthrop. He is the artist for the SFJAZZ Center. In 2014, he published the book " Dogs Rule Nonchalantly."

== Artistic style ==
Ulriksen's style incorporates his loves of dogs and baseball, as well as drawing on his family and friends (in a manner akin to Norman Rockwell) to serve as anonymous subjects for his illustrations. It is a style that is expressionistic, quirky, angular, and painterly, with exaggerated features (usually very small hands and feet), but which captures the essence of his subjects dead-on with sweetness, light humor, and joy.

== Awards won ==
Watch Your Back Mountain

Ulriksen's cover for the February 27, 2006 edition of The New Yorker won the 2006 American Society of Magazine Editors award for Best News Magazine Cover. The cover, titled Watch Your Back Mountain was prompted by the hunting incident earlier in the month when Vice President Dick Cheney accidentally shot and injured Harry Whittington. The cover depicts Cheney and President George W. Bush dressed as cowboys, with Cheney holding a smoking shotgun and Bush lurking behind him, in homage to the 2005 film Brokeback Mountain. The ASME, in announcing the award, said that the image "evokes both the smugness of a vice president implicated in catastrophe and the cluelessness of a president incapable of stopping him".

Ulriksen is the recipient of Gold and Silver medals from the Society of Illustrators.

== Personal life ==
A lifelong fan of baseball (in particular The Giants and The Boston Red Sox), Ulriksen is married to the photographer Leslie Flores. They live in Cole Valley, San Francisco with their two daughters and their chocolate Labrador Retriever, Ivy.

== Bibliography ==
- Dogs rule nonchalantly. 2014.
