= Theodore Dwight (author) =

American author (1796–1866)

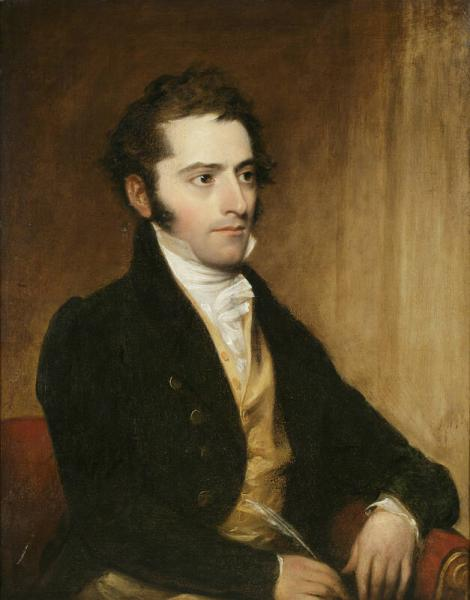
- Born: March 3, 1796; Hartford, Connecticut, U.S.
- Died: October 16, 1866 (aged 70); Brooklyn, New York, U.S.
- Education: Yale College
- Occupation: Writer
- Spouse: Eleanor Boyd (m. 1827)
- Children: 7
- Father: Theodore Dwight
- Relatives: Richard Alsop (uncle); Timothy Dwight IV (uncle)

Theodore Dwight (1796–1866), was an American author.

== Life ==
Theodore Dwight was born on March 3, 1796, in Hartford, Connecticut. His father was Theodore Dwight (1764–1846) of the New England Dwight family. His mother was Abigail Alsop (1765–1846), the sister of Richard Alsop (1761–1815). He graduated from Yale College in 1814.

He compiled the travelogues of his uncle, Timothy Dwight IV, previously president of Yale, which he brought to publication in 1821. In 1825, he published the second tourist guidebook in the United States, The Northern Traveller, which he updated with regular editions until 1841. A commentator on American society, he wrote a number of works on child rearing and school reform and, in the 1850s and 1860s, passionately advocated for the cause of Garibaldi and the unification of Italy.

He married Eleanor Boyd on April 24, 1827. Their children were:

1. Maria Bayard Dwight (February 17, 1828 - February 11, 1852)
2. Ellen Boyd Dwight (born September 16, 1830), married Captain Charles C. H. Kennedy, who served in the Confederate Navy during the American Civil War
3. Theodore Dwight III (March 4, 1833 - December 18, 1852)
4. Mary Alsop Dwight (born March 17, 1836)
5. Anna Maria Dwight (born November 18, 1837), ran a girls' school with sister Mary
6. Augusta Moore Dwight (born November 18, 1840), married Sherwood Bissel Ferris
7. Rebecca Jaffray Dwight (born March 1, 1842), married Fenton Rockwell and had one child Benjamin Fenton Rockwell on December 17, 1868

He died on October 16, 1866, in Brooklyn, New York, from injuries in a train accident while traveling to Newark, New Jersey. After accompanying his daughter and two grandchildren, he had jumped off the train as it left the station.

== Publications ==
- A Journal of a Tour in Italy in the Year 1821 with a Description of Gibraltar (1821)
- The Northern Traveller (1825; sixth edition, 1841)
- First Lessons in Modern Greek (1833)
- The Roman Republic of 1849 (1851)
- History of Connecticut (1841)
- The Kansas War: or, the Exploits of Chivalry in the Nineteenth Century (1859)
- Dwight's American Penny Magazine, and Family Newspaper, later Dwight's American Magazine, and Family Newspaper, weekly, from February 8, 1845, to at least vol. 3, no. 52, December 25, 1847.
