= The Castle in the Attic =

Children's fantasy novel by Elizabeth Winthrop

- First edition cover
- Author: Elizabeth Winthrop
- Illustrator: Trina Schart Hyman
- Cover artist: Trina Schart Hyman
- Language: English
- Subject: Fantasy
- Genre: Children's Books
- Publisher: Holiday House
- Publication date: August 1985
- Publication place: United States
- Pages: 137
- ISBN: 0-8234-0579-6
- OCLC: 11867383
- Followed by: The Battle for the Castle

The Castle in the Attic is a children's fantasy novel by Elizabeth Winthrop and illustrator Trina Schart Hyman, first published in 1985. The novel has won the Dorothy Canfield Fisher Children's Book Award and the California Young Reader Medal. It has also been nominated for twenty-three state book awards.

== Plot summary ==
William is given a realistic model of a castle by his family's English housekeeper, Mrs. Phillips, who tells him that it has been in her family for many many years and that its toy silver knight (made of lead) is said to be under a spell. The knight, Sir Simon, comes to life and tells William stories about olden times and an evil wizard who is ruling his kingdom. Desperate to stop Mrs. Phillips from going away, William has Sir Simon shrink her with a magic token he stole from the wizard, Alastor. However, William and Sir Simon lack the ability to return Mrs. Phillips to her true size as the half of the token that can do so is with Alastor, and Mrs. Phillips falls into a depression. Learning of a legend that states that when there is a lady, a knight, and a squire, a quest can be undertaken to stop Alastor, William decides to become a squire to undo his mistake. As he will be shrunk willingly, he will return to his world at the exact moment he left, but Mrs. Phillips will lose all the time she spent in the castle until William enters. William has Sir Simon shrink him and he enters the castle to join his two friends.

Mrs. Phillips and Sir Simon spend a week training him before Sir Simon and William leave, exiting the castle in Sir Simon's time. While traveling through a magical forest, Sir Simon is tempted by the apparition of his old horse Moonlight, leaves the path and disappears, after having warned William that doing just that will cause one to get lost forever. William manages to make it through the forest on his own and encounters an old man at an apple tree. After getting a specific apple for him, the old man reverts into a young man and reveals he was under a spell. In gratitude for William's actions, the man, Dick, reveals how to defeat the dragon guarding Alastor's castle. William defeats the dragon and uses the pretext of a fool seeking work to enter the castle, with the guards hiding the secret that he defeated the dragon to enter. Alastor accepts him as his fool and reveals to William's horror that he has defeated Sir Simon again and turned him to lead, keeping him in a gallery with his other victims. However, he also turned to lead Dick's son, a young boy named Tolliver William encountered, and thus believes he has defeated the threat from the legend, not knowing it's really William.

William learns from Sir Simon's old nurse, Calendar, that he needs to get Alastor's necklace with his tokens on it and defeat his mirror that reflects what's inside of you. When Alastor shows up, William knocks him down with his gymnastic abilities, gets the necklace, and faces his own fears in the mirror. He then turns it on Alastor, who cowers from it. Calendar uses the lead token to turn Alastor into lead and send him away, defeating him and breaking all of his spells but the lead spell. William is hailed as a hero and the new ruler of the kingdom, but he instead revives Sir Simon and the rest of the lead victims so that Sir Simon can regain his rightful place as ruler. William returns to the castle in the attic with the other half of the token and he and Mrs. Phillips return to their right sizes. She leaves, taking with her the token and Alastor who was sent to the castle, planning to drop both into the ocean.

== Educational uses ==
Jennifer Hadlock writing for Teacher Link said "This book can be used effectively to teach a unit on the Middle Ages. It is a great book for teaching about the architecture of the time period with its descriptions of castles and the surrounding territory. The issue of how an effective ruler should govern the country, as well as the rules which govern society, can be taught. The book also has an underlying theme of overcoming fears so this would also be good to address".

Carol Otis Hurst writing for Teaching K-8 Magazine said, "The fantasy must be grounded in reality in order for us to "get into it". Sometimes the author accomplishes this with attention to detail, sometimes by showing us the real world that surrounds the magic, sometimes by giving us very believable characters. Which techniques did Elizabeth Winthrop use? When, if ever, did she stretch your credulity too far?"
