= Timothy Dwight IV =

American historian (1752–1817)

The Reverend Timothy Dwight IV
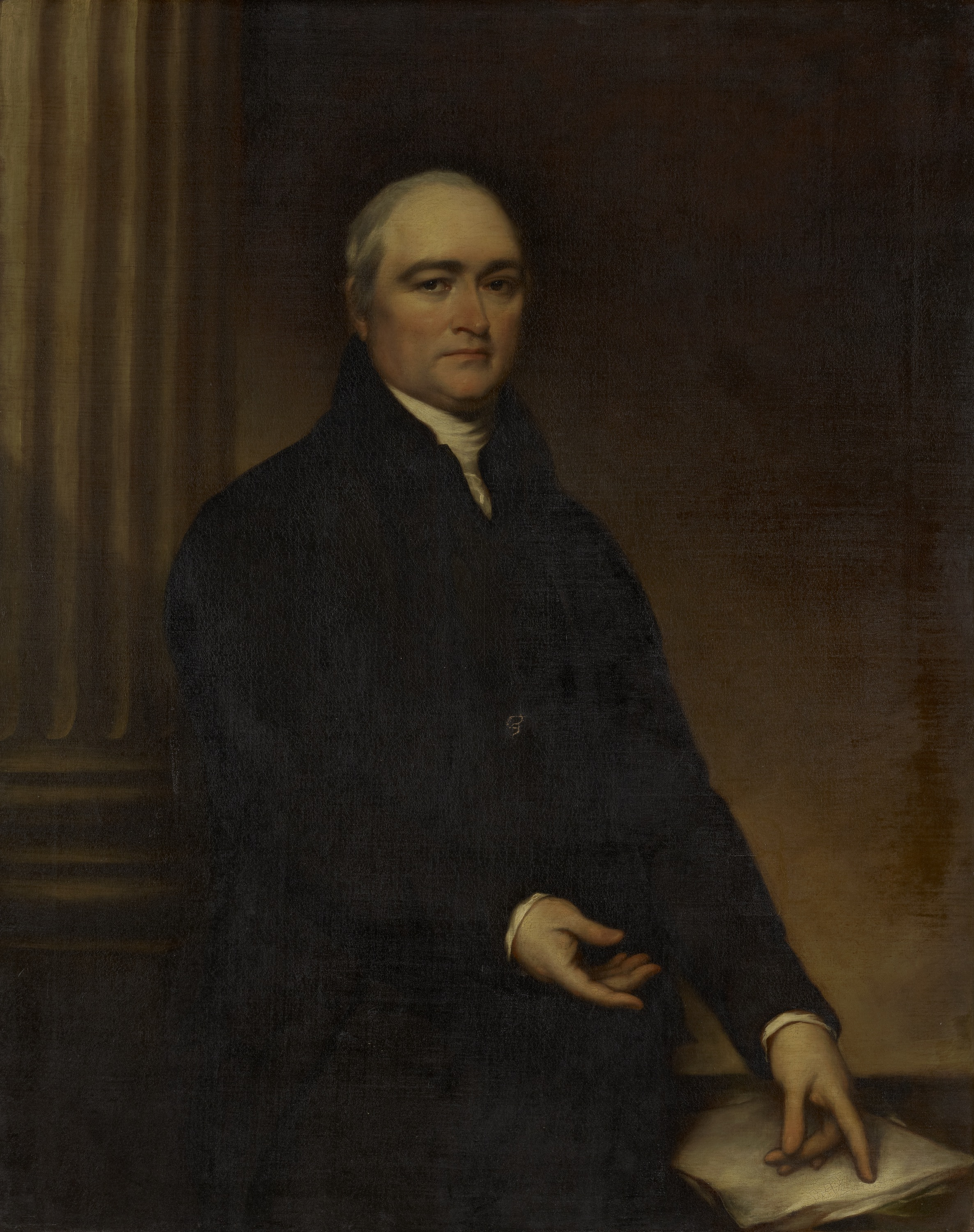
- Portrait by John Trumbull, 1817

8th President of Yale University
- In office 1795–1817
- Preceded by: Ezra Stiles
- Succeeded by: Jeremiah Day

Personal details
- Born: May 14, 1752 Northampton, Province of Massachusetts Bay
- Died: January 11, 1817 (aged 64) Philadelphia, Pennsylvania, U.S.
- Resting place: Grove Street Cemetery; New Haven, Connecticut, U.S.
- Spouse: Mary Woolsey
- Children: 8, including Sereno and William
- Relatives: Theodore (brother); Theodore Dwight Woolsey (nephew); Theodore Dwight (nephew); Timothy Dwight V (grandson)
- Education: Yale College

Timothy Dwight (May 14, 1752 – January 11, 1817) was an American academic and educator, a Congregationalist minister, theologian, and author. He was the eighth president of Yale College (1795–1817).

== Early life ==
Timothy Dwight was born May 14, 1752, in Northampton, Massachusetts. The Dwight family had a long association with Yale College, as it was then known. Dwight's paternal grandfather, Colonel Timothy Dwight, was born on 19 October 1694 and died on April 30, 1771. His father, a merchant and farmer known as Major Timothy Dwight, was born May 27, 1726, graduated from Yale in 1744, served in the American Revolutionary War, and died June 10, 1777. His mother Mary Edwards (1734–1807) was the third daughter of theologian Jonathan Edwards. Dwight was said to have learned the alphabet at a single lesson and to have been able to read the Bible before he was four years old. He had 12 younger siblings, including journalist Theodore Dwight (1764–1846).

Dwight graduated from Yale in 1769 (when he was only 17 years old). For two years, he was rector of the Hopkins Grammar School in New Haven, Connecticut. Dwight was a tutor at Yale College from 1771 to 1777. Licensed to preach in 1777, he was appointed by Congress chaplain in General Samuel Holden Parsons's Connecticut Continental Brigade. Dwight served with distinction, inspiring the troops with his sermons and the stirring war songs he composed, the most famous of which is "Columbia".

On March 3, 1777, Dwight married Mary Woolsey (1754–1854), the daughter of New York merchant and banker Benjamin Woolsey (1720–1771). This marriage connected him to some of New York's wealthiest and most influential families. Woolsey had been Dwight's father's Yale classmate, roommate, and intimate friend.

On news of his father's death in the fall of 1778, Dwight resigned his commission and returned to take charge of his family in Northampton. Besides managing the family's farms, he preached and taught, establishing a school for both sexes. During this period, he served two terms in the Massachusetts legislature.

== Career ==
Dwight first came to public attention with his Yale College 1772 commencement address when he received his M.A. degree and later his "Valedictory Address" of 1776, in which he described Americans as having a unique national identity as a new "people, who have the same religion, the same manners, the same interests, the same language, and the same essential forms and principles of civic government."

Declining calls from churches in Beverly and Charlestown, Dwight chose instead to settle from 1783 until 1795 as minister in "Greenfield Hill," a congregational church in Fairfield, Connecticut. There he established an academy, which at once acquired a high reputation and attracted pupils from all parts of the Union, including Elihu Hubbard Smith. Dwight was an innovative and inspiring teacher, preferring moral suasion over the corporal punishment favored by most schoolmasters of the day.

In 1788, Dwight purchased a slave, a woman named Naomi. He stated that his intention was for her to 'purchase' her freedom for an unspecified number of years of faithful servitude. It is unknown whether she was successful in obtaining her freedom. It is also unknown whether Dwight held her in slavery while serving as the President of Yale.

In 1793, Dwight preached a sermon to the General Association of Connecticut entitled a "Discourse on the Genuineness and Authenticity of the New Testament" which when printed the next year became an important tract defending the orthodox faith against Deists and other skeptics.

=== Presidency of Yale College (1795–1817) ===
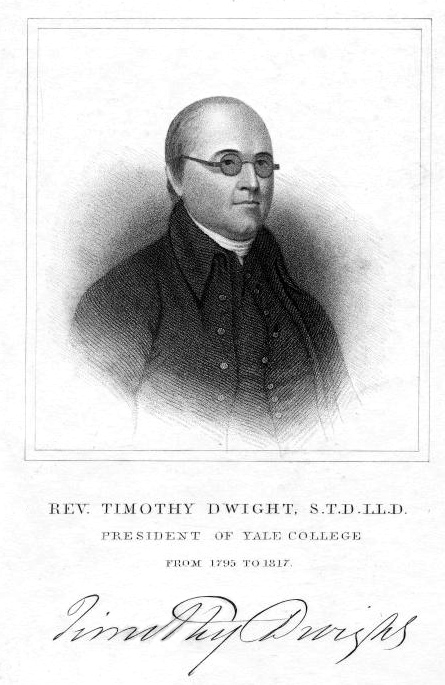
Engraving of Dwight and his signature, c. 1820 to 1840

Dwight was the leader of the evangelical New Divinity faction of Congregationalism, a group closely identified with Connecticut's emerging commercial elite. Although fiercely opposed by religious moderates, most notably Yale President Ezra Stiles, he was elected to the presidency of Yale on Stiles's death in 1795. Shortly afterwards, Dwight was elected an honorary member of the Connecticut Society of the Cincinnati. His ability as a teacher and his talents as a religious and political leader soon made the college the largest institution of higher education in North America. Dwight had a genius for recognizing able protégé such as James Murdock, Lyman Beecher, Nathaniel W. Taylor, and Leonard Bacon, all of whom would become major religious leaders and theological innovators in the antebellum decades.

During troubled times at Yale College, President Timothy Dwight saw his students drawn to the radical republicanism and "infidel philosophy" of the French Revolution, including the philosophies of Hume, Hobbes, Tindal, and Lords Shaftesbury and Bolingbroke. Between 1797 and 1800, Dwight frequently warned audiences against the threats of this "infidel philosophy" in America. An address to the candidates for the baccalaureate in Yale College called "The Nature and Danger of Infidel Philosophy, Exhibited in Two Discourses, Addressed to the Candidates for the Baccalaureate, In Yale College" was delivered on September 9, 1797. It was published by George Bunce in 1798. This book is credited as one of the embers of the Second Great Awakening.

Dr. Dwight has made a contribution to science though he was not trained in any particular field. Yale's faculty, still small and theological at the end of its first century, significantly transformed when Dwight hired three new professors between 1801 and 1803: Jeremiah Day, professor of mathematics; James Luce Kingsley, professor of classical languages; and Benjamin Silliman, professor of chemistry and geology. Silliman, Yale's first chemist, who introduced science education at Yale, became the patriarch of American science. Day, a minister as well as a mathematician, succeeded Dwight as Yale College president upon his death.

=== Religious leadership ===
Dwight was as notable for his political leadership as for his religious and educational eminence. Known by his enemies as "Pope" Dwight, he wielded both the temporal sword (as head of Connecticut's Federalist Party), and spiritual sword (as nominal head of the state's Congregational Church). He led the effort to prevent the disestablishment of the church in Connecticut—and, when its disestablishment appeared inevitable, encouraged efforts by protégés like Beecher and Bacon to organize voluntary associations to maintain the influence of religion in public life. Fearing that the failure of states to establish schools and the rise of infidelity would bring about the destruction of republican institutions, Dwight helped to create a national evangelical movement—the second "Great Awakening"—intended to "re-church" America.

In 1809, Dwight was introduced to the Hawaiian-born Henry ʻŌpūkahaʻia by his relative Edwin W. Dwight, a student at Yale. ʻŌpūkahaʻia, a 17-year-old boy orphaned at the age of 10, had arrived in New Haven after being given passage from Hawaii by New Haven resident Captain Caleb Britnell. Dwight agreed to tutor ʻŌpūkahaʻia, who later became instrumental in establishing Christian missions to Hawaii. In 1810, Dwight became a founder of the American Board of Commissioners for Foreign Missions, which launched its first mission to Hawaii in 1819 under Hiram Bingham.

=== Scholarly accomplishments ===
Dwight was a founder of the Connecticut Academy of Arts and Sciences and Andover Theological Seminary. He was elected a Fellow of the American Academy of Arts and Sciences in 1797, and was also an early member of the American Antiquarian Society, elected in 1813. He received honorary degrees from the College of New Jersey in 1787 and Harvard College in 1810.

Dwight was well-known as an author, preacher, and theologian. He and his brother, Theodore, were members of a group of writers centered around Yale known as the "Hartford Wits" In verse, Dwight wrote an ambitious epic in eleven books, The Conquest of Canaan, finished in 1774 but not published until 1785, a somewhat ponderous and solemn satire, The Triumph of Infidelity (1788), directed against David Hume, Voltaire and others; Greenfield Hill (1794), the suggestion for which seems to have been derived from John Denham's Coopers Hill; and a number of minor poems and hymns, the best known of which is that beginning "I love thy kingdom, Lord". Many of Dwight's sermons were published posthumously under the titles Theology Explained and Defended (5 vols., 1818–1819), to which a memoir of the author by two of his sons, W. T. and Sereno E. Dwight, is prefixed, and Sermons by Timothy Dwight (2 vols., 1828), which had a large circulation both in the United States and in England. Probably his most important work, published posthumously, is his Travels in New England and New York (4 vols., 1821–1822). The work contains much material of value concerning social and economic New England and New York during the period 1796–1817. The term "Cape Cod House" makes its first appearance in this work. The work also contains the correspondence between Dwight and the theologian Gideon Hawley, following Dwight's visit to the elder preacher who was a very close friend of Dwight's parents.

=== Personal life ===
Dwight married Mary Woolsey. They had eight sons: Timothy Dwight (1778–1844), a New Haven merchant and philanthropist; Benjamin Woolsey Dwight (1780–1850), a New York physician; educator and theologian; twins James Dwight (1784–1863) and John Dwight (1784–1803); Sereno Edwards Dwight (1786–1850), who served as the third president of Hamilton College; clergyman William Theodore Dwight (1795–1865); Henry Edwin Dwight (1797–1832), an educator and author; and one who died young. Dwight's grandson and namesake, Timothy Dwight the Younger (1828–1916), served as Yale's president from 1886 to 1899. His nephew, Theodore Dwight Woolsey (1801–1889), served as Yale's president between 1846 and 1871. Another nephew was Theodore Dwight (1796–1866), an author and journalist.

Dwight died of colorectal cancer in 1817 and was buried in New Haven's Grove Street Cemetery. Mary Woolsey Dwight died on October 5, 1845.

== Legacy ==
Dwight's 1785 poem The Conquest of Canaan is considered to be the first American epic poem.

Greenfield Hill's Timothy Dwight Elementary School is named after him in Fairfield, Connecticut, as well as Timothy Dwight Park.

In the twentieth century, Yale named Timothy Dwight College for him and his grandson.

In New York City, University Heights, Bronx, has PS 33, Timothy Dwight school.

Dwight Presbyterian Mission, established near present-day Russellville, Arkansas in 1820 and moved near Marble City, Oklahoma in 1829, was a residential school for Cherokee students named for Timothy Dwight. It remained in operation in Oklahoma until 1948.

In 2008, The Library of America selected Dwight's account of the murders of Connecticut shopkeeper William Beadle for inclusion in its two-century retrospective of American True Crime.

== Notes ==
Academic offices
Preceded by Ezra Stiles	President of Yale College; 1795–1817	Succeeded by Jeremiah Day
