= John Alsop =

American politician (1724–1794)

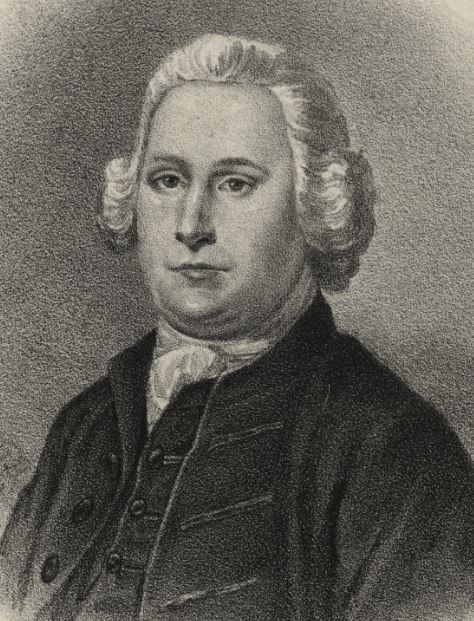
- Alsop from a sketch by Max Rosenthal

Member of the 2nd Continental Congress from New York
- In office May 10, 1775 – March 1, 1781

Member of the 1st Continental Congress from New York
- In office September 14, 1774 – October 26, 1774

Personal details
- Born: 1724 New Windsor, Province of New York, British America
- Died: November 22, 1794 (aged 69–70) Newtown, Queens County, New York, U.S.
- Resting place: Trinity Church Cemetery
- Spouse: Mary Frogat (m. 1766; died 1772)
- Children: 1
- Relatives: Rufus King (son-in-law); John Alsop King (grandson); Charles King (grandson); James Gore King (grandson); Edward King (grandson); Richard Alsop (nephew)
- Profession: Politician, merchant

John Alsop Jr. (1724 – November 22, 1794) was an American merchant and politician from New York City. As a delegate for New York to the Continental Congress from 1774 to 1776, he signed the 1774 Continental Association.

== Early life ==
Coat of Arms of John Alsop

Alsop was born in 1724 in New Windsor, Orange County, in the British Province of New York. He was the son of John Alsop, Sr. and Abigail Sackett. His father was a lawyer in New Windsor and later New York City, where he was largely interested in real estate. His parents married in 1718 and were the parents of four children, including his younger brother, Richard Alsop.

His paternal grandparents were Captain Richard Alsop and Hannah Underhill (1666–1757), who first settled in New York during the 1650s and served as a major in Oliver Cromwell's army, but after a disagreement with the Lord Protector, he fled to the obscurity of colonial life. His great-grandparents were Captain John Underhill and Elizabeth Feake, who was the daughter of Robert Feake and Elizabeth Fones, a descendant of Governor John Winthrop of the Massachusetts Bay Colony. His maternal grandparents were Captain Joseph Sackett and Elizabeth Betts.

== Career ==
As a young man he moved to New York City, where he entered the mercantile world with his brother Richard. The brothers became importers and merchants in cloth and dry goods. Their enterprise prospered, and the Alsops, for several generations, became one of the great merchant houses of the city. John became interested in civic and political activities. He was elected by New York County to serve in the Province of New York Assembly. He was one of the civic leaders that incorporated the New York Hospital Association and served as its first governor from 1770 to 1784. In 1757, his brother Richard retired from business and removed to Middletown, Connecticut.

=== American Revolution ===
During the first phases of the American Revolution, the Province of New York Assembly could not reach a conclusion about the Continental Congress. As a result, delegates were selected by the revolutionary committees in each county. In 1774, Alsop, along with James Duane, John Jay, Philip Livingston, and Isaac Low, was named as a delegate. When the Congress convened on September 5, Jay presented their credentials, and the Congress accepted. Alsop arrived in Philadelphia on September 14.

As the revolution escalated in 1775, Alsop was one of the leaders of the Committee of Sixty which became the provisional government in New York City. He actively supported the non-importation agreements that he had signed the previous October in the Congress, despite the costs to his business. He was active in recruiting militia and in efforts to equip and arm them. As the Assembly continued to refuse to recognize the national Congress, he was elected to the alternative revolutionary New York Provincial Congress, and they in turn returned him to the Second Continental Congress. Alsop favored reconciliation with Great Britain and so resigned as a delegate to the Congress rather than sign the Declaration of Independence.

1776 was a critical year in the struggle for New York. Alsop began the year at Philadelphia, in a session of Congress. He made several trips between there and New York, acting as an agent of Congress through his business to acquire supplies, and particularly powder for the Continental Army. After General Washington visited Congress in late May, Alsop returned with him to New York in early June. He added efforts to find housing for 8,000 Continental Army troops to his earlier and continuing work on the supply problems. When his home in Newtown was captured by the British in August, he kept working from Manhattan. By September the British had occupied Manhattan as well, ending his effective contributions to the revolution. He escaped to Middletown, Connecticut, and remained there until the British occupation ended in 1783.

=== Later years ===
After the war he worked to help rebuild the family business and again became active as a civic leader. He was president of New York City's Chamber of Commerce in 1784 and 1785.

== Personal life ==
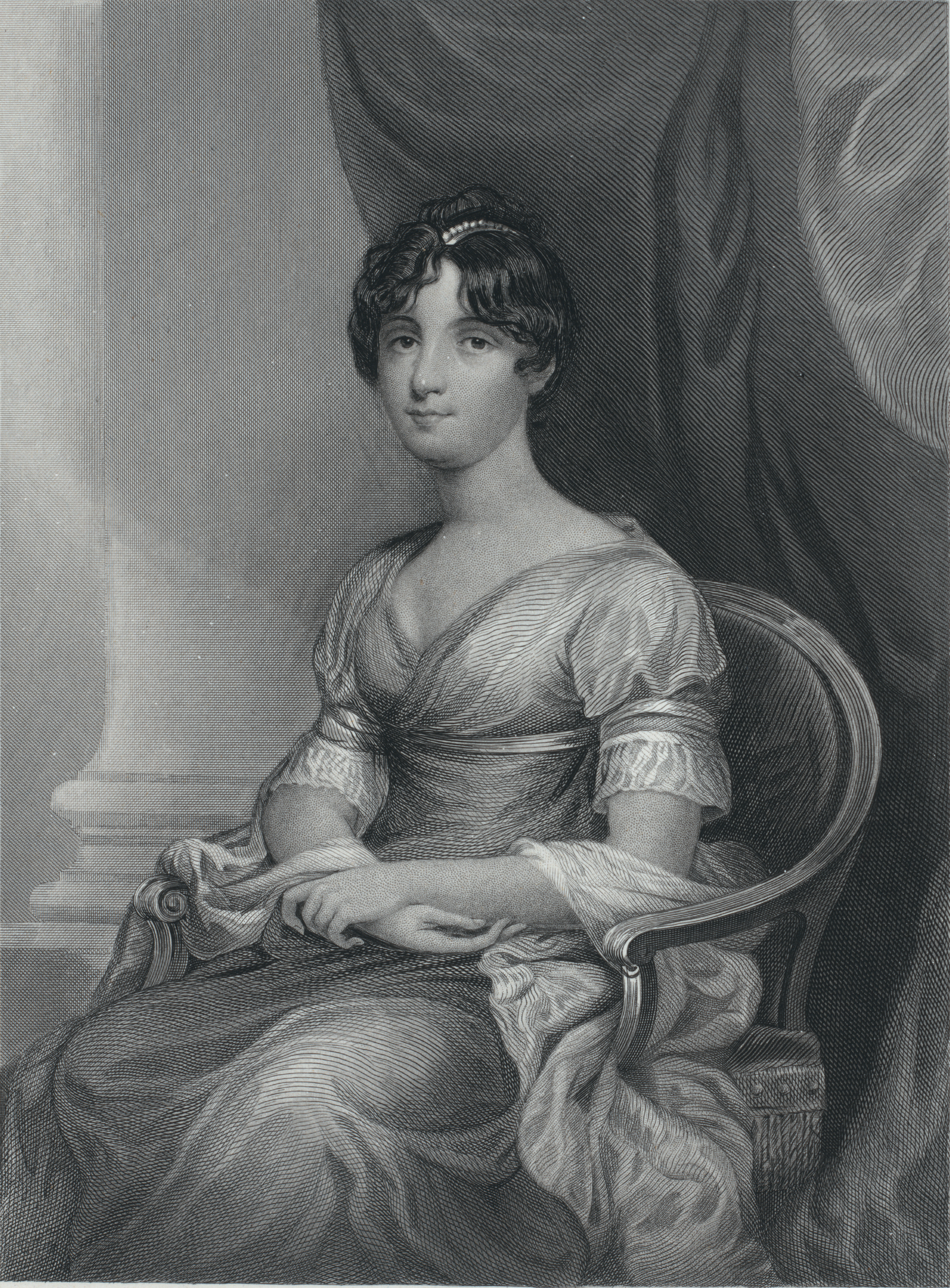
Alsop's daughter, Mary Alsop who married Rufus King

On June 6, 1766, he married Mary Frogat (1744–1772) in New York City. They were the parents of one daughter, Mary Alsop (1769–1819), who married Rufus King (1755–1827).

Alsop died at his home in Newtown, Queens County, New York, on November 22, 1794, and is buried in Trinity Church Cemetery in Manhattan. His considerable fortune was passed to his daughter and son-in-law after his death.

=== Descendants ===
His nephew, Richard Alsop (1761–1815), was an author who wrote the National and Civil History of Chili, in two volumes, and was one of The Hartford Wits, also known as the Connecticut Wits, who were a group of American writers centered around Yale University and flourished in the 1780s and 1790s. In 1800, Alsop wrote a monody, in heroic verse, on the death of Washington. His son, also Richard Alsop (1790–1842), a partner of W. S. Wetmore, founded the house of Alsop & Co., in Valparaíso, Chile, and Lima, Peru.

Another nephew, Joseph W. Alsop (1772–1844), had a daughter Lucy Alsop, who married Henry Chauncey, of the firm of Alsop & Chauncey, of New York City, who founded the Pacific Mail Steamship Company in 1848. His son, Joseph Wright Alsop, Jr. (1804–1878), was the father of Joseph Wright Alsop III (1838–1891), who was the father of Joseph Wright Alsop IV (1876–1953) who married Corinne Douglas Robinson (1886–1971), a niece of Theodore Roosevelt, and were the parents of Joseph Wright Alsop V (1910–1989) and Stewart Alsop (1914–1974), both American newspaper journalists and political analysts.
