= Corinne Alsop Cole =

American politician (1886–1971)

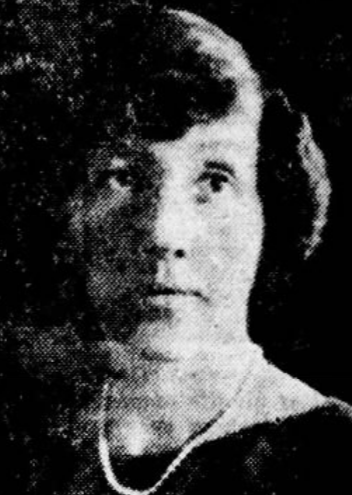

Member of the Connecticut House of Representatives from Avon
- In office 1925–1927
- Preceded by: William J. Smith
- Succeeded by: Sherman W. Eddy
- In office 1929–1933
- Preceded by: Sherman W. Eddy
- Succeeded by: Henry M. Cowles

Personal details
- Born: Corinne Douglas Robinson; July 2, 1886 Orange, New Jersey, U.S.
- Died: June 23, 1971 (aged 84) Avon, Connecticut, U.S.
- Party: Republican
- Spouses: Joseph Wright Alsop IV (m. 1909; died 1953) Francis W. Cole (m. 1956; died 1966)
- Relations: Roosevelt family
- Children: Joseph Wright Alsop V Corinne Roosevelt Alsop; Stewart Johonnot Oliver Alsop; John deKoven Alsop
- Parent(s): Douglas Robinson Jr. Corinne Roosevelt
- Education: Allenswood Academy
- Profession: Politician

Corinne Alsop Cole (born Corinne Douglas Robinson; July 2, 1886 – June 23, 1971) was an American politician who served three terms as a member of the Connecticut House of Representatives.

== Early life ==
Corinne Robinson was born on July 2, 1886, in Orange, New Jersey. She was the daughter of Corinne Roosevelt Robinson (1861–1933) and Douglas Robinson Jr. (1855–1918). She was one of four children born to her parents, including future New York State Senator Theodore Douglas Robinson (1883–1934).

Her maternal grandparents were Theodore Roosevelt Sr., a businessman and philanthropist, and socialite Martha (née Bulloch) Roosevelt. Her paternal grandparents were Douglas Robinson Sr. and Frances Monroe. Her great-grandfather was James Monroe, a member of the House of Representatives from New York and the nephew of President James Monroe.

She enjoyed a childhood of privilege and grew up on her parents' New Jersey estate. Travel and horseback rides were part of Corinne's childhood. Like her cousin Eleanor Roosevelt, she attended Allenswood Academy, a private finishing school in Wimbledon, England, under the tutelage of Marie Souvestre. Although she enjoyed the school itself, she found Souvestre abrasive and threatening. Upon her return to the states, she participated in the wedding of Franklin and Eleanor, being a bridesmaid to Eleanor.

== Career ==
She was elected to the Connecticut House of Representatives in 1924, serving three terms, from 1925 to 1927 and from 1929 to 1933, and was a leader in the Republican Party of the state. Corinne frequently spoke to large crowds and was highly effective and influential due to her stature, position and intelligence. On June 10, 1936, Alsop addressed the 1936 Republican National Convention, seconding the nomination of Kansas Governor Alfred M. Landon.

=== Relationship with Eleanor Roosevelt ===
During Franklin D. Roosevelt's tenure in the White House, Corinne was a frequent guest. Although as a Republican she disagreed politically with her cousin, she and Eleanor Roosevelt remained close throughout their lives.

Mrs. Alsop's trips to Washington, D.C. caused other family tensions. While in D.C., Alsop was often asked by both Eleanor and Alice, a leader in Washington society, to stay at her home. Mrs. Alsop's decision was usually made based on who had asked her first.

== Personal life ==
In 1909, Corinne Douglas Robinson was married to Joseph Wright Alsop IV (1876–1953). He was descended from a family that was long prominent in politics, including Continental Congressman John Alsop, Richard Alsop, John Alsop King, and his father, Dr. Joseph Wright Alsop III, the Democratic nominee for Lt. Governor of Connecticut in 1891. Alsop also served in the Connecticut General Assembly along with Corinne.

Together, they had four children:

- Joseph Wright Alsop V (1910–1989), who married Susan Mary Jay Patten (1918–2004), the daughter of Ambassador Peter Augustus Jay and a descendant of the first Chief Justice of the United States John Jay, in 1961.
- Corinne Roosevelt Alsop (1912–1997), who married Percy Chubb II of Chubb Insurance in 1932.
- Stewart Johonnot Oliver Alsop (1914–1974), who married Patricia Barnard "Tish" Hankey (1926-2012) in 1944.
- John deKoven Alsop (1915–2000), who also served in the Connecticut General Assembly and unsuccessfully ran for Governorship of Connecticut several times, and who married Augusta McLane Robinson (1924–2015) in 1947.

Joseph Wright Alsop IV died in March 1953, and she married a second time to insurance magnate Francis W. Cole in 1956. This marriage was to last ten years, with Francis dying in 1966. Corinne Alsop Cole died in 1971, at age 84, in Avon, Connecticut.

=== Descendants ===
Through her son Stewart, she was the grandmother of six grandchildren: Joseph Wright Alsop VI; Ian Alsop; Elizabeth Winthrop Alsop, a children's book author; Stewart Alsop II, an investor and pundit; Richard Nicholas Alsop, a missionary with FamilyLife; and Andrew Alsop.

Through her daughter Corinne, she was the grandmother of six: Hendon Chubb, founder of the Chubb Fellowship; Percy Chubb III, president of the Victoria Foundation; Joseph Chubb; James Chubb; Caldecot Chubb, a film producer; and Corinne Chubb Zimmermann.

Through her son John, she was the grandmother of three, John deKoven Alsop, Mary Alsop Culver, and Augusta Alsop.
