= William Theodore Dwight =

American lawyer

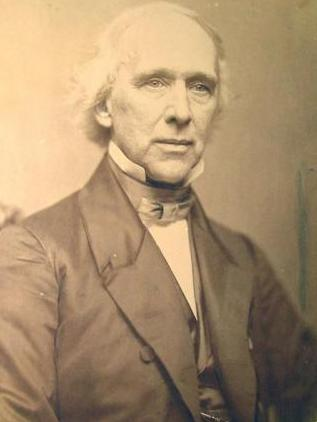
William Theodore Dwight

William Theodore Dwight (June 15, 1795 – October 22, 1865) was an American minister and member of the Dwight family.

Dwight was the son of Rev. Timothy Dwight, President of Yale College, and Mary (Woolsey) Dwight.

== Life and career ==
He was born at Greenfield Hill, Connecticut, June 15, 1795. He graduated from Yale College in 1813. Four years after his graduation he became Tutor in the college, in which office he continued till 1819. He entered upon the study of law, and, having removed to Philadelphia in 1819, was admitted to the bar in that city, in the spring of 1821. For a period of about ten years he devoted himself to that profession, but at the end of this time his views of duty led him to study theology.

He was licensed to preach in 1831, and after a short time was invited to supply the pulpit of the Third Congregational Church in Portland, Maine. He was ordained, and installed as pastor of that Church, June 6, 1832, and for thirty three years he continued to minister to the same people. The death of his wife, and his own impaired health and advancing years, led him to resign his pastorate on May 4, 1864, and immediately after his resignation he removed to Andover, Massachusetts, to reside with his daughter, the wife of Professor Egbert C. Smyth, of the Andover Theological Seminary.

He died in Andover on October 22, 1865, aged 70 years. Dr. Dwight was for many years previous to his death one of the most prominent and influential ministers in Maine, and was well known everywhere as an earnest supporter of all the institutions of Christian benevolence. He was for a long time a member of the Board of Overseers of Bowdoin College, from which institution he received the degree of Doctor of Divinity in 1846. He delivered a Phi Beta Kappa Society at Bowdoin in 1849. He was also one of the Board of Visitors of Andover Theological Seminary during a period of ten years or more, and held this office at the time of his death. He was the last survivor among the children of President Dwight, and resembled him in his appearance and manner, and in the character of his preaching.

He was married, in October, 1831, to Eliza, daughter of Thomas Bradford, Esq, of Philadelphia, who died October 2, 1863. Four children, two sons and two daughters, survived him.
