= George Waters Allsopp =

Canadian politician

- Born: 1769
- Died: September 28, 1837 (aged 67–68); Cap-Santé, Quebec, Canada
- Education: Eton College

George Waters Allsopp (1769 – September 28, 1837) was a seigneur, businessman and political figure in Lower Canada.

He was born in 1769, probably at Quebec City, the son of George Allsopp, and studied at Eton College near London. He returned to Quebec in 1785 and trained in his father's business which was based in Quebec City and in the seigneury of Jacques-Cartier. In 1794, he was named justice of the peace. He purchased his father's grist mills and part of the seigneury in 1795. Allsopp was elected to the Legislative Assembly of Lower Canada for Buckinghamshire in 1796. He inherited part of the seigneury of Auteuil when his father died in 1805. He served in the local militia during the War of 1812, becoming lieutenant-colonel. Allsopp was elected to represent Hampshire in 1814 and reelected in 1816. In 1815, he set up a small paper mill. In the late 1820s, with his brothers, he erected a toll bridge across the Jacques-Cartier River. During the 1830s, again with his brothers, Allsopp was involved in the production of planks.

He died at Cap-Santé in 1837.
