= Young Allsopp =

Wales boxer (1901–1964)

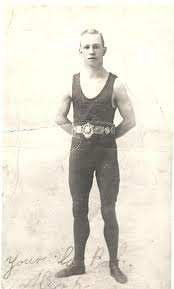

Personal information
- Nickname: Jonty
- Nationality: (Wales) Welsh
- Born: William Jonathan Alsop; 21 December 1901 Trealaw, Rhondda
- Died: 10 November 1964 Pontypridd, Glamorgan, Wales
- Weight: bantamweight

Boxing career

Boxing record
- Total fights: 10
- Wins: 6
- Win by KO: 4
- Losses: 3
- Draws: 1
- No contests: 0

William Jonathan "Jonty" Alsop (21 December 1901 – 10 November 1964) was a professional boxer from Wales who fought under the name Young Allsopp. Based in his home village of Trealaw in the Rhondda Valley, Allsopp was notable for becoming the Welsh bantamweight champion in 1921.

== Boxing career ==
Alsop was born in the village of Trealaw in the industrial coal mining region of the Rhondda Valley to English parents who had moved to the area from Bristol. A coal miner by profession, Alsop took to boxing as a youth and was fighting in recognized bouts while still a teenager. Early promotions gave him the name Young Allsopp (sic), and he fought under that nickname for the rest of his career.

From the beginnings of his career, Allsopp would travel into England to face opponents and was a regular fighter at the Liverpool Stadium. By the early 1920s a system of weight titles were devised for the Wales region, and Allsopp was selected as one of the Welsh fighters to challenge, through a series of eliminators, for the bantamweight title. On his way to the final, he beat Rhondda opponent Harold Jones, Blaenavon's Silas Bunch and Arthur Bishop from Caerphilly. This led to a showdown with Billy Davies from Cardiff, held at the Cardiff Empire on 22 October 1921. The fight was intended to be the main event at a charity tournament held to raise funds for the Mametz Ward at the Cardiff Royal Infirmary, but the bout was overshadowed by a mock fight between Jimmy Wilde and popular music hall comedian George Robey. The fight between Allsopp and Davies was intended for 20 rounds, and the referee, Jim Driscoll, was called upon during the fight to admonish Davies in the early rounds. Davies was cut through the illegal use of the head, but also suffered from the superior boxing skills displayed by Allsopp. In the 11th round Davies charged head-down into an attack and suffered a gash to his forehead. He was behind on points, and his seconds threw in the towel, leaving Allsopp the Welsh bantamweight champion.

Allsopp only defended his title once, against Albert Colcombe, a fighter originally from Tylorstown in Wales, but then based in Yorkshire. The fight was held at the Llwynypia Baths to a packed house on 20 May 1922. Although set for twenty rounds, the fight only reached the tenth, after Allsopp was stopped through a badly cut eye. Allsopp fought on for a few more years, before a fall from a roof ended both his fighting and mining careers. He sold his Welsh title belt to fund a business as a confectioner, with shops in the Rhondda and Rhoose. He died from a heart attack in 1964 at the age of 63.
