= Thomas Allsopp =

English cricketer and footballer (1880–1919)

Personal information
- Full name: Thomas Charlesworth Allsopp
- Born: 18 December 1880; Leicester, England
- Died: 7 March 1919 (aged 38); Norwich, Norfolk, England
- Batting: Left-handed
- Bowling: Slow left-arm orthodox

Domestic team information
- Years: Team
- 1903–1905: Leicestershire
- 1909–1912: Norfolk

Career statistics
Competition	First-class
Matches	37
Runs scored	347
Batting average	9.13
100s/50s	0/0
Top score	32
Balls bowled	5,129
Wickets	88
Bowling average	28.29
5 wickets in innings	4
10 wickets in match	1
Best bowling	6/85
Catches/stumpings	10/–
- Source: CricketArchive, 9 August 2008

Thomas Allsopp
Personal information
- Position: Outside left

Senior career*
Years	Team	Apps	(Gls)
1899–1902	Leicester Fosse	34	(4)
1902–1904	Luton Town		
1904–1905	Leicester Fosse	30	(4)
1905–1907	Brighton & Hove Albion	72	(7)
- Norwich City
- * Club domestic league appearances and goals

Thomas Charlesworth Allsopp (18 December 1880 – 7 March 1919) was an English cricketer and footballer who played first-class cricket for Leicestershire County Cricket Club and the Marylebone Cricket Club. His highest score of 32 came when playing for Leicestershire in the match against Hampshire. His best bowling of 6/85 came when playing for Leicestershire against London County.

He also played 27 Minor Counties Championship games for Norfolk.

== Football career ==
Allsopp played as an outside left in the Football League for Leicester Fosse and in the Southern League for Brighton & Hove Albion, Luton Town and Norwich City.

== Personal life ==
In May 1911, Allsopp took ownership of the Hero of Redan pub on Thorpe Road in Norwich. He served as a sergeant in the Queen's Royal Regiment (West Surrey) and the Labour Corps during the First World War. After returning home from the war, he fell victim to the 1918 flu pandemic and died in Norwich on 7 March 1919. He was buried with military honours in Earlham Road Cemetery in the city.
