= Alsop, Virginia =

- Unincorporated community
- Location within the Commonwealth of Virginia Alsop, Virginia (Virginia) Alsop, Virginia (the United States)
- Coordinates: 38°12′25″N 77°38′58″W
- Country: United States
- State: Virginia
- County: Spotsylvania
- Time zone: UTC−5 (Eastern (EST))
  - Summer (DST): UTC−4 (EDT)

Alsop is an unincorporated community in Spotsylvania County in the U.S. state of Virginia. Alsop is located along Shady Grove Road (VA 608) to the west of Spotsylvania Courthouse.
