= George Alsop =

British writer who lived in Maryland (1638-1673)

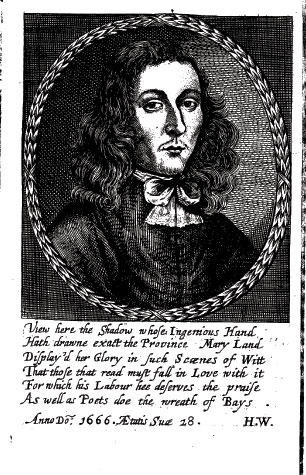
Portrait of George Alsop from the 1666 first edition of A Character of the Province of Maryland

George Alsop, an English author, was probably born in London in 1636; the year and place of his death are unknown. Very little about his life is known, except for what is mentioned in his book, which indicates that he was likely to have been born, and certainly spent some of his youth, in London, England.

Alsop is remembered for a significant work on colonial Maryland with a title unusually long even by the standards of the seventeenth century: A Character of the Province of Mary-Land, wherein is Described in four distinct Parts, (Viz.) I The Scituation, and plenty of the Province. II The Laws, Customs, and natural Demeanor of the Inhabitant. III The worst and best Usage of a Mary-Land Servant, opened in view. IV The Traffique and vendable Commodities of the Countrey. Also a small Treatise on the wilde and naked Indians (or Susquehanokes) of Mary-Land, their Customs, Manners, Absurdities, & Religion. Together with a Collection of Historical Letters.(London, 1666).

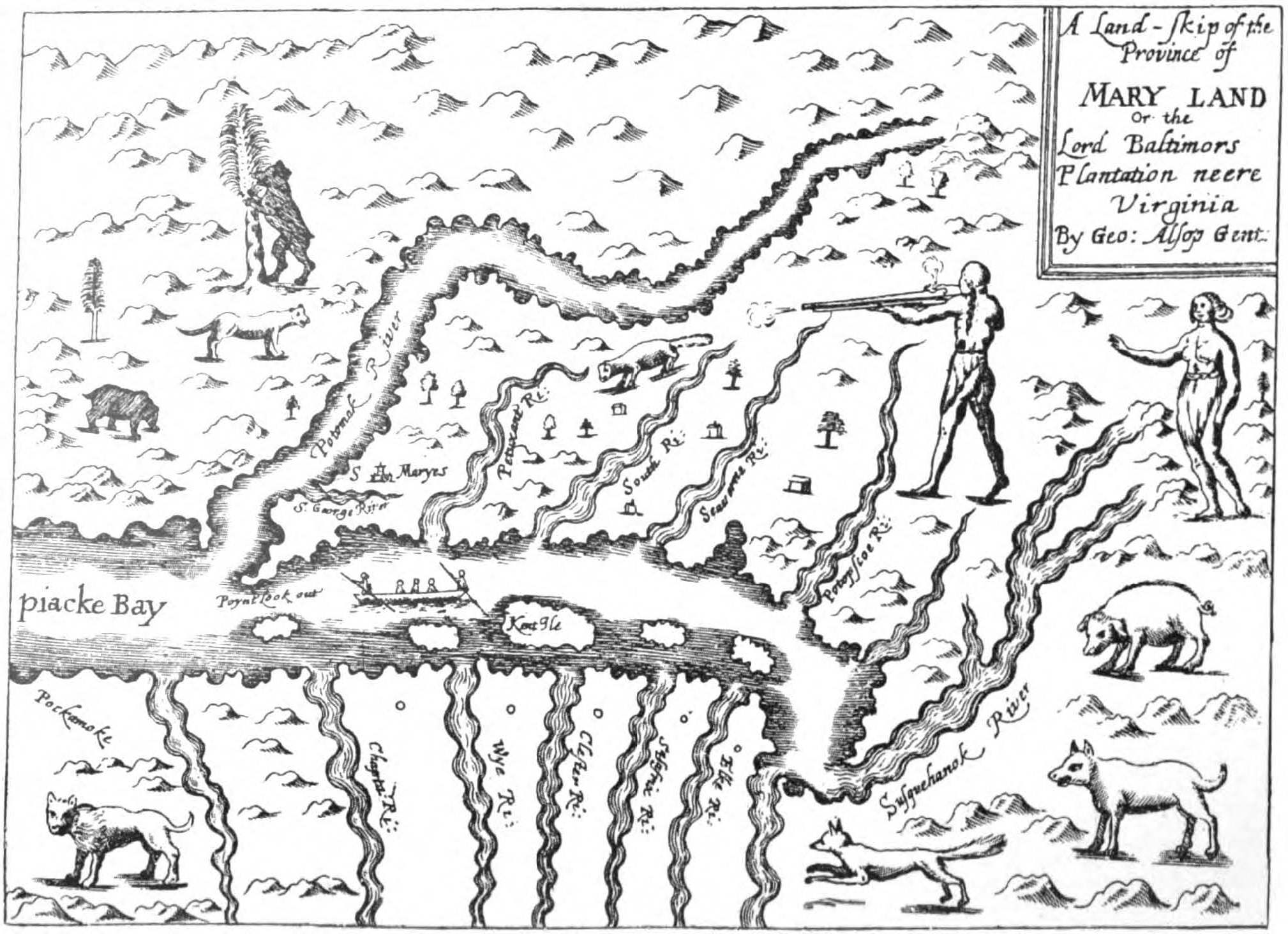
Alsop's map of the Province of Mary-land, 1666

After an obscure two-year apprenticeship he left London in 1658 due to a hatred for its local Puritans, according to his own account. Alsop worked as an indentured servant for two years. His master, Thomas Stockett (1635-1671), was one of four brothers who immigrated from England in 1658 and settled in Baltimore County, Maryland. George Alsop appreciated the new colony, but at the end of his service to Thomas Stockett, he grew ill and returned to England. He then published his book, and may also have written a volume of Sermons, a work presented later by someone of the same name. In the work on Maryland, Alsop asserts that his design is to encourage European and English emigration to America. Alsop's eagerness to praise every aspect of Maryland makes his work a permanent record of the psychology of advertising. It also serves to a lesser extent as a reliable historical source of information for early Baltimore County, Maryland, and the then native Susquehannock.
