= Joseph Wright Alsop IV =

American politician and businessman (1876–1953)

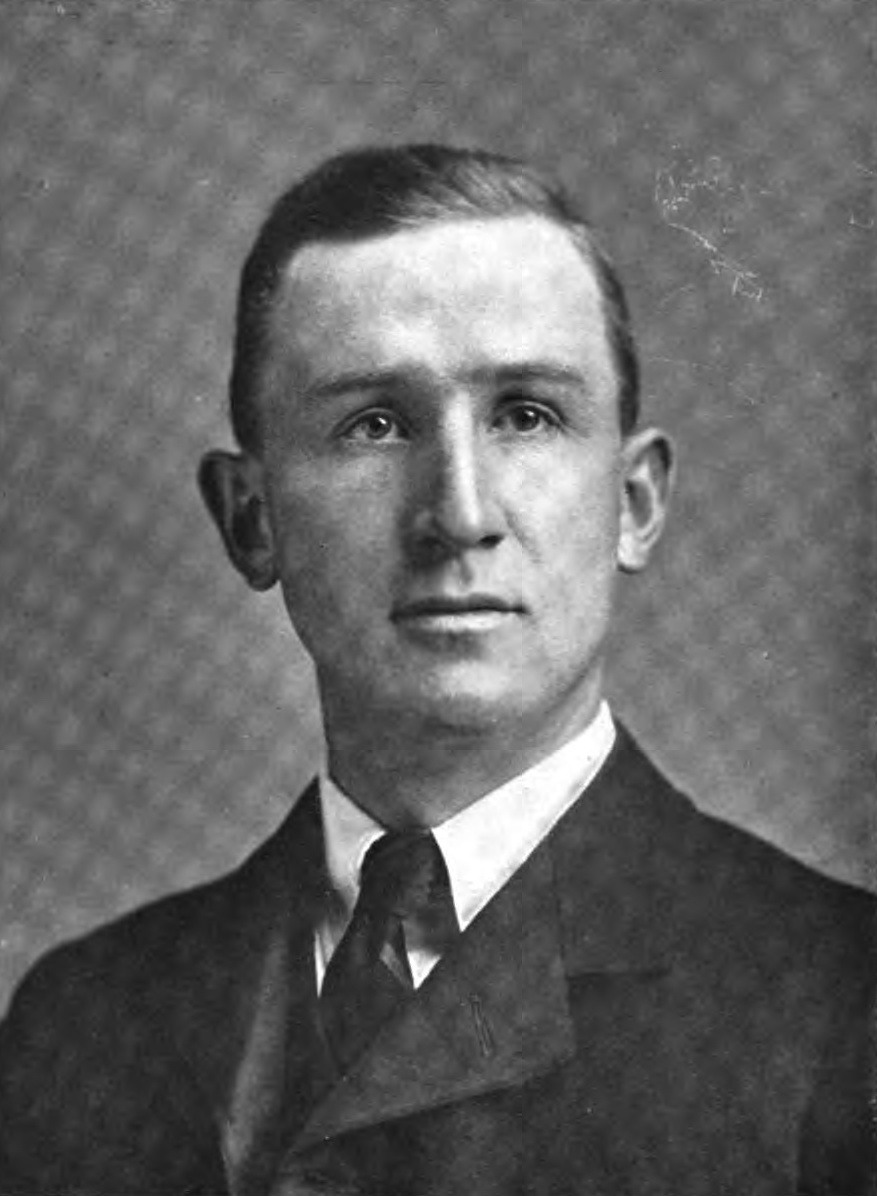
- Alsop circa 1911

Member of the Connecticut Senate from the 5th district
- In office 1909–1911

Personal details
- Born: April 2, 1876 Middletown, Connecticut, US
- Died: March 17, 1953 (aged 76) Charleston, South Carolina, US
- Resting place: Indian Hill Cemetery, Middletown, Connecticut, US
- Party: Republican Party; Bull Moose Party
- Spouse: Corinne Alsop Cole
- Children: Joseph Wright Alsop V; Stewart Alsop; John deKoven Alsop; Corinne Roosevelt Alsop
- Education: Humboldt University of Berlin; Sheffield Scientific School
- Occupation: Politician, businessman, farmer

Joseph Wright Alsop IV (April 2, 1876 – March 17, 1953) was an American politician and father of Joseph Wright Alsop V and Stewart Alsop. He served in the Connecticut General Assembly and ran for Congress on the Bull Moose Party ticket.

== Early life and education ==
Alsop was born on April 2, 1876, in Middletown, Connecticut, to parents Joseph Wright Alsop III (1838–1891) and Elizabeth Winthrop (Beach) Alsop (1847–1889). Alsop IV was a scion of the Alsop family of Middletown, which included Continental Congress delegate John Alsop, author Richard Alsop, and New York governor John Alsop King. His father, Joseph III, was a wealthy physician and state senator who was the Democratic nominee for Lieutenant Governor of Connecticut in 1890.

Alsop IV attended the Groton School in Massachusetts and spent a year studying at the Friedrich Wilhelm University in Berlin before receiving the engineering curriculum at the Sheffield Scientific School at Yale University. He graduated in 1898. Alsop then worked for a Colorado ranching company until 1901 and for a manufacturing company in Middletown until 1903, when he moved to Avon, Connecticut, purchased a 150-acre farm, grew tobacco, and raised cattle, specializing in Ayreshires.

== Career ==
Alsop worked as president of two insurance companies: the Hartford County Municipal Fire Insurance Company and the Connecticut Valley Mutual Hail Insurance Company. He served on the board of the State Public Utilities Commission for 26 years and chaired the board for twelve of those years. He served as first selectman of Avon for 35 years.

Alsop served one term in the Connecticut House of Representatives (1907), serving on the Committee for Incorporations. He went on to serve two terms in the Connecticut State Senate (1909 and 1911), chairing the Committee on Roads, Bridges, and Rivers. A Republican during his legislative service, Alsop ran unsuccessfully for the US House of Representatives on the Progressive Party ticket in 1912 and served on the Progressive Party's national committee that year as well.

Alsop was committed to the cause of Connecticut agriculture. He served as president of the Connecticut Valley Tobacco Association (1922–1927), the Connecticut Dairymen's Association, and the American Ayreshire Breeders Association. He was a long-time member of the board of directors of the Connecticut Agricultural Experiment Station, retiring in 1950.

Alsop served over three decades on the University of Connecticut's Board of Trustees (1909–1942), when the institution's teaching emphasis was on agriculture. The Joseph Wright Alsop Hall on UConn's Storrs campus was named in his honor.

== Personal life ==
Alsop married Corinne Douglas Robinson (1886–1971) on November 4, 1909. She was a member of the Roosevelt family (Eleanor Roosevelt was her cousin and Theodore Roosevelt her uncle) and had her own political career, serving in the Connecticut House of Representatives in 1924 and again in 1931. The couple had four children, all of whom became prominent society figures: Joseph Wright Alsop V, Stewart Alsop, John deKoven Alsop, and Corinne Roosevelt Alsop (wife of the heir to Chubb Limited).

Alsop IV died on March 17, 1953, while on vacation in Charleston, South Carolina. His wife and children survived him. He was interred at Indian Hill Cemetery.
