= George Allsopp (Canadian merchant) =

Quebec businessman and government official

George Allsopp (c. 1733 – 14 April 1805) was a British-born Canadian businessman and government office holder. He became a merchant in Quebec in the 1760s and a seigneur in 1773. He went heavily into debt to open a gristmill, which in 1788 was the province's largest producer of flour. He also lobbied the Quebec and British government for reforms to the Quebec judicial system and the creation of a legislative assembly. He was also appointed to various government positions, including the province's executive council and as a justice of the peace.

== Early life and government career ==
Allsopp was born in England c. 1733. During the 1758 Siege of Louisbourg, Allsopp worked for the British Quartermaster General’s Department. In 1759 he was the secretary to the quartermaster general of Quebec, Guy Carleton, 1st Baron Dorchester.

== Start of merchant career ==
In 1761 he settled in Montreal, and was a junior partner in a firm called Jenkins, Trye and Company and facilitated the trade of wheat, timber, fur, fish, potash, spirits, and iron. In the same year he became a vocal critic of James Murray, Quebec's military governor, after Murray enacted measures to curtail the activities of British merchants. Allsopp further criticized Murray when the latter decided to govern the province with an appointed council instead of an elected assembly, and established separate civil and criminal courts. In 1764 Allsopp helped to draft a statement that was presented by the first grand jury of Quebec. The statement condemned Murray's administration and demanded that the grand jury become recognised as Quebec's temporary representative body. A clause that opposed Roman Catholics from serving on juries was included in the statement and attributed to Allsopp.

In March 1764, and twice in October 1764, Allsopp was arrested for violating an order to carry lanterns during the night. There was violence every time he was arrested and Allsopp would denounce the military. In October he prosecuted the soldiers involved in his arrests.

== Expanded business and government appointments ==
In 1766 Allsopp was appointed as deputy provincial secretary and assistant clerk for the Council of Quebec and provincial enrolments. Murray refused to recognise the appointments but was recalled to England in June. Guy Carleton was appointed as lieutenant governor of the province and Allsopp assumed his appointed roles. His job included issuing annual licences for taverns and fur-traders.

In 1766 he started a company with two other businessmen, John Welles and Samuel Jacobs, to manage a potash works in Lower Town. He began an association with Olive, Watson and Rashleigh sometime around 1767 and became their central agent in Quebec. In 1769 he was appointed deputy commissary general, which involved allocating provisions to outposts across Quebec. The potash works failed in 1772, and in 1773 he bought adjacent seigneuries with his brother-in-law John Bondfield, which included a gristmill. Two years later Allsopp bought Bondfield's land and continued operating the gristmill, which caused Allsopp to become indebted to his grain suppliers.

Allsopp was the commissary general during the 1775 American invasion of Quebec and that year was appointed to Quebec's Legislative Council. Nevertheless, government officials began to question Allsopp's loyalty to Britain, citing Allsopp's criticism of the Quebec Act. He was removed from his government positions in 1777 and publicly assaulted in 1778 while accused of being a rebel.

In 1778 Allsopp increased the amount of debt he owed by building a gristmill on the Jacques-Cartier River, which was coupled with debts from wartime trade restrictions, and conflicts with other merchants. In 1784 he travelled to London to negotiate a financial settlement for his firm and speak with politicians about his dismissal from the Quebec Legislative Council, reforms to the Quebec judicial system, and appealing the Quebec Act. In 1783, all interest on his debts was cancelled by the King in Council.

Allsopp returned to Quebec in 1785 and continued to advocate for reforms to the judicial system. In 1787, he participated in an investigation into the Quebec justice system and criticised its inconsistency. He continued expanding his business and in 1788 his milling complex was the province's largest producer of flour. He was also a leading figure in advocating for a representative assembly and the adoption of English commercial law, and in 1789 advocated for a trade agreement with the British West Indies. When the Constitutional Act of 1791 was adopted, which split Quebec into two provinces, Allsopp claimed that he was to be credited for its passage.

In 1792 he lost the election to represent Upper Town Quebec in the province's legislative assembly, and his appointment to the legislative and executive councils was rejected by Home secretary William Wyndham Grenville. He withdrew from provincial politics at this time and rarely commented on provincial affairs in the 1790s. In 1793 a fire destroyed his main gristmill, and a second mill was destroyed in 1796. The mills were rebuilt and operational shortly afterwards, and a third mill was added to the complex. In 1799 he was appointed as a Quebec justice of the peace.

== Personal life and death ==
Allsopp married Anna Marie Bondfield in December 1768. The couple had ten children, although only seven survived past infancy.

Allsopp's financial obligations caused him to abandon plans to retire to England. He died in Cap-Santé, Quebec, on 14 April 1805, after suffering a series of strokes.

Allsop owned three slaves in Canada.
