= Joseph Alsop =

American columnist (1910–1989)

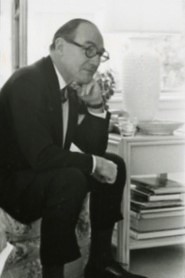
- Alsop in 1974
- Born: Joseph Wright Alsop V October 10, 1910; Avon, Connecticut, U.S.
- Died: August 28, 1989 (aged 78); Georgetown, Washington, D.C., U.S.
- Resting place: Indian Hill Cemetery
- Education: Harvard University (AB)
- Occupations: Journalist; columnist
- Spouse: Susan Mary Jay (m. 1961; div. 1978)
- Parents: Joseph Wright Alsop IV (father); Corinne Alsop Cole (mother)

Joseph Wright Alsop V (October 10, 1910 – August 28, 1989) was an American journalist and syndicated newspaper columnist from the 1930s through the 1970s. He was an influential journalist and top insider in Washington, D.C., from 1945 to the late 1960s, often in conjunction with his brother Stewart Alsop. He also worked as a covert operative of the Central Intelligence Agency.

== Early life and education ==
Alsop was born on October 10, 1910, in Avon, Connecticut, to Joseph Wright Alsop IV (1876–1953) and Corinne Douglas Robinson (1886–1971). Through his mother, he was related to Presidents Theodore Roosevelt and James Monroe. Both of Alsop's parents were active in Republican politics. His father unsuccessfully sought the governorship of Connecticut several times, his mother founded the Connecticut League of Republican Women in 1917, and both served in the Connecticut General Assembly, as did his younger brother John deKoven Alsop.

Alsop graduated from the Groton School, a private boarding school in Groton, Massachusetts, in 1928, and from Harvard University in 1932. He wrote for The Harvard Crimson during his time at Harvard.

== Career ==
After college, Alsop became a reporter, then an unusual career for someone with an Ivy League diploma. He began his career with the New York Herald Tribune and fast established a substantial reputation as a journalist, particularly by his comprehensive reportage of the Bruno Hauptmann trial in 1934.

Because of his family ties to the Roosevelts, Alsop soon became well-connected in Franklin Roosevelt's Washington. By 1936, The Saturday Evening Post had awarded him a contract to write about politics with fellow journalist Turner Catledge. Two years later, the North American Newspaper Alliance (NANA) contracted Alsop and Robert E. Kintner to write a nationally syndicated column on a daily basis. His first book, The 168 Days (1938), covering Roosevelt's unsuccessful campaign to enlarge the Supreme Court, became a bestseller. In 1940, Alsop and Kintner moved from NANA to the New York Herald Tribune.

In 1941, after it had become clear that the United States would soon enter World War II, Alsop and Kintner suspended their column and volunteered for the armed forces. Alsop entered the US Navy and used his political connections to be assigned as Staff Historian to Claire Lee Chennault's American Volunteer Group, later famous as the Flying Tigers, while the group was training at Toungoo, Burma. While on a supply mission for Chennault late in the fall of 1941, he found himself trapped in the Battle of Hong Kong on December 7. Unable to secure passage out of the city, Alsop was eventually taken into custody as an enemy alien and interned at Hong Kong by the Imperial Japanese Army. After six months, he was repatriated through a prisoner exchange as a journalist, but he had really been a combatant, a fact he managed to conceal by changing into civilian clothes and with the help of friends. He traveled back to the United States on the neutral liner Gripsholm. He returned to China as a civilian Lend-lease administrator in the fall of 1942, assigned to the wartime capital of Free China, Chongqing. He eventually rejoined Chennault in Kunming, China and served with him for the remaining months of the war.

After the war, Alsop resumed his journalism career, now working with his brother Stewart to produce a thrice-weekly piece, called "Matter of Fact", for the Herald Tribune. The use of the word "fact" reflected Alsop's pride in producing a column based on reporting, rather than the opinion pieces of many other columnists. The Alsop brothers operated on a fundamental rule that every column must always include at least one new piece of information. Stewart remained headquartered in Washington to cover domestic politics, and Joseph traveled the world, covering foreign affairs. In late 1955, their column reached a readership of 25 million in two hundred newspapers across the country. Alsop also helped the CIA in its intelligence-gathering activities, using his status as a foreign correspondent as cover. In 1953, Alsop covered the Philippine general election at the CIA's request.

The partnership of the Alsop brothers lasted from 1945 until 1958. Joseph became the sole author of "Matter of Fact" and he moved to The Washington Post until his retirement in 1974. The Alsops once described themselves as "Republicans by inheritance and registration, and... conservatives by political conviction." Despite his identity as a conservative Republican, however, Alsop was an early supporter of the presidential ambitions of Democrat John F. Kennedy. Alsop attended the Los Angeles Democratic Convention in July 1960, where along with Phil Graham he convinced Kennedy to appoint Lyndon B. Johnson as his running mate. He became a close friend and influential adviser to Kennedy after his election, in November 1960. Additionally, "while Stewart was more liberal than Joseph, he nonetheless characterized both of them as 'New Deal liberals'".

Joseph Alsop was a vocal supporter of America's involvement in the Vietnam War, and in his column, he strongly advocated for escalation. His journalistic purpose has often been described as "not to enlighten but to effect." His insider access to the Washington elite granted him plenty of confidential information, revealed mostly at the dinner parties of the "Georgetown Set.” Alsop was particularly skilled at playing on Johnson's political vulnerabilities to push him to deepen US commitment in Indochina. He wanted to provoke the president into action as he warned about the impact a defeat would have on American credibility, attacked Johnson's manhood by accusing him of weakness and compared him to Kennedy. Convinced Alsop's writing limited his maneuverability in Vietnam, Johnson came to resent Alsop's constant demands for war and critiques of his policy.

In 1963, he became the first to make public the "Maneli affair", revealing in a column entitled "Very Ugly Stuff" that Mieczysław Maneli, the Polish Commissioner to the International Control Commission had twice met Ngô Đình Nhu, the younger brother and right-hand man of President Ngô Đình Diệm of South Vietnam. Maneli had come bearing an offer for South Vietnam to be neutral in the Cold War and for a federation with North Vietnam. Alsop had visited Saigon, where Nhu leaked the meeting to him. Alsop wrote "the facts all too clearly point to a French intrigue...to defeat American policy [in South Vietnam]."

Alsop's fixation on Vietnam resulted in his writing being out of touch with contemporaneous affairs. Joseph Alsop failed to report on the Women's Liberation Movement and the proceedings of the Civil Rights movement, in particular the assassination of Martin Luther King Jr. in 1968. By 1966, Alsop was isolated from the Washington press corps as the American public turned against the war. Even as the popularity of his column declined and he lost close friendships, Alsop's hawkish attitude remained unwavering until the end of the Vietnam War.

== Personal life ==
In 1961, he married Susan Mary Jay Patten, daughter of diplomat Peter Augustus Jay, a descendant of John Jay, and the widow of William Patten, an American diplomat who was one of Alsop's friends. By this marriage he had two stepchildren, William and Anne. The couple divorced in 1978.

A noted art connoisseur and collector, Alsop delivered six lectures at the National Gallery of Art in Washington on The History of Art Collecting in the summer of 1978.

He was at work on a memoir when he died at his home in the Georgetown section of Washington, D.C., on August 28, 1989. He is buried at Indian Hill Cemetery, Middletown, Connecticut. The memoir was published posthumously as I've Seen the Best of It.

=== Sexuality ===
Alsop kept his homosexuality a closely guarded secret all of his life. Richard Helms called him "a scrupulously closeted homosexual." During his service in World War II he informed Army Chief of Staff George C. Marshall that he had contracted syphilis from his sexual encounters, but Marshall refused to pass the information to President Franklin D. Roosevelt because of Alsop's relations to the Roosevelt family. Nevertheless, Senator Joseph McCarthy insinuated that Alsop was homosexual in the course of a dispute with The Saturday Evening Post about its coverage of his campaign to remove homosexuals from government employment. When McCarthy implied that Alsop was not "healthy and normal," a Post editor vouched for him: "I know Alsop well, and I know he is a man of high character, with great courage and integrity."

Early in 1957, the KGB photographed him in a hotel room in Moscow while he was having sex with another man, an agent of the Soviet Union. He rebuffed Soviet attempts at blackmail, instead writing "a detailed account of the incident and a relevant narrative history of his sex life." It has been described as "brimming with revelations about Alsop's sex life on several continents," including a report that one of his lovers was Arthur H. Vandenberg Jr., who had resigned as Dwight Eisenhower's appointments secretary in 1953. His accounts, delivered to a friend in the CIA, quickly reached the FBI, allowing J. Edgar Hoover to spread the information through the Eisenhower administration, many of whose members had fought sharp battles with Alsop.

Hoover told Lyndon B. Johnson about the Moscow incident in 1964, and Johnson told Secretary of Defense Robert S. McNamara about Alsop's FBI file. In 1965, Alsop complained to friends that Johnson was tapping his phone, a claim that infuriated Johnson, who believed that he had protected Alsop from McCarthy's attacks. Alsop told White House Press Secretary Bill Moyers that he believed the administration was tapping his phone and was spreading gossip about his personal life, all in an attempt to stop leaks. When Moyers reported the charges, Johnson ordered Attorney General Nicholas Katzenbach to be certain no such wiretap was in place and protested that he never ordered one: "I'm as innocent of it as I am of murdering your wife," he told Katzenbach.

In the 1970s, the Soviets sent the aforementioned photos to several prominent American journalists without adverse consequences. Alsop considered making his homosexuality public to end the harassment but decided otherwise.

== Legacy ==
In Gore Vidal's novel Washington, D.C. (1967), the character of a gay journalist is loosely based on Alsop.

Alsop's life was dramatized in David Auburn's play The Columnist, which ran on Broadway from April 25 to July 8, 2012, and focused on the interplay of his politics, his journalism, and his sexuality. He was portrayed by John Lithgow in the original production.

== Publications ==
Politics

- Joseph Alsop; Turner Catledge (1938). The 168 Days. Doubleday, Doran & Co.
- Joseph Alsop; Robert Kintner (1939). Men Around the President. Doubleday, Doran & Co.
- Joseph Alsop; Robert Kintner (1940). American White Paper: The Story of American Diplomacy and the Second World War. Simon & Schuster.
- Joseph Alsop; Stewart Alsop (1954). We Accuse! The Story of the Miscarriage of American Justice in the Case of J. Robert Oppenheimer. Simon and Schuster.
- Joseph Alsop; Stewart Alsop (1958). The Reporter's Trade. Reynal and Co.
- Joseph Alsop (1982). FDR, 1882–1945: A Centenary Remembrance. Thorndike Press.

Memoirs

- Joseph Alsop; Adam Platt (1992). "I've Seen the Best of It": Memoirs. W. W. Norton & Co. ISBN 978-0393029178.

Art

- Joseph Alsop (1964). From the Silent Earth: A Report on the Greek Bronze Age. Harper & Row.
- Joseph Alsop (1982). The Rare Art Traditions: The History of Art Collecting and Its Linked Phenomena Wherever These Have Appeared. Harper & Row.
