= Stewart Alsop =

American newspaper columnist and political analyst

- Born: Stewart Johonnot Oliver Alsop; May 17, 1914; Avon, Connecticut, U.S.
- Died: May 26, 1974 (aged 60); Washington, D.C., U.S.
- Burial place: Indian Hill Cemetery, Middletown, Connecticut, U.S.
- Education: Groton School; Yale University
- Occupations: Journalist; columnist
- Spouse: Patricia Barnard Hankey (m. 1944)
- Children: 6
- Parents: Joseph Wright Alsop IV; Corinne Douglas Robinson
- Relatives: Roosevelt family
- Military career
- Branch: British Army; US Army
- Conflicts: World War II
- Awards: Croix de Guerre

Stewart Johonnot Oliver Alsop (May 17, 1914 – May 26, 1974) was an American newspaper columnist and political analyst.

== Early life ==
Alsop was born and raised in Avon, Connecticut, from an old Yankee family. Alsop attended Groton School and Yale University. His parents were Joseph Wright Alsop IV (1876–1953) and Corinne Douglas Robinson (1886–1971). Through his mother, he was a grandnephew of Theodore Roosevelt.

== Early career ==
After graduating from Yale in 1936, Alsop moved to New York City, where he worked as an editor for the publishing house of Doubleday, Doran.

== World War II ==
After the United States entered World War II, Alsop joined the British Army because his high blood pressure precluded his joining the U.S. Army.

A month after the wedding, Alsop was allowed to transfer to the US Army, and he was immediately sent on a mission planned by the Office of Strategic Services (OSS). For the mission, Alsop was parachuted into the Périgord region of France to aid the French Resistance. Alsop was later awarded the Croix de Guerre with Palm for his work on that and other wartime missions. Alsop worked with and for the OSS for the rest of the war.

== Journalism ==
From 1945 to 1958, Stewart Alsop was co-writer, with his brother Joseph, of the thrice-weekly "Matter of Fact" column for the New York Herald Tribune. Stewart usually stayed in Washington and covered domestic politics, and Joseph traveled the world to cover foreign affairs. In 1958, the Alsops described themselves as "Republicans by inheritance and registration, and... conservatives by political conviction."

After the Alsop brothers ended their partnership, Stewart went on to write articles and a regular column for the Saturday Evening Post until 1968 and then a weekly column for Newsweek from 1968 to 1974. In January 1960 he wrote an article for the Post titled I saw what makes communism work.

He published several books, including a "sort of memoir" of his battle with an unusual form of leukemia, Stay of Execution. He wrote, "A dying man wants to die like a sleepy man wants to sleep." At the end of his battle with cancer, he requested that he be given something other than morphine to numb the pain because he was tired of its sedative effect. His doctor suggested heroin.

== Family ==
On June 20, 1944, Alsop married Patricia Barnard "Tish" Hankey, whom he met while training in England, where she lived. Together, they had six children: Joseph Wright Alsop VI; Ian; Elizabeth Winthrop, a children's book author; Stewart Alsop Jr., an investor and pundit; Richard Nicholas, a Curriculum Coordinator at Josh McDowell Ministry; and Andrew Alsop.

== Written works ==
- Sub Rosa: The O.S.S. and American Espionage (1946, with Thomas Braden)
- We Accuse! The Story of the Miscarriage of American Justice in the Case of J. Robert Oppenheimer (1954, with Joseph Alsop)
- The Reporter's Trade (1958, with Joseph Alsop)
- Nixon & Rockefeller: A Double Portrait (1960)
- The Center: People and Power in Political Washington (1968)
- Stay of Execution: A Sort of Memoir (1973)
