= Richard Alsop =

American writer (1761–1815)

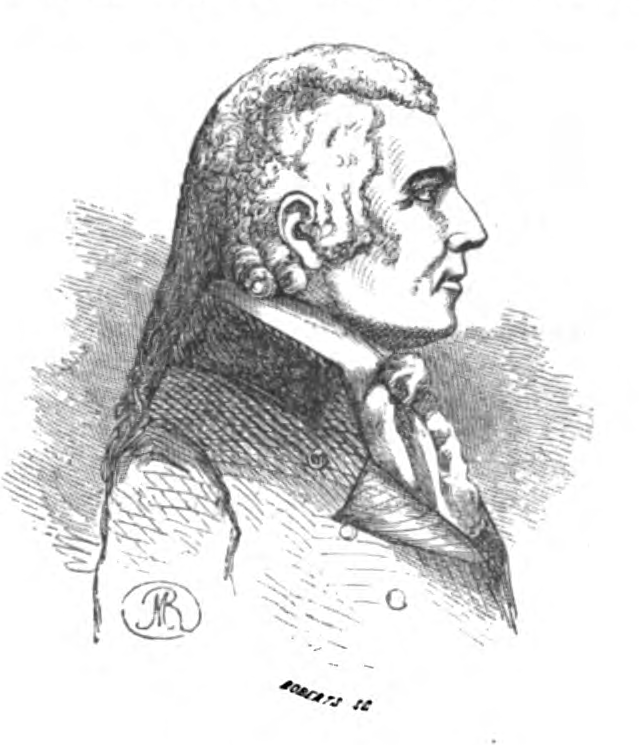
- Born: 23 January 1761
- Died: 20 August 1815 (aged 54); Long Island
- Occupation: Poet, writer
- Spouse(s): Mary Wyllys Pomeroy
- Parent(s): Richard Alsop; Mary Alsop
- Relatives: Joseph Wright Alsop

Richard Alsop (January 23, 1761 – August 20, 1815) was an American writer from the Alsop family of Middletown, Connecticut.

== Biography and family life ==
Richard Alsop was born January 23, 1761. His father (1727–1776) and son were also named Richard Alsop, which has led to confusion in historical sources. His mother was Abigail Sackett. He was a member of the literary group called the Hartford Wits, and contributed verse to the Political Greenhouse and the Echo.

This Richard Alsop was not a merchant, as is sometimes stated. Although he translated a work on Chile (largely from an Italian edition), he never traveled to South America or anywhere else abroad. (The Richard Alsop who made a fortune trading in Peru and Chile in the 1820s was his son.)

His sister Abigail Alsop married Theodore Dwight (1764–1846). He married Mary Wyllis and died on August 20, 1815, in Long Island, New York.
