= Douglas Robinson Sr. =

Scottish-American banker and businessman

Douglas Robinson
- Born: March 24, 1824; Scotland
- Died: November 30, 1893 (aged 69); Aboard the SS Kaiser Wilhelm II
- Education: Edinburgh University
- Spouse: Frances Monroe (m. 1850)
- Children: Douglas Robinson Jr. Harriet Douglas Robinson
- Parent(s): William Rose Robinson; Mary Douglas
- Relatives: William Rose Robinson (brother); Theodore Douglas Robinson (grandson); Corinne Robinson (granddaughter)

Douglas Robinson Sr. (March 24, 1824 – November 30, 1893) was a Scottish-American banker and businessman who was prominent in New York society during the Gilded Age. He was married to Fanny Monroe, the daughter of U.S. Representative James Monroe and grandniece of James Monroe, the 5th President of the United States. Their son, Douglas Robinson Jr., was married to Corinne Roosevelt, sister of President Theodore Roosevelt and aunt of First Lady Eleanor Roosevelt.

== Early life ==
Robinson was born on March 24, 1824, in Scotland and was descended from Scottish landed gentry. He was the youngest of four sons born to William Rose Robinson of Clermiston (1781–1834) and Mary (née Douglas) Robinson (1783–1864). He was the younger brother of Sir William Rose Robinson, KCSI, who served as acting Governor of Madras. His sister, Saida Douglas Robinson, was married to Alexander Davidson.

His paternal grandparents were George Robinson and Elizabeth (née Innes) Robinson. His maternal grandparents were James Douglas of Orchardton, a Glasgow merchant, and Elizabeth (née Douglas) Douglas. His maternal uncle was William Douglas, a Member of Parliament in the House of Commons, and his great-uncle was Sir William Douglas, 1st Baronet, of Gelston Castle, Scotland, both of whom died unmarried with no children. Robinson's maternal grandfather, James Douglas, was the brother of George Douglas, the maternal grandfather of his eventual wife Fanny. According to Marian Campbell Gouverneur (daughter-in-law of Samuel L. Gouverneur, himself a nephew and son-in-law of President Monroe), "George Douglas was a Scotch merchant who hoarded closely. His wine cellar was more extensive than his library."

== Career ==
After studying at Edinburgh University, eighteen-year-old Robinson emigrated from Scotland to the United States in 1842. He started in business in Philadelphia and later came to New York as a partner in the banking house of James K. Soutter's Sons. He later served as secretary of the Great Western Insurance Company, which was then known as the United States Lloyds.

=== Society life ===
In 1892, Robinson, as well as his son Douglas and daughter-in-law Corinne, was included in Ward McAllister's "Four Hundred", purported to be an index of New York's best families, published in The New York Times. Conveniently, 400 was the number of people that could fit into Mrs. Astor's ballroom.

The Robinson's had a country home in the Catskills, in the style of a Scottish Castle, in Jordanville, New York that was known as Henderson House and modeled after Sir William Douglas' Gelston Castle in Scotland. Henderson House was a 5,000-acre plot of a 15,000-acre grant from Queen Anne to Fanny's 2x great-grandfather, James Henderson. Fanny had inherited the home from her aunt Harriet (née Douglas) Cruger, the sister of her mother, Elizabeth Douglas Monroe. Cruger was an eccentric lady known for her many friendships with prominent people of her time, including Sir Walter Scott, 1st Baronet, William Wordsworth, Juliette Récamier, and Gilbert du Motier, Marquis de Lafayette.

Around 1872, the Robinson's came to West Orange, New Jersey, and built a large home next door to General George McClellan. Their 72-acre estate was known as Overlook. As with his other properties, his son inherited Overlook upon his death in 1893.

== Personal life ==
On November 14, 1850, Robinson was married to his second cousin Frances "Fanny" Monroe (1824–1906), the daughter of Elizabeth Mary "Eliza" (née Douglas) Monroe and Col. James Monroe, a Virginian born member of the U.S. House of Representatives from New York who was the nephew of James Monroe, the 5th President of the United States. They were married at Fanwood in Fort Washington, which was then a suburb of New York. Together, they were the parents of two children:

- Douglas Robinson Jr. (1855–1918), who married Corinne Roosevelt (1861–1933), the youngest child of Theodore Roosevelt Sr. and Martha (née Bulloch) Roosevelt. She was also the younger sister of Bamie Roosevelt, President Theodore Roosevelt, and Elliott Bulloch Roosevelt (therefore the aunt of future First Lady, Eleanor Roosevelt).
- Harriet Douglas "Missy" Robinson (1856–1922), who married the Rev. Henry Bazeley Wolryche-Whitmore (1856–1928), an Englishman who was the nephew and heir of William Wolryche-Whitmore, a Member of Parliament who represented Bridgnorth and Wolverhampton.

Robinson died on November 30, 1893, aboard the SS Kaiser Wilhelm II (1889), a Lloyd passenger steamer, while sailing from New York. He was buried at the Robinson Cemetery in Herkimer County, New York. His widow died in Warren, New York in August 1906. In 1908, the Robinson children erected the Jordanville Public Library, designed by New York architects Trowbridge & Livingston, as a memorial to their parents in Jordanville, New York.

=== Descendants ===
Through his son Douglas Jr., he was a grandfather of Theodore Douglas Robinson (1883–1934), a member of the New York State Senate who married his distant cousin, Helen Rebecca Roosevelt, daughter of James Roosevelt Roosevelt and Helen Schermerhorn Astor (a niece of Franklin D. Roosevelt); Corinne Douglas Robinson (1886–1971), a member of the Connecticut House of Representatives who married Joseph Wright Alsop IV; Monroe Douglas Robinson (1887–1944), who married Dorothy Jordan, the granddaughter of Eben Dyer Jordan; and Stewart Douglas Robinson (1889–1909), who died from a fall while a student at Harvard University.

Through his daughter Harriet, he was a grandfather of Frances Sylvia Wolryche-Whitmore (1889–1939), who married the Rev. William Higgin Beauchamp Yerburgh (1885–1937) in 1925; and Ursula Margaret Wolryche-Whitmore, who in 1934 married Sir Oswald Arthur Scott, K.C.M.G. (1893–1960), the U.K. Minister to Finland between 1947 and 1951 and U.K. Ambassador to Peru from 1951 to 1953.
