= Gelston =

Gelston may refer to:

- Gelston, Dumfries and Galloway, a hamlet in Scotland
- Gelston, Lincolnshire, a village in England
- David Gelston (1744–1828), an American merchant and politician
- Gelston Castle in Jordanville, New York, in the United States
- Gelston Castle, a listed building in Kelton, Dumfries and Galloway, in Scotland
