= William Douglas (advocate) =

British Member of Parliament

William Douglas FRSE

Member of Parliament for Plympton Erle
- In office 1812–1816 Serving with Ranald George Macdonald
- Preceded by: Ranald George Macdonald; George Duckett
- Succeeded by: Ranald George Macdonald; Alexander Boswell

Personal details
- Born: c. 1784 Kirkcudbrightshire
- Died: 1821
- Relations: Sir William Douglas, 1st Baronet (uncle); Douglas Robinson Sr. (nephew); Sir William Rose Robinson (nephew)
- Parent(s): James Douglas; Elizabeth Douglas
- Education: Edinburgh High School
- Alma mater: Trinity College, Cambridge

William Douglas of Orchardton and Almorness FRSE (c. 1784 – 1821) was an advocate and a British Member of Parliament in the House of Commons.

== Early life ==
Douglas was born in Kirkcudbrightshire around 1784. He was the son of James Douglas of Orchardton (1747–1821), a Glasgow merchant, and Elizabeth (née Douglas) Stevenson Douglas, who had previously been married to Captain William Stevenson, a distant cousin of his father. Among his siblings were sisters Mary Douglas (wife of William Rose Robinson) and Matilda Douglas (wife of William Maitland).

His paternal grandparents were John Douglas, a Galloway farmer, and Mary (née Heron) Douglas and his maternal grandfather was William Douglas of Worcester. Through his sister, he was uncle to Douglas Robinson Sr. (who married Fanny Monroe, daughter of U.S. Representative James Monroe and a grand-niece of U.S. President James Monroe) and Sir William Robinson, KCSI, who served as acting Governor of Madras.

He was educated at Edinburgh High School and Trinity College, Cambridge.

== Career ==
He was called to the Scottish Bar in 1806. Alongside his uncle, Sir William Douglas of Castle Douglas, he was a partner in the Galloway Banking Co. (Douglas, Napier, & Co), established in Castle Douglas in 1806 and which ceased trading in 1821, because of a bad debt.

He was president of the Speculative Society between 1806 and 1809. An active Christian, he represented his parish as Ruling Elder at the Annual Meeting of the General Assembly of the Church of Scotland in 1811.

Having previously tried for Kirkcudbright, but been rejected, he was subsequently elected as member of Parliament for Plympton Erle from December 1812 to June 1816, during which time he is not known to have spoken, and has just seven recorded votes.

In 1812, he was elected a Fellow of the Royal Society of Edinburgh. His proposers were Thomas Allan, Allan Maconochie, Lord Meadowbank, and John Playfair.

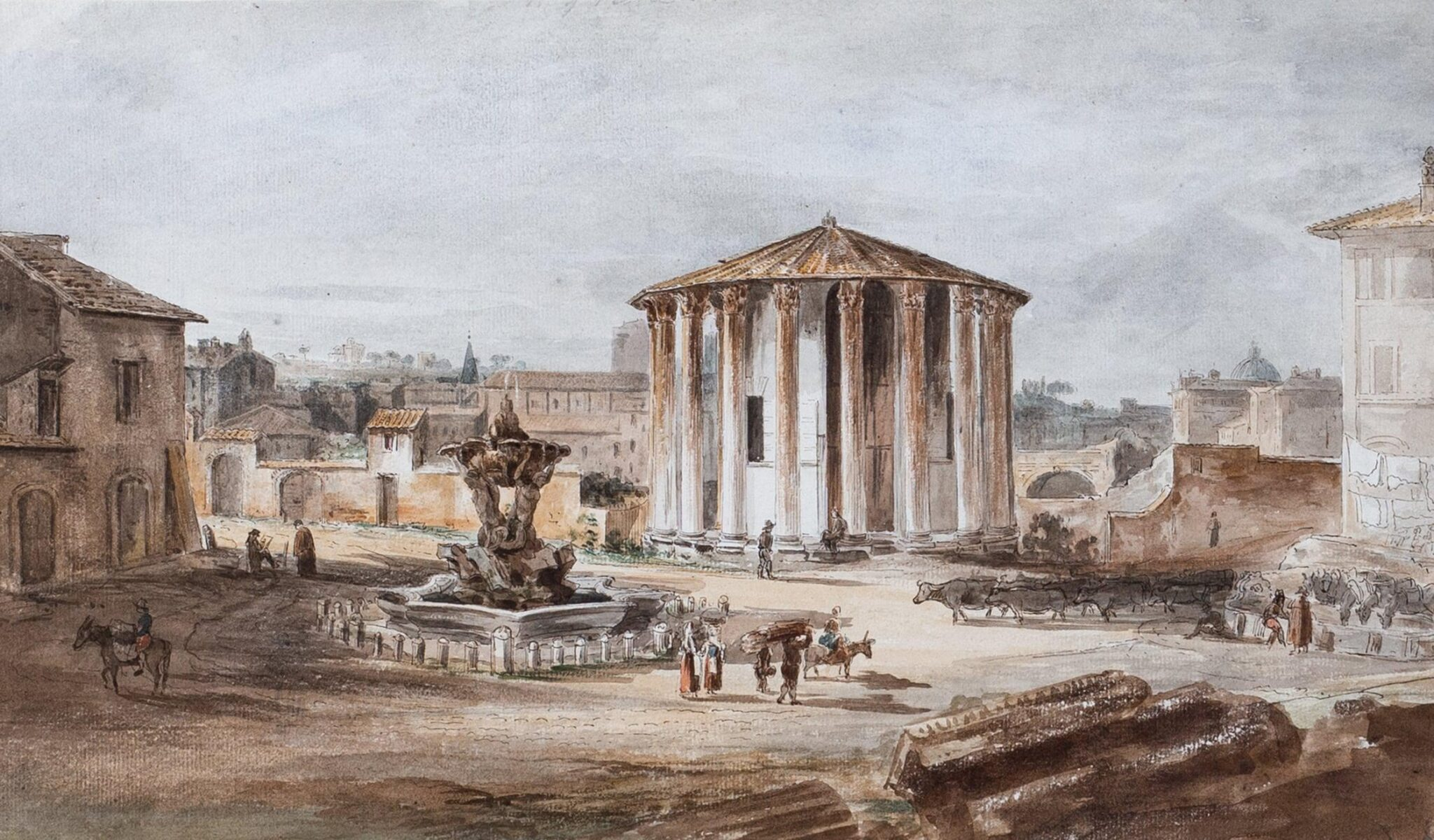
Rome, the Temple of Hercules Victor (circa 1816–1818) by William Douglas. Abbott and Holder say that "The figure seated sketching to the left of the fountain is likely [Hugh William] Williams."

Around 1816–1818, he accompanied the artist Hugh William Williams on a tour of continental Europe, which he (Douglas) funded and during which he also made paintings in his own right.

== Personal life ==
Douglas died unmarried in 1821. Involved in the design of the Douglas Mausoleum in Kelton, near Castle Douglas, he was interred there following his death on 9 July 1821, alongside other family members.

Parliament of the United Kingdom
Preceded by Ranald George Macdonald; George Duckett	Member of Parliament for Plympton Erle; 1812–1816; With: Ranald George Macdonald	Succeeded by Ranald George Macdonald; Alexander Boswell
