= Dorothy Douglas Robinson Kidder =

American philanthropist

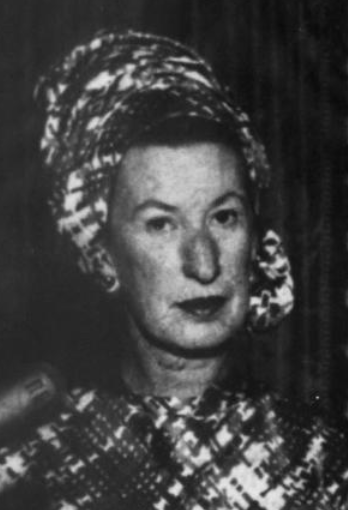
- Dorothy Douglas Robinson Kidder, from a 1967 publication of the US Department of State
- Born: Dorothy Douglas Robinson; June 30, 1917; Manchester, Massachusetts, US
- Died: September 18, 1995 (aged 78); Washington, D.C., US
- Occupation(s): Philanthropist, political hostess
- Spouse: Randolph Appleton Kidder (m. 1938)
- Children: 2
- Relatives: Corinne Alsop Cole (aunt); Eben Jordan (great-grandfather); Alfred V. Kidder (father-in-law); Tristram R. Kidder (nephew); Corinne Robinson (grandmother); Theodore D. Robinson (uncle); Douglas Robinson (grandfather)

Dorothy Douglas Robinson Kidder (June 30, 1917 – September 18, 1995) was an American socialite, philanthropist and political hostess. She was president of the Association of American Foreign Service Women.

== Early life and education ==
Dorothy Douglas Robinson was born in Manchester, Massachusetts, the daughter of Monroe Douglas Robinson and Dorothy M. Jordan Robinson (later Chadwick). Her grandparents included Douglas Robinson Jr. and Corinne Roosevelt Robinson, and her great-grandfather was Boston businessman Eben Dyer Jordan. Her aunt Corinne Alsop Cole and her uncle Theodore Douglas Robinson were both in politics. Her first cousins included journalists Joseph Alsop and Stewart Alsop. Writer Susan Mary Alsop, a relation by marriage, was a close friend and one of her bridesmaids.

Robinson attended the Chapin School in New York and the Foxcroft School in Virginia.

== Personal life ==
Dorothy Douglas Robinson married foreign service officer Randolph Appleton ("Randy") Kidder, son of archaeologist Alfred V. Kidder, in 1938. They had a son, Michael, born in Canada, and a daughter, Charlotte, born in Australia. She died from lung cancer in 1995, aged 78 years, at her home in Washington, D.C. Her memorial service was held at the National Cathedral.

== Career ==
With her diplomat husband, Kidder lived and worked in Canada, Australia, Brazil, Vietnam, and France from 1938 to 1968. Her husband was appointed U.S. Ambassador to Cambodia in 1964, but was not able to serve. She was president of the Association of American Foreign Service Women in the 1960s, and contributed travel, fashion, and interview articles to the Boston Globe, while she was living in Paris in the 1970s.

Kidder's philanthropic efforts focused on the National Gallery of Art, the Smithsonian Institution, the Museum of Modern Art, the National Arboretum, and the Kennedy Center, especially its dance programs. She also founded the Hopeful Fund, to support services for the unhoused population in Washington, D.C.

In June of 1988, Kidder gave an "amusing" oral history interview to the Association for Diplomatic Studies and Training, recounting dances with the Ballets Russes in Sydney, exorcisms in Brazil, and too many gimlets in Saigon, among other adventures. "We had a joint career," she said of her time as a foreign service wife.
