= Governor Robinson =

Governor Robinson may refer to:

- Charles L. Robinson (1818–1894), 1st Governor of Kansas
- Frederick Philipse Robinson (1763–1852), Governor of Tobago from 1816 to 1828
- George Robinson, 1st Marquess of Ripon (1827–1909), Viceroy and Governor-General of India from 1880 to 1884
- George D. Robinson (1834–1896), 34th Governor of Massachusetts
- Hercules Robinson, 1st Baron Rosmead (1824–1897), 5th Governor of Hong Kong, the 14th Governor of New South Wales, 1st Governor of Fiji, and 8th Governor of New Zealand
- James Fisher Robinson (1800–1882), 22nd Governor of Kentucky
- James L. Robinson (1838–1887), Acting Governor of North Carolina in 1883
- John S. Robinson (governor) (1804–1860), 22nd Governor of Vermont, grandson of Moses Robinson
- Joseph Taylor Robinson (1872–1937), 23rd Governor of Arkansas
- Lucius Robinson (1810–1891), 26th Governor of New York
- Moses Robinson (1741–1813), 2nd Governor of the Vermont Republic
- Robert P. Robinson (Delaware politician) (1869–1939), 57th Governor of Delaware
- Roland Robinson, 1st Baron Martonmere (1907–1989), Governor of Bermuda from 1964 to 1972
- William C. F. Robinson (1834–1897), 11th Governor of South Australia
- William Robinson (colonial administrator, born 1836) (1836–1912), 11th Governor of Hong Kong
- William Rose Robinson (1822–1886), Acting Governor of Madras in 1875
