= Douglas Robinson Jr. =

American businessman (1855–1918)

Douglas Robinson
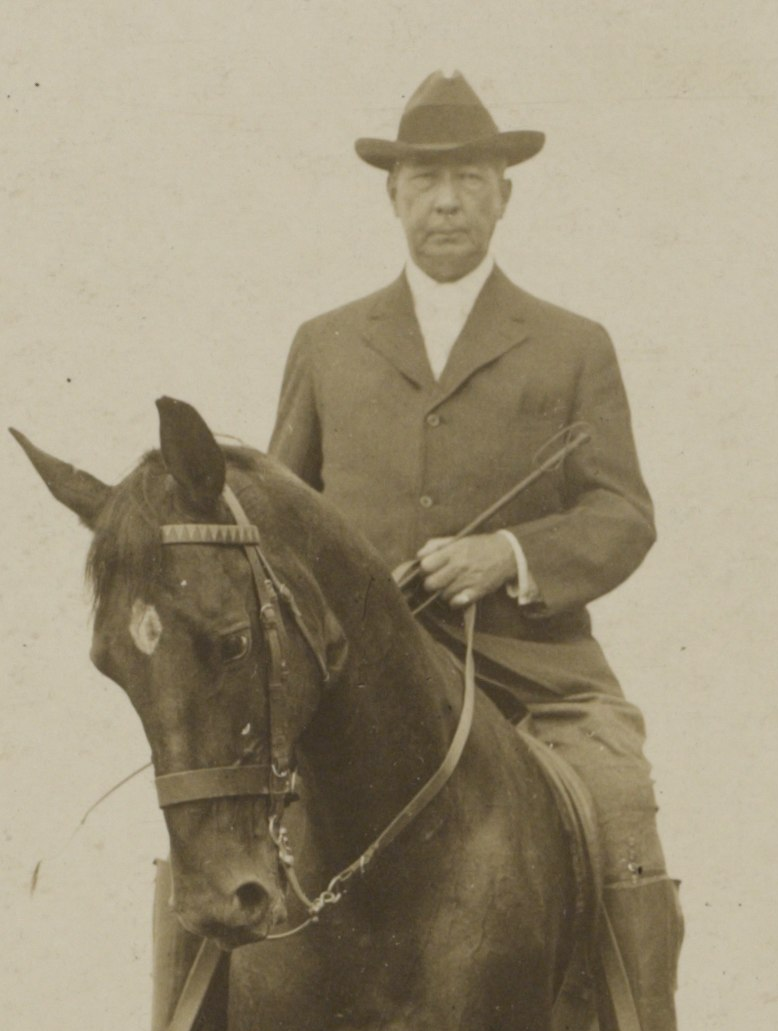
- Robinson in 1910
- Born: January 3, 1855; Edinburgh, Scotland, U.K.
- Died: September 12, 1918 (aged 63); Amsterdam, New York, U.S.
- Education: Oxford University
- Spouse: Corinne Roosevelt (m. 1882)
- Children: 4, including Theodore and Corinne
- Parent(s): Douglas Robinson Sr. Frances Monroe
- Relatives: Joseph Alsop (grandson); Stewart Alsop (grandson)

Douglas Robinson Jr. (January 3, 1855 – September 12, 1918) was an American businessman who was married to Corinne Roosevelt, a sister of U.S. President Theodore Roosevelt and an aunt of First Lady Eleanor Roosevelt.

== Early life ==
Robinson was born on January 3, 1855, in Edinburgh, Scotland, to Douglas Robinson Sr. (1824–1893) and Frances "Fanny" (née Monroe) Robinson (1824–1906). He had one sister, Harriet Douglas "Missy" Robinson, who married an Englishman, the Rev. Henry Bazeley Wolryche-Whitmore, an heir and nephew of William Wolryche-Whitmore, a Member of Parliament who represented Bridgnorth and Wolverhampton in the House of Commons.

Robinson's maternal grandparents were Elizabeth Mary "Eliza" (née Douglas) Monroe and James Monroe, a Virginian born member of the U.S. House of Representatives from New York who was the nephew of 5th President James Monroe. His paternal grandparents were William Rose Robinson and Mary (née Douglas) Robinson, who resided in Scotland.

Robinson graduated from Oxford University in Oxford in 1876.

== Career ==
Robinson was a prominent real estate broker and considered "one of the leading figures in New York City realty transactions." He served as president of Douglas Robinson, Charles S. Brown Company and the Douglas Land Company.

Following the Panic of 1907, he was appointed one of the receivers of the Metropolitan Street Railway Company in 1908.

He served as a board member for numerous banks, insurance companies and other corporations including the Atlantic Mutual Insurance Company, the Equitable Life Assurance Company and the Astor Trust Company.

=== Society life ===
In 1892, Robinson, his wife, and father were all included in Ward McAllister's "Four Hundred", purported to be an index of New York's best families, published in The New York Times. Conveniently, 400 was the number of people that could fit into Mrs. Astor's ballroom. He was a member of the University Club, the Riding Club, the Downtown Club and the Essex Country Club in West Orange, New Jersey.

In 1893, upon the death of his father, he inherited Overlook, his father's 72 acre estate in West Orange, New Jersey. While originally only a weekend home, the Robinsons moved to West Orange and Overlook became their primary residence between the years 1894 and 1911. His wife hosted lavish parties at their home where she was known as "Queen of the Orange Mountain." In 1898, at one such Christmas party for the Roosevelt family, Overlook played host for the first dance and beginning romance between their niece Eleanor and distant cousin Franklin Roosevelt.

== Personal life ==
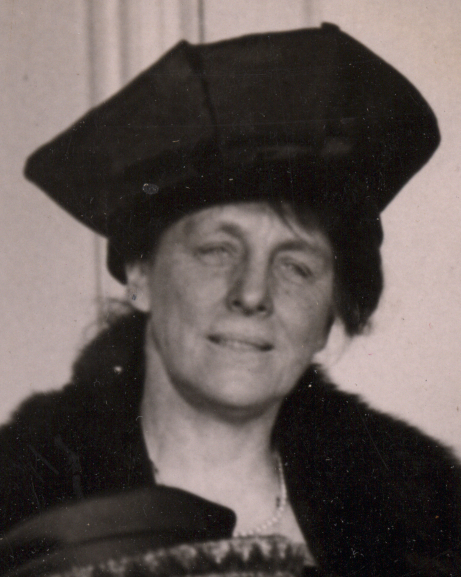
His wife Corinne Roosevelt

On April 29, 1882, he married his friend Elliott Roosevelt's sister, Corinne Roosevelt (1861–1933) at the Fifth Avenue Presbyterian Church. Corinne was the youngest child of Theodore Roosevelt Sr. and Martha (née Bulloch) Roosevelt. She was the younger sister of Bamie Roosevelt, President Theodore Roosevelt, and Elliott Roosevelt (therefore the aunt of future First Lady, Eleanor Roosevelt). The Robinson's had a home in New York City at 147 East 61st Street, as well as a country home, known as Gelston Castle, in Mohawk near Jordanville, New York. Together, they were the parents of four children:

- Theodore Douglas Robinson (1883–1934), a member of the New York State Senate who married his distant cousin, Helen Rebecca Roosevelt (1881–1962), daughter of James Roosevelt "Rosey" Roosevelt and Helen Schermerhorn Astor of the Astor family, and half-niece of Franklin Delano Roosevelt
- Corinne Douglas Robinson (1886–1971), a member of the Connecticut House of Representatives who married Joseph Wright Alsop IV (1876–1953).
- Monroe Douglas Robinson (1887–1944), who married Dorothy Jordan, the daughter of merchant Eben D. Jordan and granddaughter of Eben Dyer Jordan.
- Stewart Douglas Robinson (1889–1909), who died from a fall while a student at Harvard University.

Robinson died suddenly and unexpectedly on September 12, 1918, in Amsterdam, New York. His funeral was held at his "Scottish Castle" country home, Henderson House, followed by a burial at the Robinson Cemetery in Herkimer County, New York. His widow died of pneumonia on February 17, 1933, age 71 in New York City. The bulk of her estate was divided among her three surviving children with smaller bequests made to grandchildren, nephews, friends and institutions. She left all real and personal property she had received from her uncle, Cornelius V. S. Roosevelt to her daughter, Corrine. The household furniture, residue of the property, including $30,000 left to her by another uncle, James King Gracie, was to be shared equally among her children.

=== Descendants ===
Through his eldest son Theodore, he was the grandfather of Douglas Robinson (1906–1964), inherited a portrait of Harriet Douglas, sister-in-law of James Monroe, painted by Sir William Beechey.

Through his only daughter Corinne, he was the grandfather of columnists Joseph Wright Alsop V (1910–1989) and Stewart Johonnot Oliver Alsop (1914–1974).

Through his son Monroe, he was the grandfather of Dorothy Douglas Robinson (1917–1995), who married Randolph Appleton Kidder (1913–1996), the son of archaeologist Alfred Vincent Kidder, in 1938. Her husband later served as U.S. Ambassador to Cambodia.
