= Foxcroft School =

Girls prep school in Middleburg, Virginia, US

Coordinates: 39°0′42.9″N 77°45′10.3″W

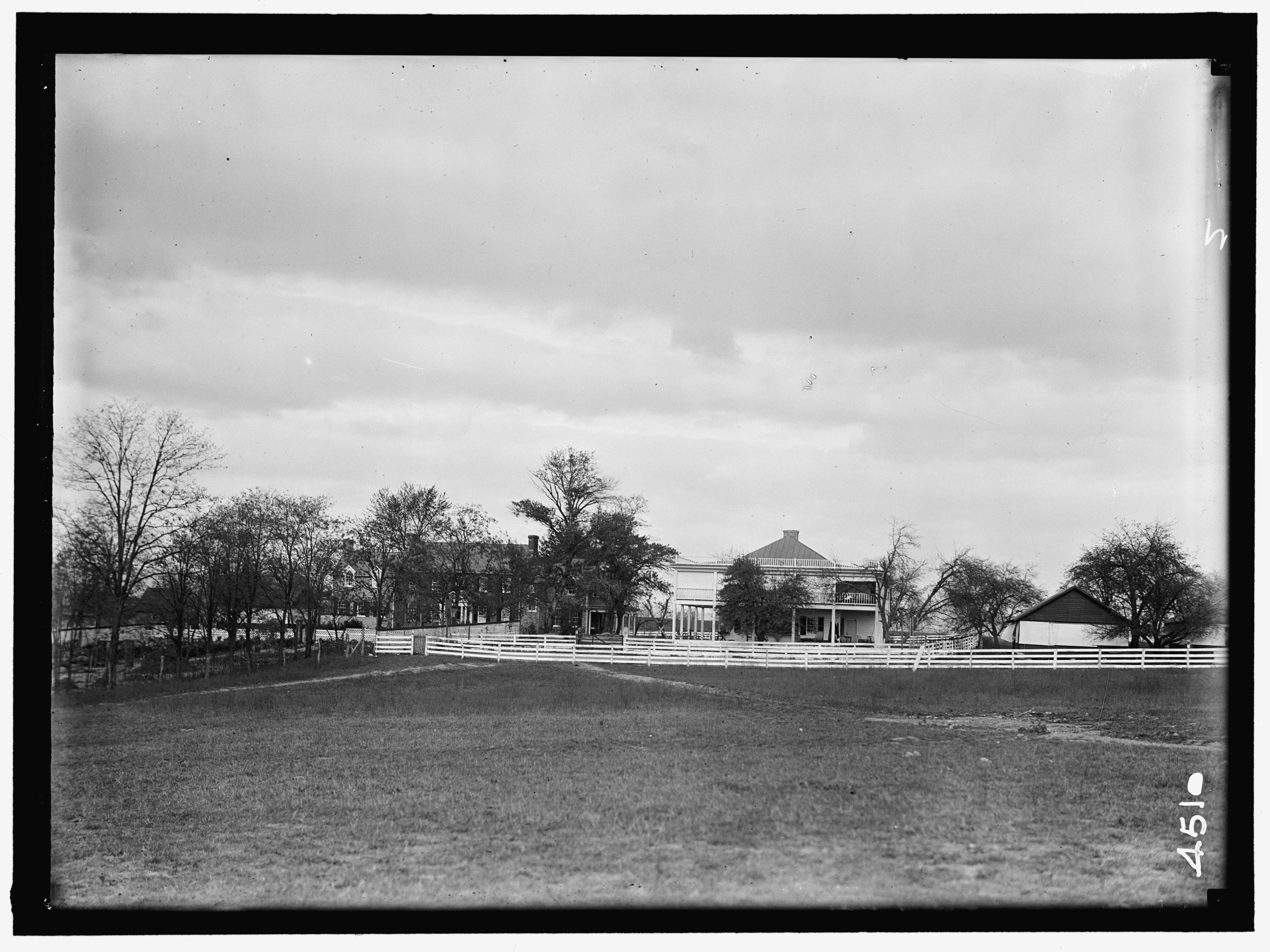
- Foxcroft Boarding School in 1914

Location
- 22407 Foxhound Lane; Middleburg, Virginia 20117; United States

Information
- School type: Private female boarding school
- Motto: Latin: "Mens Sana in Corpore Sano" (A Healthy Mind in a Healthy Body)
- Founded: 1914
- Founder: Charlotte Haxall Noland
- Head of School: Dr. Lisa Kaenzig
- Grades: 9–12
- Enrollment: 161 (2025-26)
- Campus: 500 acres (2.0 km^{2})
- Colors: Green and White
- Accreditation: Virginia Association of Independent Schools; National Association of Independent Schools
- Publication: Chimera
- Yearbook: Tally-Ho!
- Endowment: approx. ~$95 million
- Website: Official Site

Foxcroft School, founded in 1914 by Charlotte Haxall Noland, is a college-preparatory boarding and day school for girls in grades 9-12 & PG, located near Middleburg, Virginia, United States.

In its century of existence, Foxcroft has educated the daughters of corporate titans and congressmen, including women from the Rockefeller, Carnegie, Roosevelt, Mellon, du Pont, Auchincloss and Astor families. It is accredited by the Virginia Association of Independent Schools and the National Association of Independent Schools, and is a founding member of the International Coalition of Girls' Schools.

Foxcroft’s mission is "to help every girl explore her unique voice and to develop the skills, confidence, and courage to share it with the world".

== Campus ==
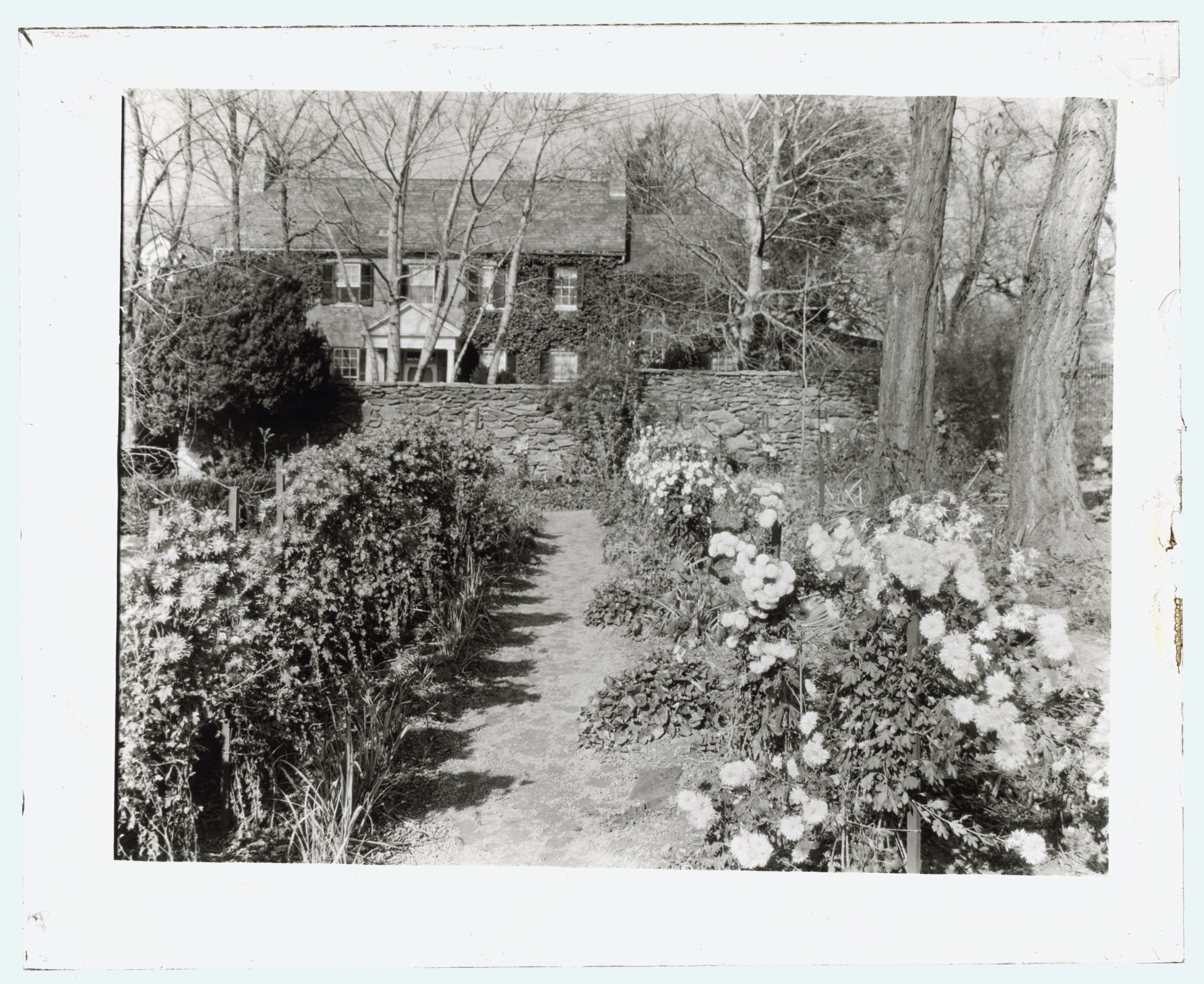
Miss Charlotte's Garden at Foxcroft

=== Academic facilities ===
Schoolhouse is the main academic building on campus which houses a majority of the classes. The two wings on either side of the building house the visual arts department and the theatre. In January 2026, Foxcroft opened its newest academic facility, the Mars STEAM Building.

=== Mars STEAM Building ===
The two-story, nearly 18,000-square-foot Mars STEAM Building houses biology, chemistry, and physics labs; two STEAM classrooms; student project spaces, an over 1,700 square foot garden with an outdoor blackboard and composting bins all accessible to the biology lab; a completely modernized dark room outfitted with dry and wet labs; a construction shop with machinery for engineering projects; a finishing shop with a painting spray booth and an electric drying cabinet to put the final touches on projects; and more. The Mars STEAM Building is the latest project in the Building for Our Future Campaign. In 2023, four Foxcroft alumnae from the Mars family — sisters Victoria Beth Mars ’74 and Pamela Mars Wright ’78, and their daughters Bernadette Victoria Russell ’03 and Charlotte Audrey Rossetter ’12 — gifted the School an extraordinary $22 million to launch the construction of the building. The Mars STEAM building officially opened for classes in January 2026.

=== Library ===
The Audrey Bruce Currier Library, named after alumna Audrey Bruce, daughter of David K. Bruce and Ailsa Mellon Bruce, sits in the center of the campus and is home to additional classrooms, meeting spaces, and the Learning Center. The library is also the gathering space for the bi-weekly assemblies known as "Morning Meeting."

=== Athletics facilities ===
A new Athletic/Student Center was built in 2010, housing a multi-purpose double-box gym (Leipheimer Gym). While commonly used for basketball and volleyball, it is frequently converted to indoor practice spaces for field hockey, tennis, and lacrosse. Encircling the top of the double-box is a two-lane track, around which various exercise machines sit. The competition gymnasium, or the Engelhard, is housed in the same Athletic/Student Center. In addition to the gyms, the student lounge (Roomies), complete with a full kitchen, is in the same building. A weight-room with treadmills and ellipticals, plus an athletic trainer and athletic training room complete the Athletic/Student Center. The outdoor athletic facilities include a recreational-sized pool, eight tennis courts, two softball diamonds (one turf, one dirt), two full-sized turf fields, and an outdoor two-lane track.

=== The Stables ===
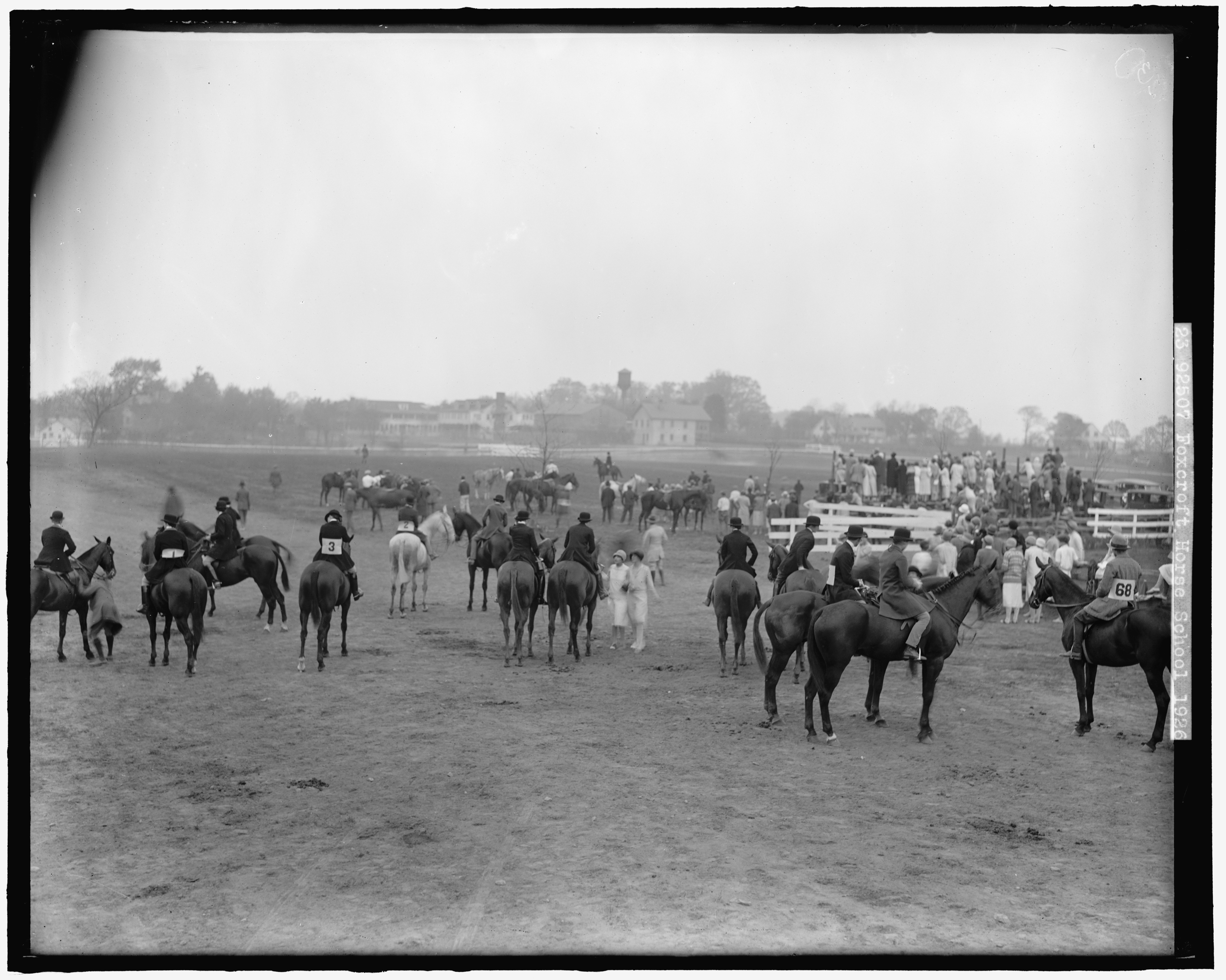
Foxcroft Horse Show

Foxcroft School has stables on campus. The Jean du Pont McConnell Stables house around sixty horses, both school-owned and privately owned. An indoor ring (dimensions: 100x200) is connected to the stables as well. Outdoors, the grassy expanse of Big Track contains a 140' x 215' outdoor riding arena and is well-suited for cross-country riding and practice. Students can also use miles of trails to ride or run on. The horses are housed in the stables during the day and turned out, either individually or in groups at night.

=== Dormitories ===
The campus has five student dorms, including one freshman dorm. The remaining dorms have a mix of sophomores, juniors, and senior dorm leaders (prefects). Every year, all the dorms compete in Battle of the Dorms, where groups put on skits and the like. Based on early-1900 sleeping porches, also known as "cold rooms," several of the dorms maintain communal style sleeping areas lined with beds. Once fully open air, they are now enclosed with windows and screens for the safety and comfort of the students.

== Ruth T. Bedford Scholarships ==
In the fall of 2014, Standard Oil heiress Ruth T. Bedford, a member of the class of 1932, unexpectedly donated $40 million to the school in her will.

A year later, the school announced the establishment of the Ruth T. Bedford ’32 Merit Scholarship for the Arts, which is open only to external applicants wishing to join the school. Up to eight students receive $25,000 a year each, and beneficiaries need to share Ruth T. Bedford’s sense of adventure and enterprise as well as her passion for the arts.

== Fox/Hound Tradition ==
During World War I, students at Foxcroft were not allowed to return home. To cope, the founder of the school, Miss Charlotte, started a now long-standing tradition called "Fox/Hound," as a way for the girls to spend their time. The entirety of the school, including the teachers, are split up into two teams, the Foxes and the Hounds. The teams rival each other in three sports competitions; Field Hockey (fall), Basketball (winter), and Horseback Riding (spring). Each year, the Battle for the Cup is renewed, and the teams compete for the cup which is earned from a victory in the Big Team Basketball game.

Team tryouts and practices begin in the two weeks leading up to the competitions. Team captains are chosen and they spend time making gifts for their team members. The week leading up to each competition is filled with pep-rallies, known as "Sing Sings" as a way to encourage each team for a victory. On the Thursday before the competitions, the officers and mascots from each team decorate Schoolhouse, the academic building. One side of Schoolhouse is designated for the Foxes, and the other for the Hounds.

The spirit central to the Fox/Hound tradition is "true friends 'till the end."

== Notable alumnae ==
- Anne Armstrong, diplomat and politician
- Jane Forbes Clark, president and trustee of the United States Equestrian Team Foundation; chairman of the National Baseball Hall of Fame
- Annette de la Renta, philanthropist and socialite
- Frances FitzGerald, Pulitzer Prize-winning writer
- Nina Fout, Olympic equestrian
- Olivia Stokes Hatch, socialite and American Red Cross volunteer
- Dorothy Douglas Robinson Kidder, socialite, philanthropist, political hostess
- Diana Walker, Time magazine White House photographer
- Gertrude Sanford Legendre, socialite & World War II spy
- Ruth du Pont Lord, psychotherapist, writer, and arts patron
- Pamela Mars-Wright, former chairwoman of the board, Mars, Incorporated
- Cordelia Scaife May, philanthropist
- Mary McFadden, art collector, editor, fashion designer, and writer.
- Rachel Lambert Mellon ("Bunny"), heiress, horticulturalist, creator of the White House Rose Garden
- Elizabeth Meyer, equestrian
- Sister Parish, interior decorator and socialite
- Ursula Plassnik, Austrian diplomat and politician (exchange student 1971-1972)
- Patsy Pulitzer (1928–2011), model, socialite and philanthropist
- Keshia Knight Pulliam, actress, The Cosby Show
- Mary Todhunter Clark Rockefeller, first wife of Nelson Rockefeller
- Kay Sage, Surrealist artist and poet
- Christine Todd Whitman, former head of the EPA, former Governor of New Jersey
- Mollie Wilmot, philanthropist and socialite
- Flora Payne Whitney, artist, art collector, socialite, member of the Whitney family and Vanderbilt family
- Stephanie Zimbalist, actress, Remington Steele
- Millicent Fenwick, former congresswoman
