= Frederick W. Kavanaugh =

American politician and businessman from New York

Member of the New York State Senate from the 32nd district
- In office January 1, 1921 – December 31, 1924
- Preceded by: James W. Yelverton
- Succeeded by: Thomas C. Brown

Personal details
- Born: Frederick William Kavanaugh; September 10, 1871 Waterford, New York, U.S.
- Died: December 2, 1940 (aged 69) Waterford, New York, U.S.
- Cause of death: Suicide by gunshot
- Party: Republican
- Spouse: Lillian May LeRoy (m. 1891)
- Children: 2
- Relatives: George W. Kavanaugh (brother)
- Occupation: Politician, businessman

Frederick William Kavanaugh (September 10, 1871 – December 2, 1940) was an American businessman and politician from New York. He served on the New York State Senate.

== Early life ==
Kavanaugh was born September 10, 1871 in Waterford, Saratoga County, New York. He was the son of Luke Kavanaugh (born 1830 in Dublin) and Mary Monaghan. Assemblyman George W. Kavanaugh (born c. 1863) was his brother.

== Career ==
Kavanaugh was supervisor of the Town of Waterford in 1903. He was the sheriff of Saratoga County, New York from 1904 to 1906.

Kavanaugh was a member of the New York State Senate (32nd D.) from 1921 to 1924, sitting in the 144th, 145th, 146th and 147th New York State Legislatures. He was a Republican.

== Personal life ==
On December 9, 1891, he married Lillian May LeRoy (1871–1921), and they had two children. He killed himself on December 2, 1940, at his home in Waterford, New York, by shooting himself.

New York State Senate
Preceded by James W. Yelverton	New York State Senate; 32nd District; 1921–1924	Succeeded by Thomas C. Brown
