= Ranald George Macdonald =

Scottish clan chief and Member of Parliament (1788–1873)

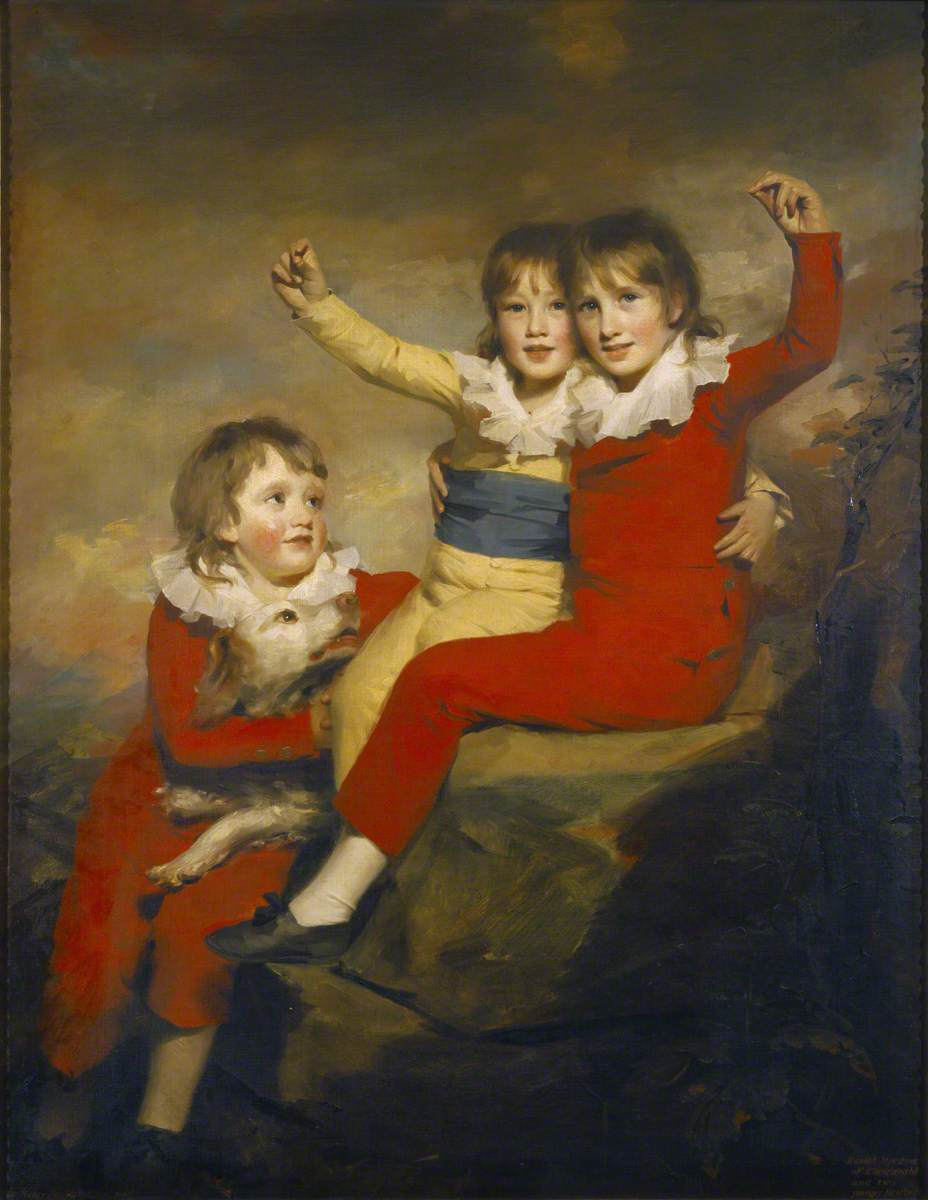
- Ranald (right) and his brothers Robert and Donald in childhood, portrait by Henry Raeburn

Chief of Clanranald
- In office 1810–1873

Member of the British Parliament for Plympton Erle
- In office 1812–1824

Personal details
- Born: 29 August 1788
- Died: 11 March 1873
- Spouses: Caroline Anne Edgcumbe; Anne Selby Cunninghame; Elizabeth Rebecca Newman
- Children: 6, including Reginald Macdonald

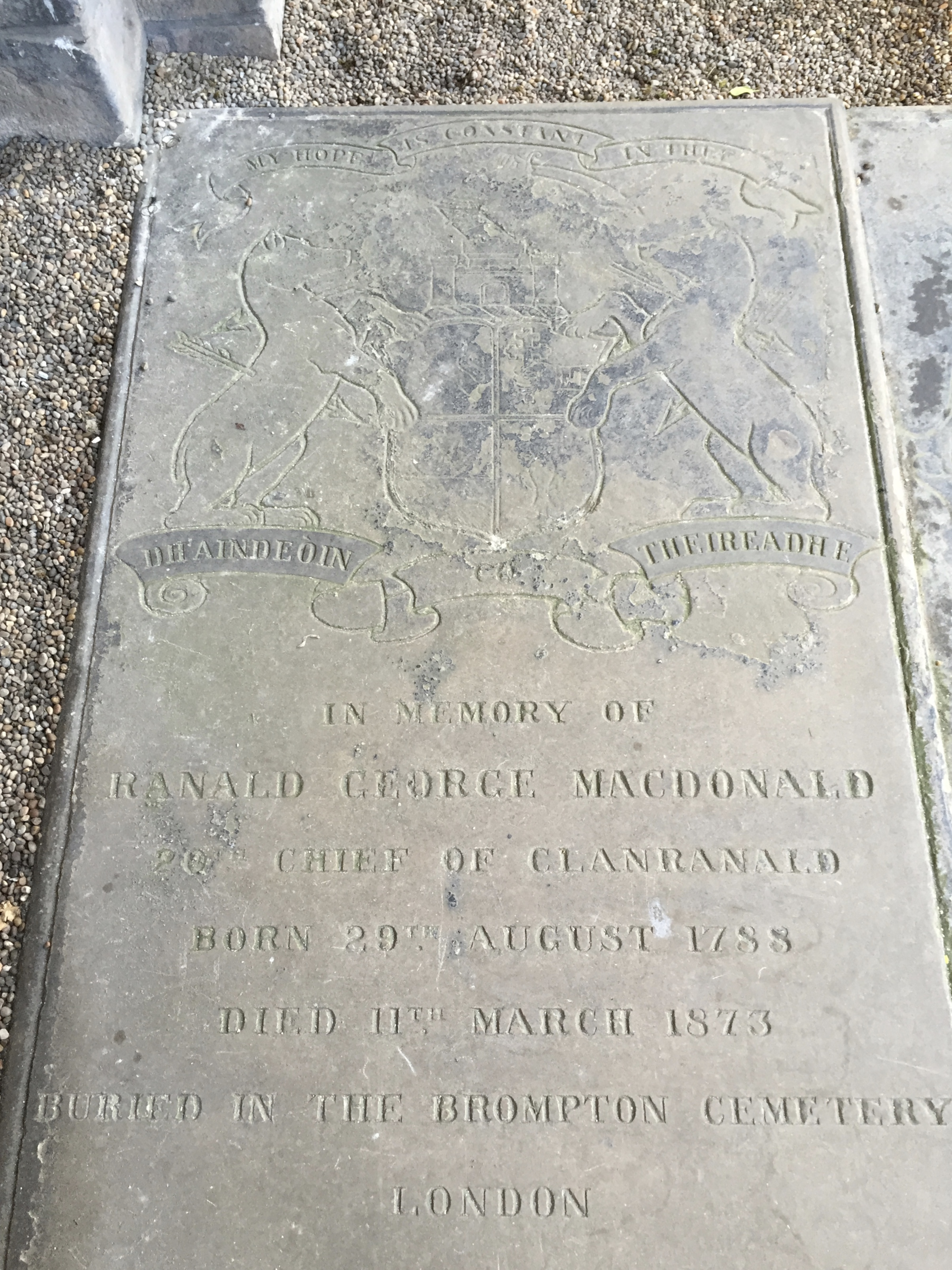
Memorial to Ranald George MacDonald in Holyrood Abbey

Ranald George Macdonald (29 August 1788 – 11 March 1873) was a Scottish clan chief and Member of Parliament.

Macdonald was the son of John Macdonald, 19th Chief of Clanranald, by Katherine, the daughter of Robert McQueen, Lord Braxfield.

He became the 20th Chief of Clanranald. He married Caroline Anne, daughter of Richard Edgcumbe, 2nd Earl of Mount Edgcumbe, on 13 February 1812 and had issue.

He was elected to Parliament for Plympton Erle on 10 October 1812 and sat until 1824. In 1824 Alexander Ranaldson MacDonell of Glengarry unsuccessfully attempted to deprive Macdonald of the chiefship of Clan Donald by bringing an action in the Court of Session.

Between 1813 and 1838, Clanranald sold almost the entirety of his estates. He attributed his financial misfortune to peculation on the part of his trustees. However, the historical consensus has been that his ruin resulted primarily from his folly and extravagance.

Parliament of the United Kingdom
Preceded by Viscount Castlereagh; Henry Drummond	Member of Parliament for Plympton Erle; 1812–1824; With: George Duckett 1812; William Douglas 1812–1816; Alexander Boswell 1816–1821; William Gill Paxton from 1821	Succeeded by John Henry North; William Gill Paxton
