= Corinne Roosevelt Robinson =

American poet (1861–1933)

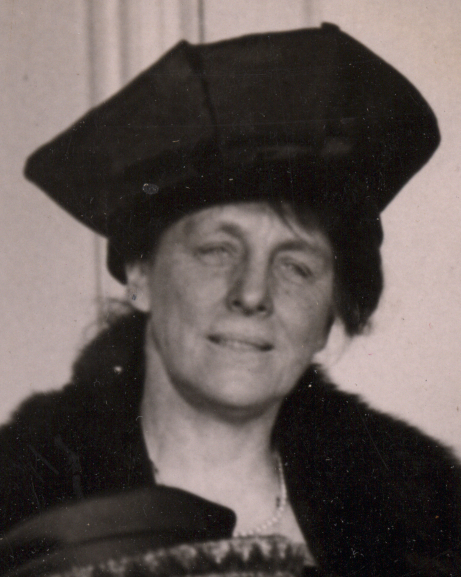
- Robinson c. 1921
- Born: Corinne Roosevelt; September 27, 1861; New York City, U.S.
- Died: February 17, 1933 (aged 71); New York City, New York, U.S.
- Burial place: Robinson Cemetery, Columbia Center, Herkimer County, New York, U.S.
- Political party: Republican
- Spouse: Douglas Robinson Jr. (m. 1882; died 1918)
- Children: 4
- Parent(s): Theodore Roosevelt Sr. Martha Stewart Bulloch
- Family: Roosevelt family

Corinne Roosevelt Robinson (September 27, 1861 – February 17, 1933) was an American poet, writer and lecturer. She was also the younger sister of President of the United States Theodore Roosevelt and an aunt of First Lady of the United States, Eleanor Roosevelt.

== Early years ==
Corinne Roosevelt was born on September 27, 1861, at 28 East 20th Street in New York City, the fourth and youngest child of businessman/philanthropist Theodore Roosevelt Sr. and socialite Martha Stewart "Mittie" Bulloch. Her siblings were Anna, Theodore Jr. (who became president), and Elliott (the father of future First Lady of the United States Anna Eleanor Roosevelt). As an Oyster Bay Roosevelt Corinne was a descendant of the Schuyler family. She received most of her education from private tutors.

Corinne was best friends with Edith Kermit Carow, her brother Theodore Roosevelt's second wife and later the First Lady of the United States. Theodore Sr. was a supporter of the North during the Civil War, while Mittie supported the South. Mittie's home state was Georgia, and she had moved to New York only because of her marriage to Theodore. Mittie's brothers were members of the Confederate Navy. However, the conflict between Corinne's parents' political loyalties did not prevent her from experiencing a privileged childhood, including the best schools and regular travel, or the formal debut into society expected of the daughters of prominent families.

== Career ==
Robinson began writing at an early age, through the encouragement of her friends, in particular Edith Wharton who helped critique her poetry. In 1911, Robinson published her first poem, "The Call of Brotherhood", in Scribner's Magazine. Her first book of poems of the same title was published in 1912. This volume was quickly followed by One Woman to Another and Other Poems (1914) dedicated to her daughter, also named Corinne, commemorating the loss of Robinson's brother Elliott and son, Stewart.

Other volumes of poetry by Robinson include Service and Sacrifice (1919) dedicated to her brother Theodore Roosevelt, The Poems of Corinne Roosevelt Robinson (1924), and Out of Nymph (1930) dedicated to Charles Scribner. She also wrote the prose memoir My Brother Theodore Roosevelt (1924).

=== Political career ===
Robinson was a member of the executive committee of the Republican National Committee and the New York State Republican Committee. During the election of 1920, Robinson became the first woman ever called upon to second the nomination of a national party convention candidate; speaking before a crowd of 14,000, she endorsed General Leonard Wood as the 1920 Republican candidate for president. After Wood lost the nomination to Harding, Robinson came out strongly for Harding and his vice-presidential candidate, Calvin Coolidge. In the 1924 election, she served as a member of Coolidge's advisory committee. Also in 1924, she wrote a letter to The New York Times commenting on the election loss of her nephew, Theodore Roosevelt Jr., for Governor of New York.

Despite being a prominent Republican, Corinne voted for her fifth cousin and nephew-in-law Franklin when he ran for Governor of New York in 1928, and in 1932 when he was elected President of the United States. During the 1932 election, she declined the designation of a Republican elector-at-large, and wrote to Franklin saying that she had refused to take an active part in the campaign. She also stated that:

You must understand why I cannot comment on the national campaign. My own beloved niece is the wife of the Democratic candidate. She is the daughter of the brother who was nearer to me in age than Theodore. For her I have the deepest affection and respect. So, much as I would like to pay the highest tribute to President Hoover, I cannot do so in this campaign.

== Personal life ==
On April 29, 1882, she married Douglas Robinson Jr. (1855–1918), son of Douglas Robinson Sr. and Frances (née Monroe) Robinson at the Fifth Avenue Presbyterian Church. Robinson's maternal grandfather, James Monroe (1799–1870), a member of the House of Representatives, was a nephew of U.S. President James Monroe (1758–1831). Their marriage produced four children:

- Theodore Douglas Robinson (1883–1934), a member of the New York State Senate who married his distant cousin, Helen Rebecca Roosevelt (1881–1962), daughter of James Roosevelt "Rosey" Roosevelt (1854–1927) and Helen Schermerhorn Astor (1855–1893) of the Astor family, and half-niece of Franklin Delano Roosevelt
- Corinne Douglas Robinson (1886–1971), a member of the Connecticut House of Representatives.
- Monroe Douglas Robinson (1887–1944) who married Dorothy Jordan, the daughter of merchant Eben D. Jordan and granddaughter of Eben Dyer Jordan.
- Stewart Douglas Robinson (1889–1909), who died after falling out of his college dormitory window after sustaining a head injury at a party.

Throughout the 1920s, Robinson's health failed her a number of times and she had a total of sixteen eye surgeries.

Robinson died on February 17, 1933, age 71, of pneumonia, in New York City, less than a month before Franklin was inaugurated as president. Her funeral was held at St. Bartholomew's Protestant Episcopal Church and was attended by more than 1,000 people, including President-elect Roosevelt, Eleanor Roosevelt, Sara Roosevelt, Anna Roosevelt, and Curtis B. Dall. The bulk of her estate was divided among her three surviving children with smaller bequests made to grandchildren, nephews, friends and institutions. She left all real and personal property she had received from her uncle, Cornelius V. S. Roosevelt to her daughter, Corinne. The household furniture, residue of the property, including $30,000 left to her by another uncle, James King Gracie (1840–1903), was to be shared equally among her children. A portrait of Harriet Douglas (1790–1872), sister-in-law of James Monroe, painted by Sir William Beechey, was left to her grandson, Douglas Robinson (1906–1964), of whom Harriet was his great-great-great aunt.

A memorial was held for her by the Women's Roosevelt Memorial Association, of which she was a director, at Roosevelt House at 28 East 20th Street. The benediction was pronounced by the Rev. Dr. Henry Sloane Coffin. The Association also planned a memorial fund in her honor to augment the Roosevelt endowment fund for the preservation of the Roosevelt House. In 1942, two oriental plane trees were planted in front of the Roosevelt House and dedicated to the memory of Anna Roosevelt Cowles and Corinne.

=== Residences and clubs ===
Robinson, who was born at the Roosevelt House at 28 East 20th Street in New York City, had her own home in New York City at 147 East 61st Street, as well as a country home called Gelston Castle in Mohawk near Jordanville, New York where she cultivated her interest in flowers.

In 1925, she leased her former home, 422 and 424 Madison Avenue, a five-story building adjoining the southwest corner of 49th Street, to Bernard A. Ottenberg and Roy Foster for a period of 80 years with annual rent of about $25,000 a year for the first 20 years. At the time, the entire building was occupied by the Braus Art Galleries. After the expiration of the Braus lease, the new lessees planned to construct a nine-story store and loft building with foundations for twelve to fifteen stories.

She was a member of the Colony Club, Cosmopolitan Club, Women's National Republican Club, Town Hall Club, MacDowell Club and Essex Country Club.

=== Descendants ===
Robinson was the grandmother of columnists Joseph Wright Alsop V (1910–1989) and Stewart Johonnot Oliver Alsop (1914–1974).

== Some published works ==
- The Call of Brotherhood (1912) (poetry)
- One Woman to Another and Other Poems (1914) (poetry)
- Service and Sacrifice (1919) (poetry)
- The Poems of Corinne Roosevelt Robinson (1924) (poetry)
- Out of Nymph (1930) (poetry) dedicated to Charles Scribner
- My Brother Theodore Roosevelt (1924) Biography of her brother Theodore Roosevelt
- My Brother The 26 (1932) (poetry)

== Sources ==
- Howard Hilles-Corinne Roosevelt Robinson Collection – Special Collections – University Libraries at www.wmich.edu
