= John J. Mackrell =

American lawyer and politician

John Joseph Mackrell (March 29, 1879 – August 31, 1961) was an American lawyer and politician from New York.

== Life ==
Mackrell was born on March 29, 1879, in Lansingburgh, New York, the son of John Mackrell and Ellen Egan. His father died when he was one.

Mackrell attended St. Augustine's Academy, Powers School, and then St. Augustine's Academy again, graduating from there in 1897. From the age of 12 to his graduation, he spent his vacations working on farms, as a collar express operator for Eugene Morris, for the United Shirt and Collar Company, the Holmes and Ide Collar Company, the Madden Lumber Company, the Morrison Brush Company, and the Lansingburg Forge Works. After graduating, he began studying law in the office of Farrell & Finder in Troy. While studying law, he worked for the Trojan Clothing Company and shoe store owners A. T. Small and W. A. Dorrance. He also worked as manager of a daily reporting financial agency. He was admitted to the bar in 1901, and after recovering from an illness for several months he worked with the law firm Farrell & Finder. In 1904, he opened a law office in Troy. He practiced law on his own until 1923, when he formed a partnership with Charles J. Ranney called Mackrell & Ranney.

As a young man, Mackrell unsuccessfully ran for the New York State Assembly, losing the election to John M. Chambers. In 1904, Troy mayor Joseph F. Hogan appointed him examiner of election officials, an office he held until Elias P. Mann became mayor in 1906. In 1909, he unsuccessfully ran for Justice of the City Court. In 1911, he was elected president of the Common Council, an office he held for four years. In 1918, he was elected to the New York State Senate as a Democrat, representing New York's 31st State Senate district (Rensselaer County). He served in the Senate in 1919 and 1920. While in the Senate, he sponsored and supported bills that made the Congress Street Bridge and the Greenbush Bridge free, to reconstruct the destroyed Cohoes-Lansingburg Bridge, and to increase teachers' salary. He was appointed to a committee that investigated state-wide teachers' salary conditions, and as a member of the judiciary committee he investigated the charge Senator George L. Thompson was offered a $500,000 bribe. In 1921, he was elected chairman of the Democratic City Committee of Troy, and in that office served as the personal manager of James W. Fleming's successful mayoral campaign. In 1923, he unsuccessfully ran for mayor of Troy, losing to Harry E. Clinton.

Mackrell served as Deputy Secretary of State of New York from 1923 to 1924. In 1928, he became Corporation Counsel for Troy. He was attorney for Metropolitan Life Insurance Company and the Troy Fifth Ave. Bus Co., Inc. At some point, he became senior member of the law firm Mackrell, Ranney and Rommel. He served as vice-president of the New York State Bar Association and was on important committees in the Association for a number of years. He served on the Lansingburg board of education for 12 years. During World War II, he was chairman of the legal board of the local Selective Service Board.

Mackrell was the first president of the Lansingburg Playgrounds Association, president of the Laureate Boat Club, and grand knight of the Knights of Columbus Lansingburg Council. He was also a member of the Elks, the Rensselaer County Society, the Rensselaer County Bar Association, and the Troy Chamber of Commerce. He attended the St. Augustine's Church in Upper Troy. In 1923, he married Margaret Elizabeth Connery. They had two daughters, Mrs. James P. Ryan and Mrs. H. Paul Schneider. He was also a director of the Community Hotel Corps, a member of the board of Leonard Hospital, a charter member of the Troy Country Club, an honorary director of the Society of The Friendly Sons of St. Patrick, and a member of the Holy Name Society.

Mackrell died at Leonard Hospital on August 31, 1961. He was buried in St. John’s Cemetery.

New York State Senate
Preceded by James W. Yelverton	New York State Senate; 31st District; 1919–1920	Succeeded by Frederick E. Draper
