= George W. Kavanaugh =

American politician and businessman

Colonel George W. Kavanaugh

Member of the New York State Assembly for Saratoga County
- In office January 1, 1897 – December 31, 1898
- Preceded by: Charles H. McNaughton
- Succeeded by: George H. West

Personal details
- Born: George Washington Kavanaugh; May 22, 1862 Waterford, New York
- Died: September 6, 1951 (aged 89) Spring Lake, New Jersey
- Spouse: Marie Miller Haberle (m. 1912)
- Relations: Frederick W. Kavanaugh (brother)
- Children: 2
- Parent(s): Luke Kavanaugh; Mary Monaghan Kavanaugh

Col. George Washington Kavanaugh (May 22, 1862 – September 6, 1951) was an American politician and businessman originally from Waterford, New York.

== Early life ==
Kavanaugh was born on May 22, 1862, in Waterford, New York, into a family that was prominent in the knitting industry. He was the son of Mary (née Monaghan) Kavanaugh and Luke Kavanaugh, a pioneer manufacturer of knitting machinery and the inventor of a knitting burr that revolutionized the industry in this country. His younger brother was Frederick W. Kavanaugh, who served in the New York State Senate from 1921 to 1924 and owned significant real estate, including a hotel in Cody, Wyoming (named for his friend, William "Buffalo Bill" Cody); after years of ill-health, Frederick committed suicide in 1940.

== Career ==
After working for his father for several years, Kavanaugh went into business for himself as a Cotton Manufacturer in Cohoes, New York, in 1884. In 1896, he was appointed to serve on New York Governor Levi Morton's staff, with the rank of Colonel. In the fall of that year, he was elected to the New York State Assembly from Saratoga County by a plurality of approximately 4,500. His term in office began on January 1, 1897, he was re-elected in 1897 without opposition and served until December 31, 1898.

After his marriage, the Kavanaughs moved into an elegant eight-story Beaux-Arts townhouse at 10 East 62nd Street and soon began to appear in the Society columns. They threw many elaborate parties at their residence, including for Marie's close friend, Elizabeth Hope de la Poer Beresford, Baroness Decies (the former Elizabeth Wharton Drexel). In 1943, as commercial properties began to surround their residence, the Kavanaughs bought the house next door at 8 East 62nd Street to protect their property. The value of the combined properties was $211,000 in 1943.

== Personal life ==
In 1912, while in London, Kavanaugh was married to the Marie Magdalena (née Miller) Haberle (1868–1954). The widow of William Henry Haberle, a brewery heir from Syracuse, New York, she was a daughter of Andrew John Miller (a native of Urspringen in Bavaria) and Caroline (née Gratwohl) Miller (a native of Sigmaringen in Hohenzollern). From her first marriage to Haberle, she had two daughters: Virginia Haberle (who married Burns Lyman Smith) and Leonora Haberle (who married Charles Jolly Werner). In July 1917, Kavanaugh adopted both of Marie's daughters. His wife became known for her extensive and expensive jewelry collection.

Kavanaugh died on September 6, 1951, at their summer home in Spring Lake, New Jersey. After a funeral at Christ Methodist Church at 60th Street and Park Avenue, he was buried at Woodlawn Cemetery in the Bronx. His widow died at their residence in New York City in January 1954.

New York State Assembly
Preceded by Charles H. McNaughton	New York State Assembly; Saratoga County; 1897–1898	Succeeded by George H. West
