= James W. Yelverton =

American politician (1869–1950)

Member of the New York State Senate from the 32nd district
- In office January 1, 1919 – December 31, 1920
- Preceded by: Theodore Douglas Robinson
- Succeeded by: Frederick W. Kavanaugh

Member of the New York State Senate from the 31st district
- In office January 1, 1917 – December 31, 1918
- Preceded by: Arden L. Norton
- Succeeded by: John J. Mackrell

Personal details
- Born: James Walker Yelverton; May 16, 1869 Schenectady, New York, U.S.
- Died: 1950 (aged 80–81)
- Party: Republican
- Spouse: Mary Cochran (Ellis) Veeder (m. 1901)
- Children: 2 (1 stepchild)
- Occupation: Politician

James Walker Yelverton (May 16, 1869 in Schenectady, New York – 1950) was an American politician from New York.

== Life ==
He was the son of Thomas Yelverton (c.1845–1888), at the time of his death Clerk of Schenectady County, and Leah Little (Walker) Yelverton (1845–1899). He attended Union Classical Institute in Schenectady.

On December 28, 1896, he was appointed by Gov. Levi P. Morton as Treasurer of Schenectady County, to fill the vacancy caused by the death of John G. L. Ackerman.

On November 30, 1901, he married Mary Cochran (Ellis) Veeder (1864–1938), and they had a daughter, Ruth Ellis Yelverton (born 1903). Mary Ellis was the daughter of Charles G. Ellis (1842–1891), owner of the Schenectady Locomotive Works from 1878 until his death. She had been married to Harmon W. Veeder who died in 1900, and had a daughter from her first marriage, Mary Elizabeth Ellis Veeder (born 1898).

Yelverton was a member of the New York State Senate from 1917 to 1920, sitting in the 140th, 141st (both 31st D.), 142nd and 143rd New York State Legislatures (both 32nd D.).

== Sources ==
- APPOINTED BY GOV. MORTON in NYT on December 29, 1896
- MRS. JAMES W. YELVERTON, his wife's obit, in NYT on November 1, 1938 (subscription required)
- Yelverton genealogy at Schenectady History
- Death announcement in Journal of the Senate of New York] (1950; Vol. I, pg. 687)

New York State Senate
Preceded by Arden L. Norton	New York State Senate; 31st District; 1917–1918	Succeeded by John J. Mackrell
Preceded by Theodore Douglas Robinson	New York State Senate; 32nd District; 1919–1920	Succeeded by Frederick W. Kavanaugh
