= Blatchley House =

Historic house in New York, United States

- U.S. National Register of Historic Places
- Location within New York Location within the United States
- Location: 370 Blatchley Rd., near Jordanville, New York
- Coordinates: 42°54′13.37″N 74°56′1.81″W
- Area: less than one acre
- Built: 1855
- Architectural style: Italianate
- NRHP reference No.: 08000770
- Added to NRHP: August 15, 2008

The Blatchley House is a historic house located at 370 Blatchley Road near Jordanville, Herkimer County, New York.

== Description and history ==
It was built in 1855, and is a two-story, nearly square timber-framed, flat-roofed vernacular Italianate style residence. It has a two-story main block above a high raised basement of cut and dressed limestone, with a two-story flat roofed wing.

It was listed on the National Register of Historic Places on August 15, 2008.
