= James Monroe (New York politician) =

American politician

James Monroe Jr.
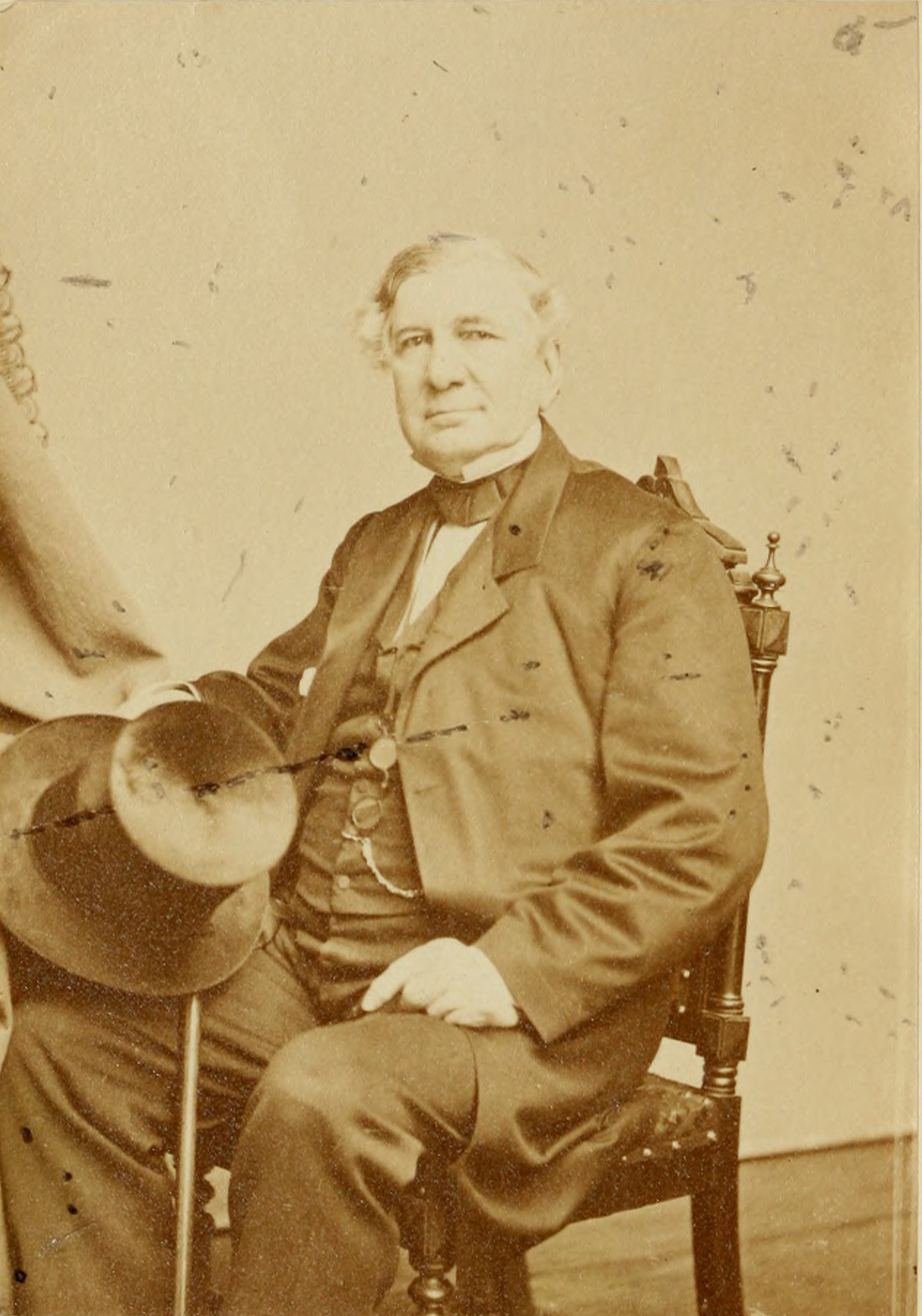

Member of the New York State Assembly from the 10th District
- In office January 1, 1852 – December 31, 1852
- Preceded by: Lebbeus B. Ward
- Succeeded by: Henry Shaw
- In office January 1, 1850 – December 31, 1850
- Preceded by: Garret H. Striker
- Succeeded by: Lebbeus B. Ward

Member of the U.S. House of Representatives from New York's 3rd district
- In office March 4, 1839 – March 3, 1841
- Preceded by: Churchill C. Cambreleng, Edward Curtis, Ogden Hoffman, Ely Moore
- Succeeded by: Charles G. Ferris, Fernando Wood, James I. Roosevelt, John McKeon

Personal details
- Born: September 10, 1799 Albemarle County, Virginia
- Died: September 7, 1870 (aged 70) Orange, New Jersey
- Party: Whig
- Spouse: Elizabeth Mary Douglas
- Children: 2
- Parent(s): Ann Bell; Andrew Augustine Monroe
- Relatives: James Monroe (uncle); Elizabeth Kortright (aunt-in-law)
- Education: United States Military Academy

Military service
- Allegiance: United States of America
- Branch/service: 4th Artillery Regiment
- Years of service: 1815–1822, 1832–1832
- Rank: First lieutenant
- Battles/wars: Second Barbary War: • Battle off Cape Gata; Black Hawk War

James Monroe (September 10, 1799 – September 7, 1870) was an American politician who served as the United States representative from New York (1839–1841). He was the nephew of President James Monroe.

== Early life ==
James Monroe was born in Albemarle County, Virginia on September 10, 1799. He was born to Ann (née Bell) Monroe and Andrew Augustine Monroe (ca. 1764-1826). Andrew Monroe was a younger brother of President James Monroe (1758–1831).

Monroe's paternal grandfather, Spence Monroe (1727–1774), was a moderately prosperous planter who also practiced carpentry. His grandmother Elizabeth Jones (1730–1774) Monroe married Spence Monroe in 1752, and they had five surviving children, Elizabeth, James Monroe, Spence, Andrew, and Joseph. His paternal 2x-great grandfather, Patrick Andrew Monroe, emigrated to America from Scotland in the mid-17th century. In 1650, he patented a large tract of land in Washington Parish, Westmoreland County, Virginia. Among James Monroe's ancestors were French Huguenot immigrants, who came to Virginia in 1700.

== Career ==
Monroe graduated from the United States Military Academy in 1815, and was commissioned in the Artillery Corps. Shortly after graduating, he was sent to fight in the war with Algiers, and was wounded while serving as a gunnery officer on board the USS Guerriere. From 1817 to 1822, he served as aide-de-camp to General Winfield Scott, receiving a promotion to first lieutenant in December 1818. Upon the re-organization of the US Army in 1821, he was assigned to the 4th Artillery Regiment. In June 1832, he was again appointed as General Scott's aide for the Black Hawk War, but shortly afterward contracted cholera. He resigned his commission on September 30, 1832, and moved to New York City.

=== Political career ===
Monroe served as assistant alderman of New York City in 1832, alderman 1833–1835, and president of the board of aldermen in 1834. He was elected as a Whig to the 26th United States Congress, holding office from March 4, 1839, to March 3, 1841. He was a member of the New York State Assembly (New York Co.) in 1850 and 1852.

== Personal life ==
He married Elizabeth "Eliza" Mary Douglas (1799–1852), daughter of George Douglas (1741–1799) and Margaret Corne (1767–1827). Together, they were the parents of:

- George Monroe, who entered the seminary.
- William D. Monroe
- Frances "Fanny" Monroe (1824–1906), who married Douglas Robinson Sr. (1824–1893)
- Elizabeth Mary Monroe (c.1833–1857), who married Solomon Betts Davies (1827–1860)

Following his wife's death, he retired from public life to Orange, New Jersey, where he died on September 7, 1870, at age of 70, days before his 71st birthday. He is interred at Trinity Church Cemetery in Manhattan.

=== Descendants ===
Monroe's grandson, Douglas Robinson Jr. (1855–1918), married Corinne Roosevelt (1861–1933), the younger sister of President Theodore Roosevelt and an aunt of First Lady, Eleanor Roosevelt. Their children, and Monroe's great-grandchildren include Connecticut Representative Corinne Douglas Robinson (1886–1971) and New York State Senator Theodore Douglas Robinson (1883–1934), who married his distant cousin Helen Rebecca Roosevelt, daughter of James Roosevelt (1854—1927), the brother of Franklin Delano Roosevelt, and Helen Schermerhorn Astor (1855—1893) of the Astor family.

New York State Assembly
Preceded by Garret H. Striker	New York State Assembly; New York County, 10th District; 1850	Succeeded by Lebbeus B. Ward
Preceded by Lebbeus B. Ward	New York State Assembly; New York County, 10th District; 1852	Succeeded by Henry Shaw
U.S. House of Representatives
Preceded by Churchill C. Cambreleng, Edward Curtis, Ogden Hoffman, Ely Moore	Member of the U.S. House of Representatives from New York's 3rd congressional district 1839 – 1841 with Edward Curtis, Moses H. Grinnell and Ogden Hoffman	Succeeded by Charles G. Ferris, John McKeon, James I. Roosevelt, Fernando Wood
