= List of listed buildings in Kelton, Dumfries and Galloway =

This is a list of listed buildings in the parish of Kelton, Dumfries and Galloway, Scotland.

== List ==
Name	Location	Date Listed	Grid Ref. (Note: Sometimes known as OSGB36, the grid reference (where provided) is based on the British national grid reference system used by the Ordnance Survey. • "Guide to National Grid". Ordnance Survey. • "Get-a-map". Ordnance Survey.)	Geo-coordinates	Notes	LB Number (Note: Historic Environment Scotland assign a unique alphanumeric identifier to each designated site in Scotland, for listed buildings this always begins with "LB", for example "LB12345".)	Image
Slatehole				54°55′11″N 3°57′34″W	Category B	9827	Upload Photo
Billies Farmhouse				54°53′39″N 3°59′25″W	Category B	9833	Upload Photo
Douglas Mausoleum, Near To Kelton Parish Church, Railings And Gatepiers				54°55′20″N 3°56′18″W	Category A	9835	Upload another image
Gelston Castle Estate, Gelston Coach House And Gatepiers				54°54′13″N 3°54′35″W	Category B	9837	Upload Photo
Kelton Old Church In Old Churchyard				54°55′15″N 3°56′05″W	Category C(S)	9821	Upload Photo
Kelton Parish Church				54°55′17″N 3°56′15″W	Category B	9822	Upload Photo
Ingleston				54°54′05″N 3°54′55″W	Category B	9817	Upload Photo
Rhonehouse, Rodney House				54°55′02″N 3°57′48″W	Category C(S)	9826	Upload Photo
Threave Bridge				54°55′18″N 3°58′18″W	Category B	9828	Upload Photo
Kelton Mill, Byre				54°55′17″N 3°57′32″W	Category C(S)	9820	Upload Photo
Threave House				54°55′22″N 3°56′51″W	Category B	9829	Upload another image
Threave Stables				54°55′29″N 3°56′56″W	Category B	9830	Upload Photo
Dildawn House And Walled Garden				54°54′43″N 3°59′13″W	Category B	9834	Upload Photo
Old Bridge Of Dee				54°55′06″N 3°58′34″W	Category A	9838	Upload another image See more images
Kelton Mains Farm				54°56′03″N 3°57′33″W	Category B	9818	Upload Photo
Airieland Farm House				54°53′40″N 3°56′20″W	Category B	9831	Upload Photo
Gelston Castle				54°54′17″N 3°54′31″W	Category A	9836	Upload another image
Gelston Castle Estate, Gelston Stables And Walled Gardens				54°54′14″N 3°54′34″W	Category B	9816	Upload another image
Kelton Mill				54°55′18″N 3°57′31″W	Category C(S)	9819	Upload Photo
Rhonehouse, Creaghlas				54°55′03″N 3°57′46″W	Category C(S)	9824	Upload Photo
Rhonehouse Of Kelton, Millhill				54°55′03″N 3°57′44″W	Category B	9825	Upload Photo
Rhonehouse, An Teallach				54°55′00″N 3°57′49″W	Category C(S)	9823	Upload Photo
Airieland House				54°53′42″N 3°56′14″W	Category B	9832	Upload Photo

== Key ==
The scheme for classifying buildings in Scotland is:

- Category A: "buildings of national or international importance, either architectural or historic; or fine, little-altered examples of some particular period, style or building type."
- Category B: "buildings of regional or more than local importance; or major examples of some particular period, style or building type, which may have been altered."
- Category C: "buildings of local importance; lesser examples of any period, style, or building type, as originally constructed or moderately altered; and simple traditional buildings which group well with other listed buildings."

In March 2016 there were 47,288 listed buildings in Scotland. Of these, 8% were Category A, and 50% were Category B, with the remaining 42% being Category C.
