= Jordanville Public Library =

- U.S. National Register of Historic Places
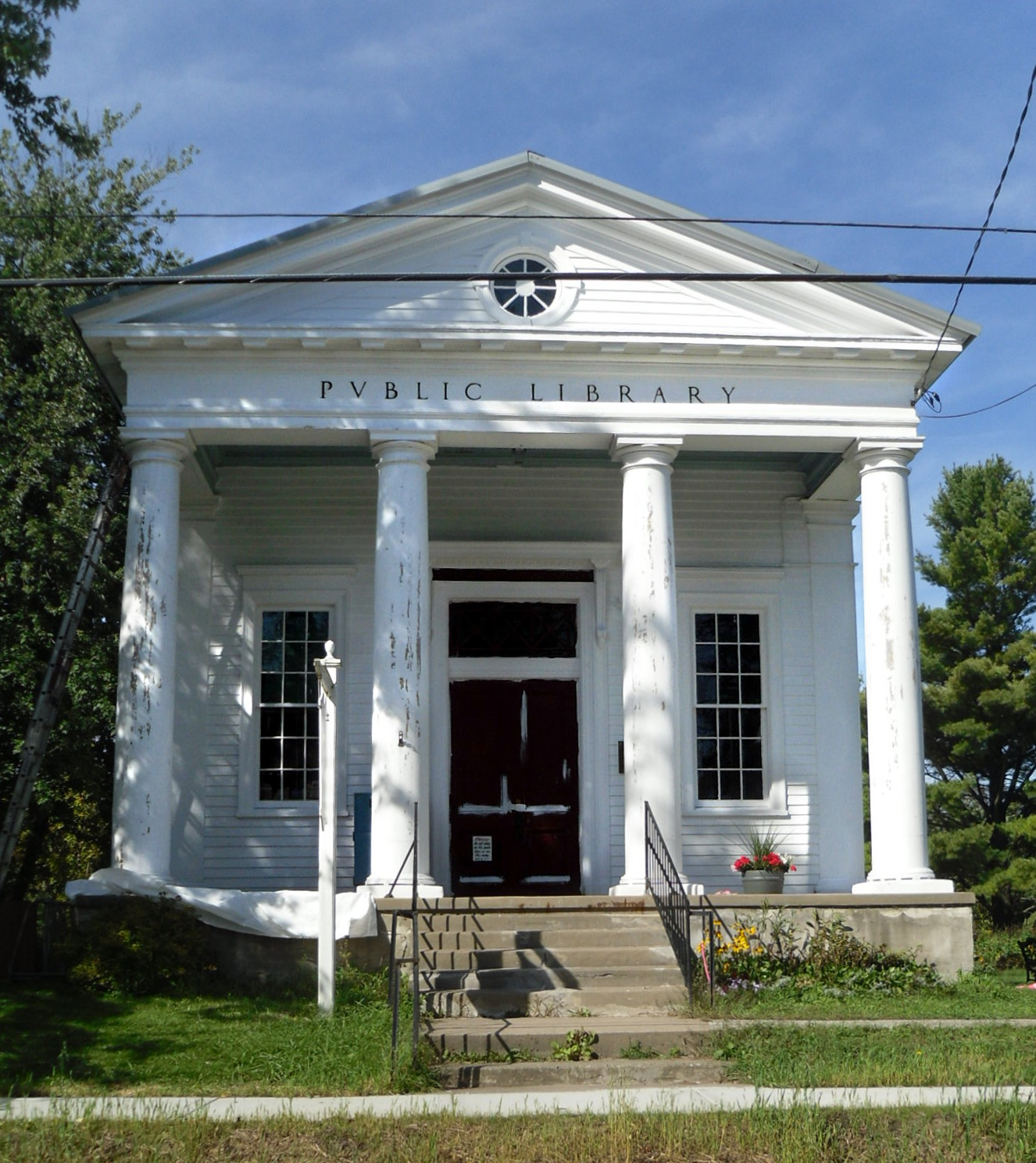
- Jordanville Public Library, September 2010

- Location within New York Location within the United States
- Location: Main St., Jordanville, New York
- Coordinates: 42°54′56″N 74°56′51″W
- Area: 1 acre (0.40 ha)
- Built: 1907
- Architect: Trowbridge & Livingston
- Architectural style: Classical Revival
- NRHP reference No.: 84002397
- Added to NRHP: May 24, 1984

Jordanville Public Library is a historic community library building in Jordanville, New York, United States. Built in 1907–1908, it is a one-story, gable-roofed structure with clapboard siding that features an entrance portico with four Tuscan order columns. It was designed by New York City architects Trowbridge & Livingston in the Classical Revival style.

It was listed on the National Register of Historic Places in 1984.
