= Eben Dyer Jordan =

American business executive in Boston

Eben Dyer Jordan Sr.
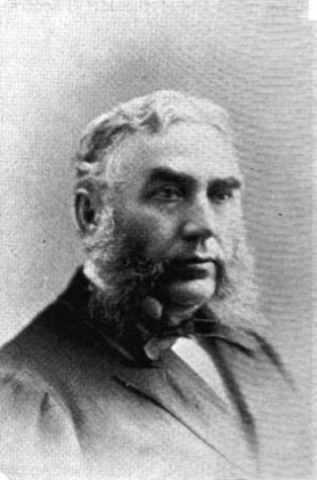
- Jordan in 1890
- Born: October 13, 1822; Danville, Maine, U.S.
- Died: November 15, 1895 (aged 73); Boston, Massachusetts, U.S.
- Occupation: Businessman
- Known for: Co-founder of Jordan Marsh and The Boston Globe
- Spouse: Julia M. Clark (after 1847)
- Children: 5
- Parent(s): Benjamin Jordan; Lydia Wright Jordan

Eben Dyer Jordan Sr. (October 13, 1822 − November 15, 1895) was an American business executive, best remembered as the co-founder of the department store chain Jordan, Marsh & Co. with Benjamin L. Marsh in 1841.

== Early life ==
Jordan was born in Danville, Maine, on October 13, 1822. He was a son of Benjamin and Lydia (née Wright) Jordan and, through his father, was directly descended from the Rev. Robert Jordan, a clergyman of the Church of England, who came to America and settled in present-day Maine in or around 1640.

After his father died young, leaving his mother in charge of several children, Jordan was sent to live with a neighbor on their farm where he learned to farm, saving up enough money to leave Portland and move to Boston at age fourteen.

== Career ==
Jordan clerked for two years in the dry goods store of William P. Tenney & Co. before working for another merchant named Pratt. At age nineteen, one of Boston's leading merchants, Joshua Stetson, "appreciated his ability, and offered to assist him in starting business on his own account." At twenty-five he sold his thriving store and went to work for J. M. Beebe, who taught him "not only a practical knowledge of the principles, methods, and in the management of a great business enterprise, but of the system which Mr. Beebe had perfected only after twenty-five years of close and assiduous labor and study."

In addition to co-founding the department store chain Jordan Marsh with Benjamin L. Marsh in 1841, Jordan led a group of businessmen in founding The Boston Globe in 1872.

== Personal life ==
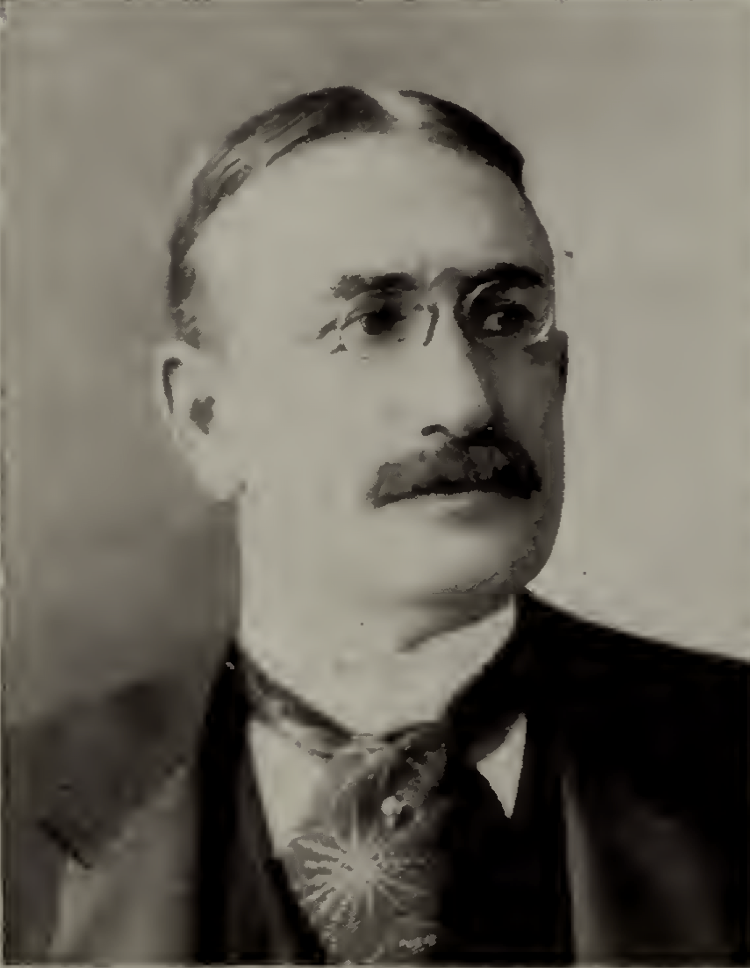
Jordan's son, Eben D. Jordan Jr. (1857-1916), a major Boston arts philanthropist who played an influential role in the establishment of the New England Conservatory and the Boston Opera Company

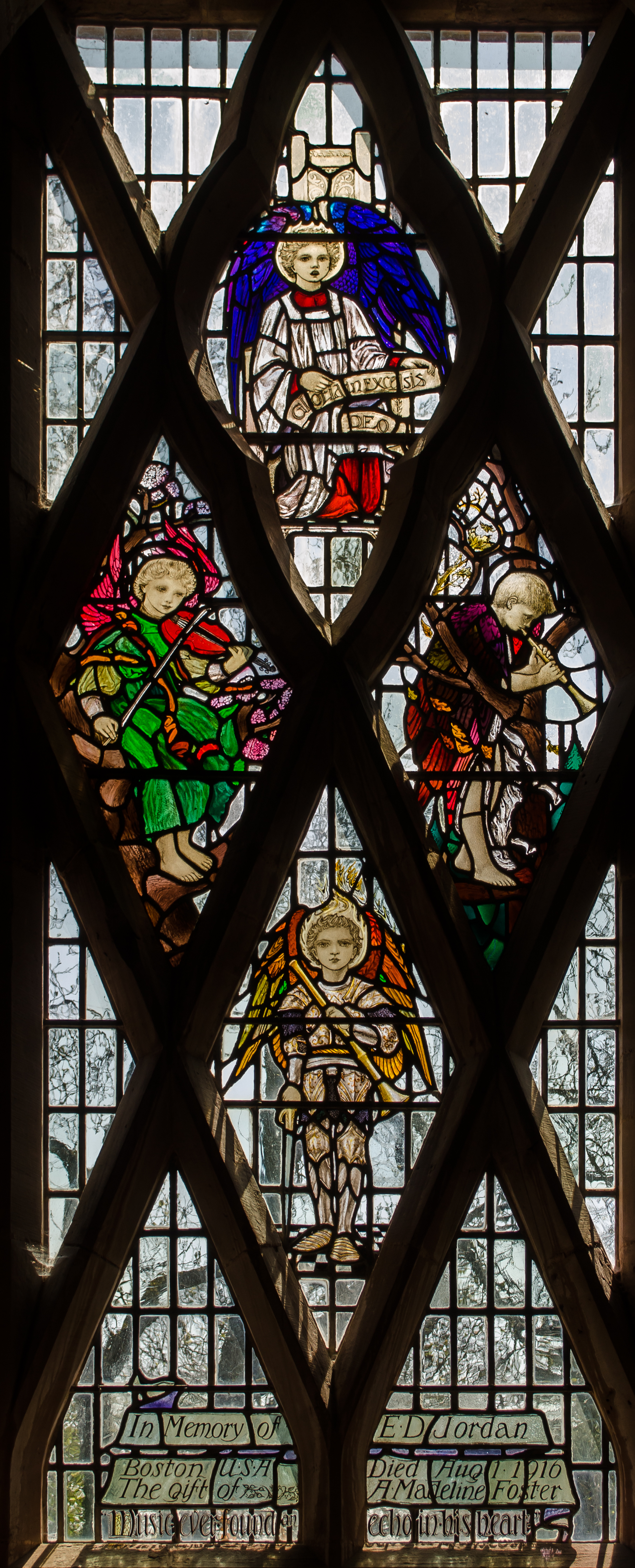
A stained-glass window by Christopher Whall in Dyer's memory at All Saints' Church in Herefordshire

On January 13, 1847, he married Julia M. Clark (1825–1897), a daughter of James and Elizabeth (née Raymond) Clark. They had five children:

- Walter Jordan (1848–1854), who died young.
- James Clark Jordan (1850–1910), who married Helen L. Stevens and Jeannette Amanda Stiles; he developed Jordan Park in San Francisco.
- Julia Maria Jordan (b. 1852), who married Herbert Dumaresq in 1873; he was a cotton manufacturer and who later became a partner in Jordan, Marsh & Company.
- Eben Dyer Jordan Jr. (1857–1916), who married May Sheppard (1861–1920), a daughter of Joseph Buzby Sheppard, in 1883.
- Alice Madeline Jordan (1863–1935), who married the Rev. Arthur Wellesley Foster in 1885; as a wedding present Jordan gifted them Brockhampton Court, near Fownhope in Herefordshire, England.

== Death ==
Jordan died on November 15, 1895, at his residence on Beacon Street in Boston. The Eben Jordan House is located on 46 Beacon Street in Beacon Hill, Boston. In 2000, a petition to grant landmark status to the interior was submitted to the Boston Landmarks Commission; as of 2022, the request is still under study. His daughter Alice Foster built All Saints' Church, Brockhampton as a memorial to her parents; completed in 1902, it was the work of the Arts & Crafts pioneer W. R. Lethaby.

=== Descendants ===
Through his son Eben Jr., he was a grandfather of Robert Jordan (1884–1932) and Dorothy Jordan (d. 1976), who married Monroe Douglas Robinson (1887–1944), a son of Corinne Roosevelt Robinson and Douglas Robinson Jr. and grandson of Douglas Robinson Sr. and Theodore Roosevelt Sr. Robinson was a nephew of U.S. President Theodore Roosevelt and a first cousin of First Lady Eleanor Roosevelt.
