= Gelston Castle =

Castle in Great Britain

Coordinates: 54.9048°N 3.9087°W

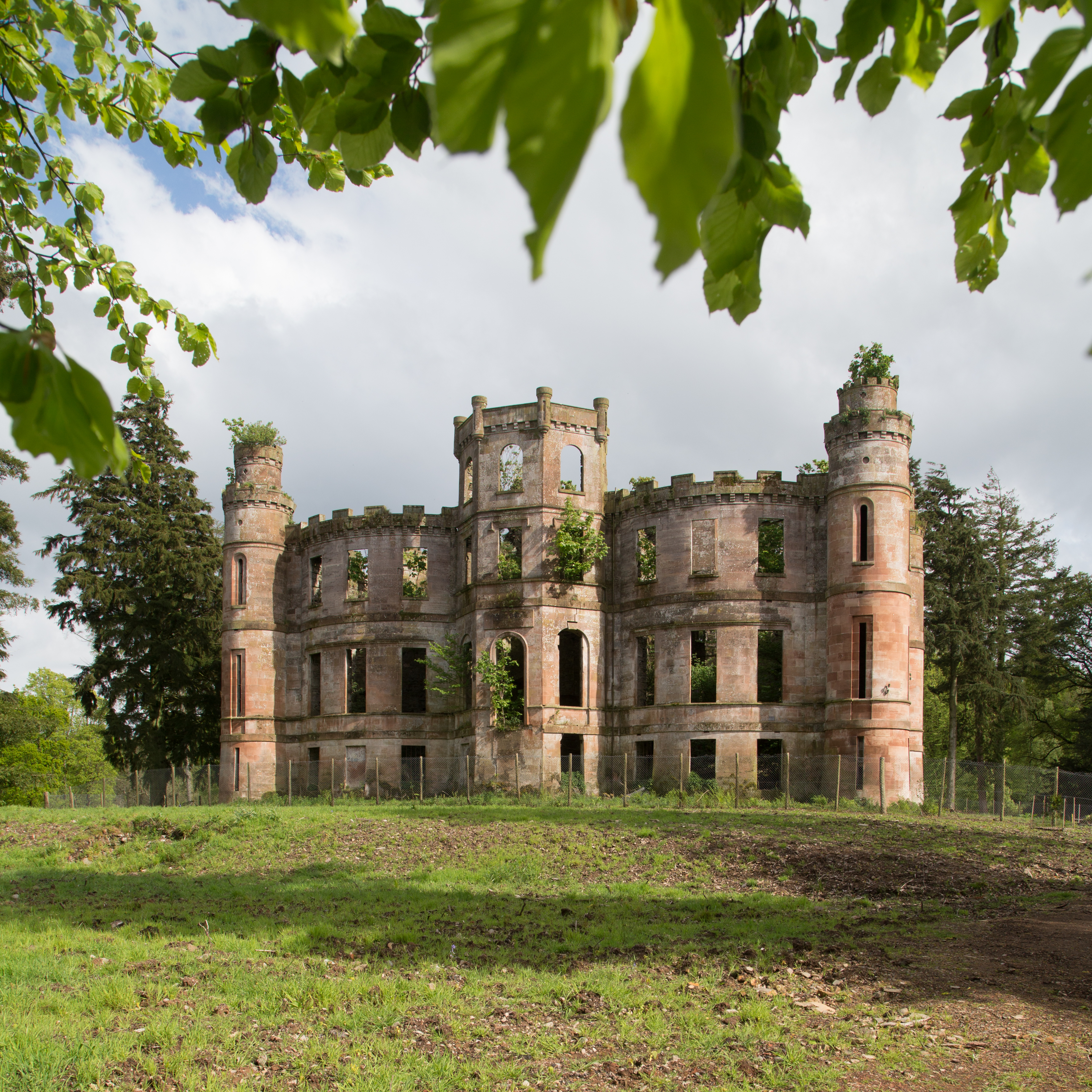
Gelston Castle

Gelston Castle, located near Castle Douglas in Kirkcudbrightshire in Dumfries and Galloway, Scotland, was built by Sir William Douglas of Castle Douglas, who had acquired the lands of Gelston in 1799. However, Sir William Douglas died without issue in 1809 and his property was divided between various nieces and nephews, with Gelston going to the youngest daughter of his brother James, Mathilda Douglas. In 1813 Mathilda married William Maitland, and their family continued to preside over the estate for most of the 19th Century. Gelston then became the property of the Galliers-Pratts who retained the castle for pheasant shooting, and from whom it was requisitioned during World War II. During this time it served as a home for handicapped boys evacuated from Glasgow, before the roof was removed once this use had ceased.

The ancient owners of Gelston were probably monks of Iona. King William, 'The Lion of Scotland', granted Gelston to the monks of Holyrood, sometime between 1165 and 1214.

In the Ragman roll of 1296, John of Geneleston (John de Gevelston) was recorded as owner. By 1472, Donald Maclellan of Gelston was owner. A succession of owners followed, including the Maxwell family.

The design of Gelston Castle is attributed to architect Richard Crichton, a pupil of Robert Adam, and its construction is said to have been completed by 1805.

This important country house in Adam castellated style is now gutted and roofless, but complete to wallhead. A square-plan with round tourelles at each angle, the walls are slightly ramped. The 3 storey advanced centre bays to the front elevation give a tower effect. It has finely tooled droved red sandstone masonwork are of the very highest quality.

A mansion of the same name was built near Jordonville, New York in 1836 by Harriet Douglas Cruger, a niece of the owner of the Scottish property, Sir William Douglas of Castle Douglas.
