= William Rose Robinson =

British civil servant (1822-1886)

Sir William Rose Robinson KCSI

Governor of Madras (acting)
- In office 28 April 1875 – 23 November 1875
- Governor-General: Thomas Baring, 1st Earl of Northbrook
- Preceded by: Vere Henry Hobart, Lord Hobart
- Succeeded by: Richard Temple-Grenville, 3rd Duke of Buckingham and Chandos

Member of the Executive Council of the Viceroy of India
- In office 1873–1878
- Governors-General: Thomas Baring, 1st Earl of Northbrook, Robert Bulwer-Lytton, 1st Earl of Lytton

Personal details
- Born: 28 June 1822
- Died: 27 April 1886 (aged 63) United Kingdom

Sir William Rose Robinson KCSI (28 June 1822 – 27 April 1886) was a British civil servant of the Indian civil service who acted as the Governor of Madras from 28 April 1875 to 23 November 1875.

== Early life and education ==
William Rose Robinson was born in 1822 to William Rose Robinson. He had his education at Bonn and Haileybury graduating in 1840-41.

== Career ==
Robinson joined the Indian civil service in 1842 and went to India. He became the Inspector General of Police (Madras Presidency) in 1865 and served in the capacity from 1865 to 1870. He served as the revenue member of the Executive council of the Governor of Madras from 1870 to 1873 and as additional member in the executive council of the Viceroy of India from 1873 to 1878. Robinson acted as the Governor of Madras from 28 April 1875 to 23 November 1875.

== Death ==
Robinson died on 27 April 1886.

== Honours ==
Robinson was made a Companion of the Order of the Star of India in 1866 and promoted to a Knight Commander in 1876.

Preceded by Vere Henry Hobart, Lord Hobart	Governor of Madras (acting); 28 April 1875–23 November 1875	Succeeded by Richard Temple-Grenville, 3rd Duke of Buckingham and Chandos
