= Sir William Douglas, 1st Baronet =

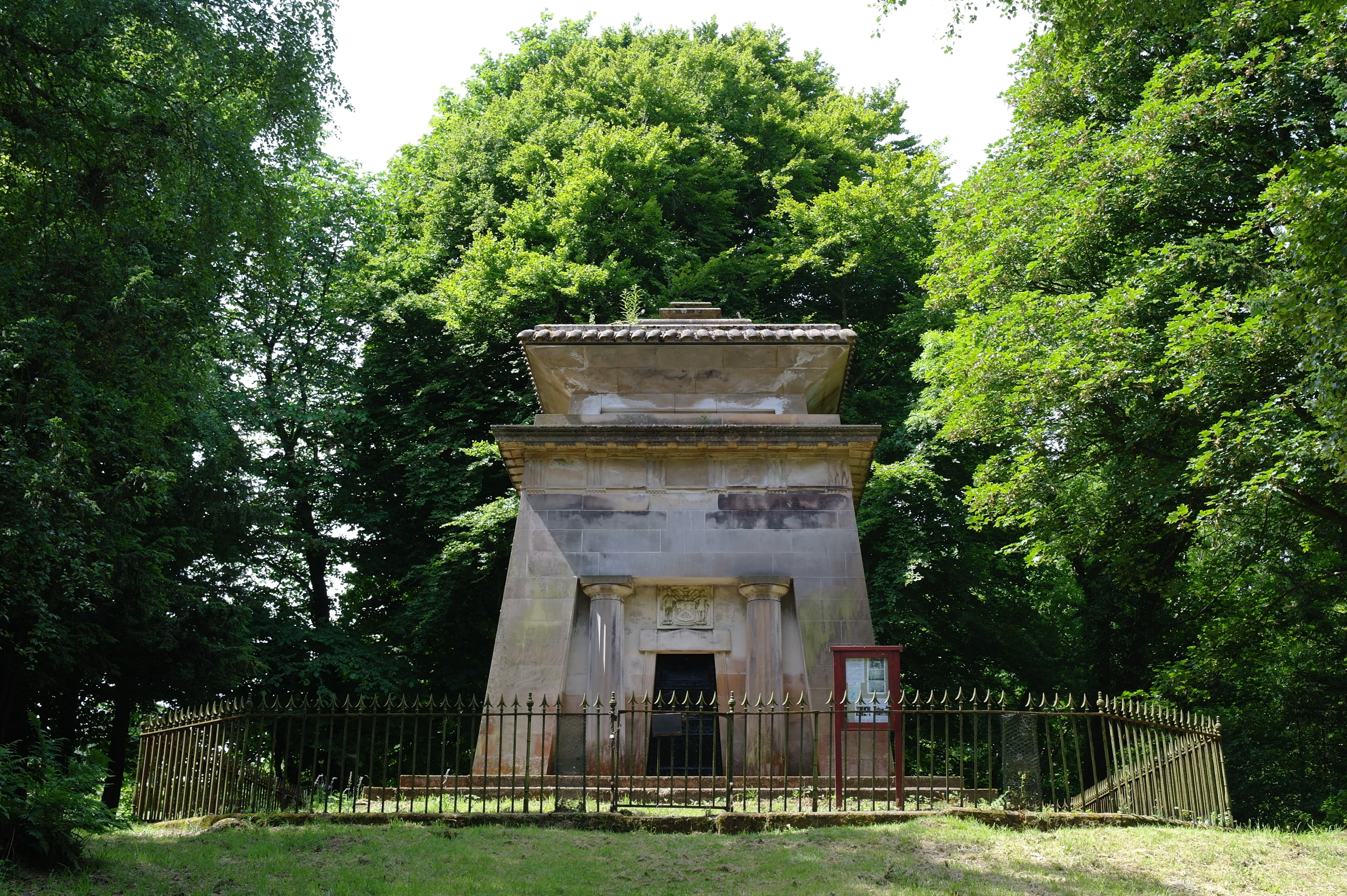
The Douglas Mausoleum

Sir William Douglas, 1st Baronet (died 1809) was a Scottish landowner and industrialist, best known for founding the planned town of Castle Douglas in the Stewartry of Kirkcudbright (now within Dumfries and Galloway), south-west Scotland.

He began life as a humble pedlar but soon became wealthy from dealings in an unspecified 'American trade'. He returned to Scotland in the late 18th century, where his major work was the development of cotton mills and a town next to Carlingwark Loch. This was a planned town set around a grid plan system of streets, similar to that of Edinburgh's New Town, planned at around the same time. This town was named Castle Douglas in 1792, having previously been known as "Carlingwark". Sir William also established cotton mills in Newton Stewart, which was temporarily renamed "Newton Douglas" in his honour, and a range of industries in Castle Douglas including a brewery, woollen mill, soap works and tannery.

Douglas was granted a baronetcy in 1801. In 1805 he built himself a mansion at Gelston Castle, which has been attributed to architect Robert Crichton. The castellated mansion is currently a vacant shell.

An obelisk was erected in the village of Gelston in his memory. He died unmarried, in 1809, and his lands were divided amongst his nieces and nephews, whilst his baronetcy became extinct.

His body was buried in a mausoleum which has been attributed to architect Walter Newall, named The Douglas Mausoleum, and this was added upon with at least 20 more members of family over the years. The site on Kelton Hill overlooks Carlingwark towards Castle Douglas.

Baronetage of the United Kingdom
New creation	Baronet (of Castle Douglas); 1801–1809	Extinct
Preceded by Montgomery baronets	Douglas baronets of Castle Douglas; 17 July 1801	Succeeded by Dillon baronets
