= Jordanville, New York =

- Hamlet
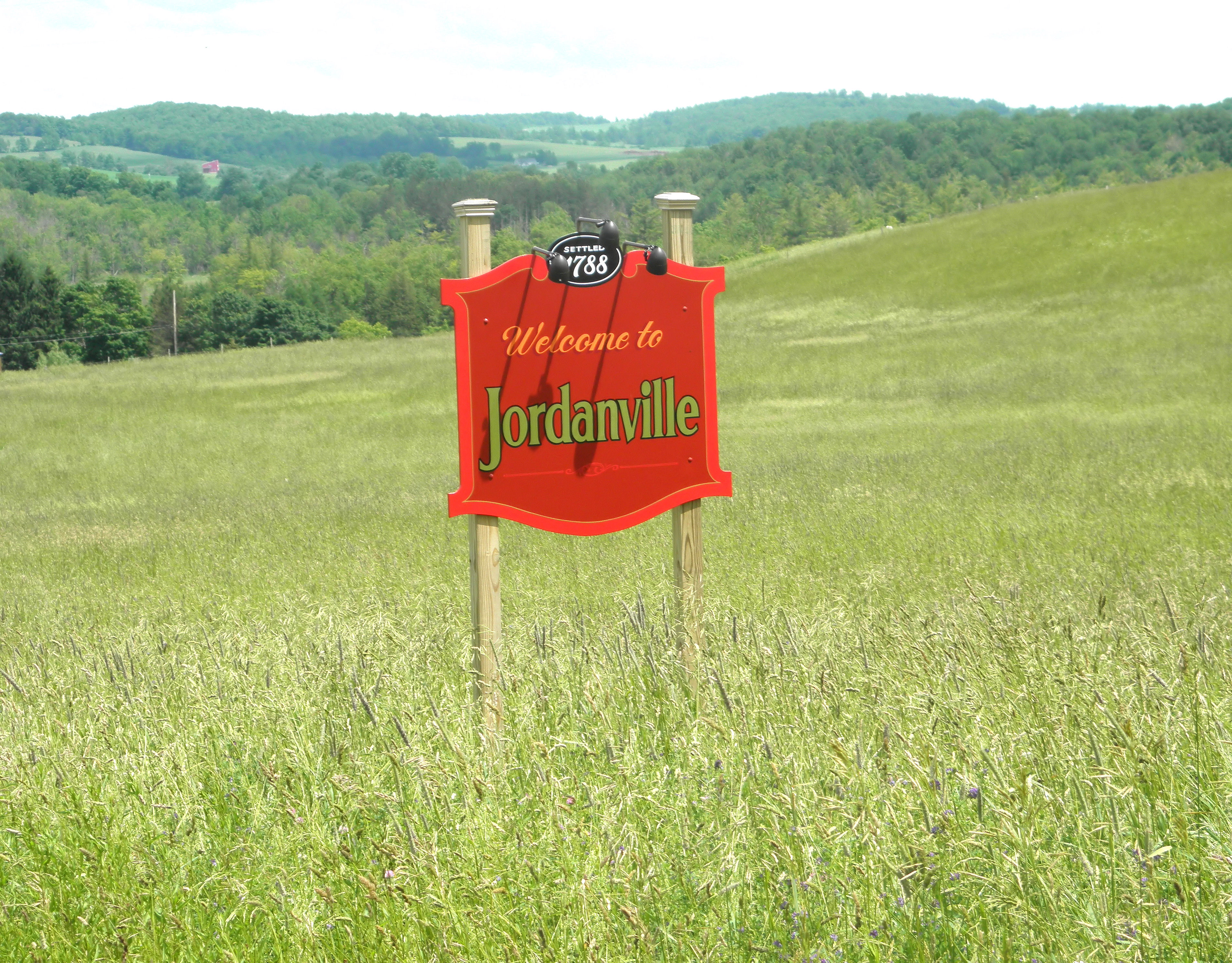
- Settlement sign for Jordanville

- Location within New York Location within the United States
- Coordinates: 42°54′53″N 74°57′06″W
- Country: United States
- State: New York
- County: Herkimer
- Town: Warren
- Elevation: 1,499 ft (457 m)
- Time zone: UTC-5 (Eastern (EST))
  - Summer (DST): UTC-4 (EDT)
- ZIP code: 13361
- Area code: 315

Jordanville is a hamlet in the town of Warren, Herkimer County, New York, United States. Jordanville is in the northwestern part of Warren, at the intersection of New York State Route 167 and County Route 155. The community was settled by European Americans after the Revolutionary War and before 1791. Its name was derived from the nearby Ocquionis Creek, which was used by settlers for baptisms and likened by them to the Jordan River.

== History ==
The hamlet was once served by the Southern New York Railroad, an electric trolley line that ran from Oneonta to Mohawk.

== Gelston Castle ==
This castle was built in 1836 by Harriet Douglas Cruger, with stone sourced from Little Falls, New York. She had been inspired as a young woman by seeing Gelston Castle, owned by her uncle in Scotland, which she visited. Harriet Douglas was described as an independent and eccentric woman, who had her marriage bed sawed in half and used as two couches after an acrimonious divorce. She was profiled in Miss Douglas of New York, a book written by Angus Davidson in 1953.

The property passed to her niece Fanny (Monroe) Robinson, daughter of Harriet's sister Elizabeth Mary (Douglas) and her husband James Monroe, nephew of President James Monroe. Fanny Robinson left the castle to her son Douglas Robinson. He married Corrine Roosevelt, the sister of President Theodore Roosevelt. Their eldest son, Theodore Douglas Robinson, married Helen Roosevelt, a half-niece of President Franklin D. Roosevelt. Helen Roosevelt Robinson was the last family member to live in the house, dying on July 8, 1962.

After Helen Roosevelt Robinson died, her grandson, Douglas Robinson Jr., sold the property to Jan Blair of New Jersey, who operated a retirement home on the premises. She sold the property to the Asian Conservation Laboratory in 1974. This organization subsequently sold the property to Frances Kudla, who operated a retirement home there.

Mrs. Kudla sold the property in 1979 to Mstislav Rostropovich, the Russian cellist who became musical director and conductor of the National Symphony Orchestra in Washington, DC. In 1983 he and his wife, soprano Galina Vishnevskaya, constructed a million dollar 8,300 sq ft (770 m^{2}) contemporary residence on the sprawling estate grounds, yards from the castle.

Largely unoccupied for most of the second half of the 20th century, the castle fell into a state of complete disrepair, with almost all of the structure now collapsed much like its namesake in Scotland. After Rostropovich left the United States to return to his homeland of Russia in the late 1990s after the fall of the Soviet Union, the whole estate was marketed as Gelston Manor during 2000–2007. Rostropovich's mansion and associated property was sold separately in 2006–2007. Since then, the castle has been a subject of tours on occasions organized by the Herkimer County Historical Society. That organization has held an annual "Weekend at Gelston Castle".

In 2007, Gelston Castle was purchased along with the Rostropovich Mansion and 330 acres (1.3 km^{2}) by the Safflyn Corporation. This environmental development corporation works with companies and individuals to reduce their carbon footprint, integrate renewable energy sources, promote environmentally safe products, and lower the bottom line for consumption of non-renewable resources. The Rostropovich Mansion has been renovated as a "Green Building" and is operated as a Wedding and Event Performance Center called Chateau Safflyn. The Castle is held as an historical attraction and the property is open for tours on a limited schedule.

== Holy Trinity Monastery ==
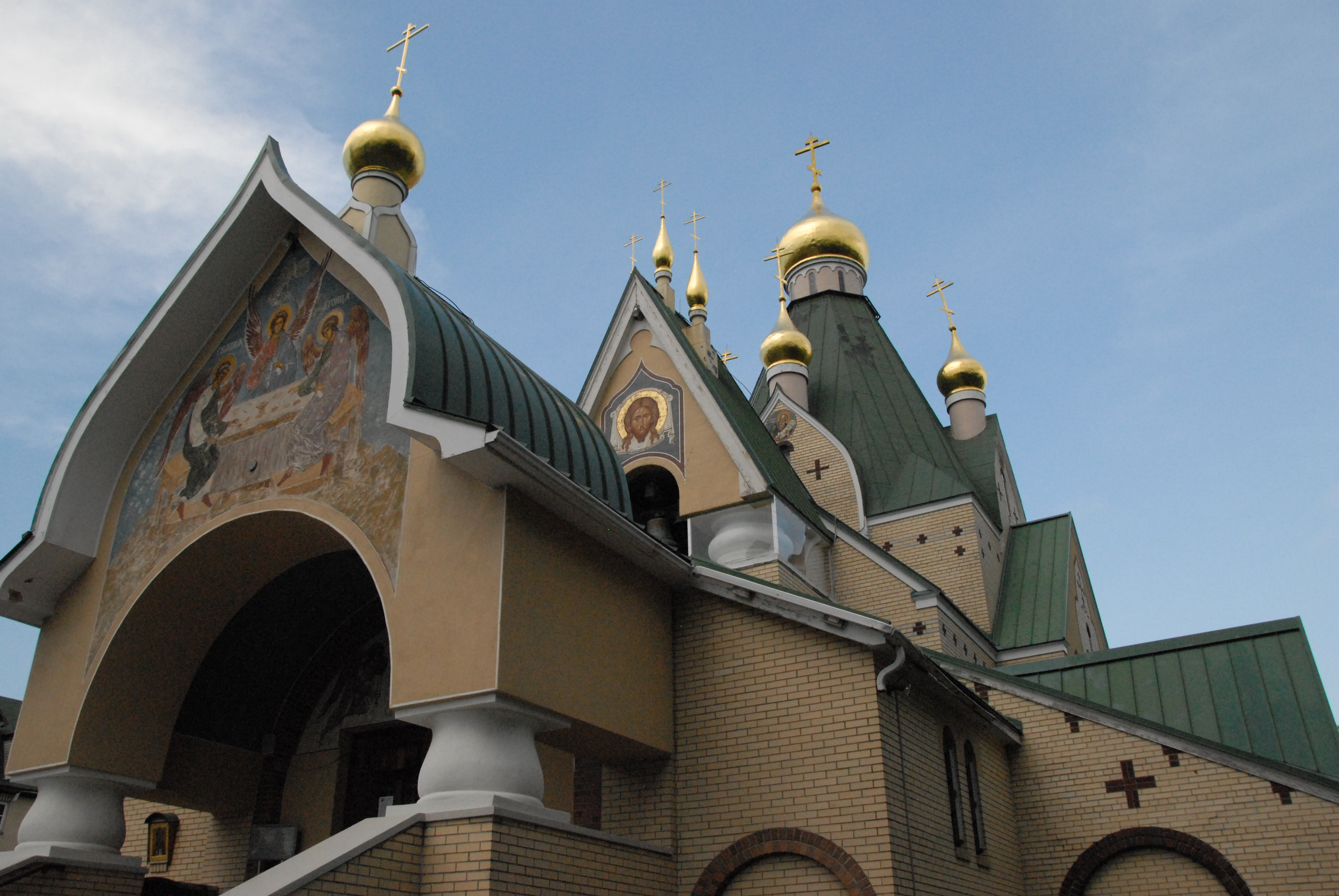
Holy Trinity Orthodox Monastery main church building.

The Holy Trinity Monastery for men (Russian Orthodox Church Outside of Russia (ROCOR), a jurisdiction within the Russian Orthodox Church) is located one mile (1.6 km) north of Jordanville. This monastery, which was founded in 1930, includes a cathedral, bell tower, monastic dormitory and Holy Trinity Orthodox Seminary; the latter was founded by 1948. The complex was listed on the National Register of Historic Places in 2011.

== Other historic buildings ==
The Jordanville Public Library was listed on the National Register of Historic Places in 1984 and the Blatchley House near Jordanville in 2008.

== Notable people ==
- William C. McDonald, first governor of the State of New Mexico; born in Jordanville.
- Metropolitan Laurus (Škurla), born in Czechoslovakia, attended the seminary before ordination, and served at the monastery. Ultimately he became First Hierarch of the Russian Orthodox Church Outside of Russia, negotiating reconciliation with the Metropolitan Patriarchate in 2007. He died in Jordanville and is buried at the monastery. Metropolitan Laurus was succeeded, as First Hierarch, by Metropolitan Hilarion (Kapral).
