= London Journal =

London Journal may refer to:

- The London Journal - British penny fiction weekly
- London Journal (Boswell) – James Boswell's London Journal
