= L. F. Powell =

British literary scholar (1881–1975)

Lawrence Fitzroy Powell (9 August 1881 – 17 July 1975) was an English literary scholar.

The son of Harry Powell (1830–1886), a trumpeter who had been wounded in the Charge of the Light Brigade, Powell was born in Oxford and educated at a London board school before working in Brasenose College's library from 1893-95. He then worked for the Bodleian Library under E. W. B. Nicholson from 1895 until in 1901 when he joined the group of scholars working on the New English Dictionary under William Craigie. Powell married Ethelwyn Rebecca Steane (1873/4−1941) on 31 July 1909; they had one son. Upon the outbreak of the Great War in 1914, Powell was declared unfit for active service but he joined the Admiralty two years later.

Powell was appointed librarian of the Taylor Institution in 1921, a post he held until 1949. He was awarded honorary fellowships at both St Catherine's College and Pembroke College in 1966 and was awarded an Oxford Doctor of Letters in 1969. He died in Banbury.

== Boswell's Life of Johnson ==
Powell was interested in fellow lexicographer Samuel Johnson. Johnsonian scholar R. W. Chapman asked Powell to revise George Birkbeck Hill's edition of James Boswell's Life of Samuel Johnson in 1923. His revised edition was published in 1934 in four volumes and "thereafter, as for Johnson, the title was inseparable from his name". A fifth volume consisted of his edition of Boswell's The Journal of a Tour to the Hebrides after Boswell papers were discovered at Malahide Castle and Fettercairn House. The sixth volume was the index.

Durham University awarded Powell a Doctor of Letters in 1935 on the strength of his work on Boswell. Right up until his death, Powell continued research for an updated edition of the Life of Johnson. J. D. Fleeman claimed that "his Boswell is a lasting memorial".
