= Sir Alexander Boswell, 1st Baronet =

Scottish poet, antiquary and politician (1775–1822)

Sir Alexander Boswell Bt FRSE FSA
- Born: 9 October 1775; Auchinleck House, East Ayrshire, Scotland
- Died: 27 March 1822 (aged 46); Auchtertool, Fife, Scotland
- Occupations: Poet, antiquary, songwriter
- Parent(s): James Boswell; Margaret Montgomerie
- Relatives: James Boswell the Younger (brother)
- Writing career
- Language: Scots
- Notable works: Jenny's Bawbee; Jenny dang the Weaver

Sir Alexander Boswell, 1st Baronet, FRSE, FSA (9 October 1775 – 27 March 1822) was a Scottish poet, antiquary and songwriter. The son of Samuel Johnson's friend and biographer James Boswell of Auchinleck, he used the funds from his inheritance to pay for a seat in Parliament and then successfully sought a baronetcy for his political support of the government. However, his finances subsequently collapsed and he was revealed as the author of violent attacks on a rival. Boswell died as a result of wounds received in a duel; he was the last British MP to die in that manner.

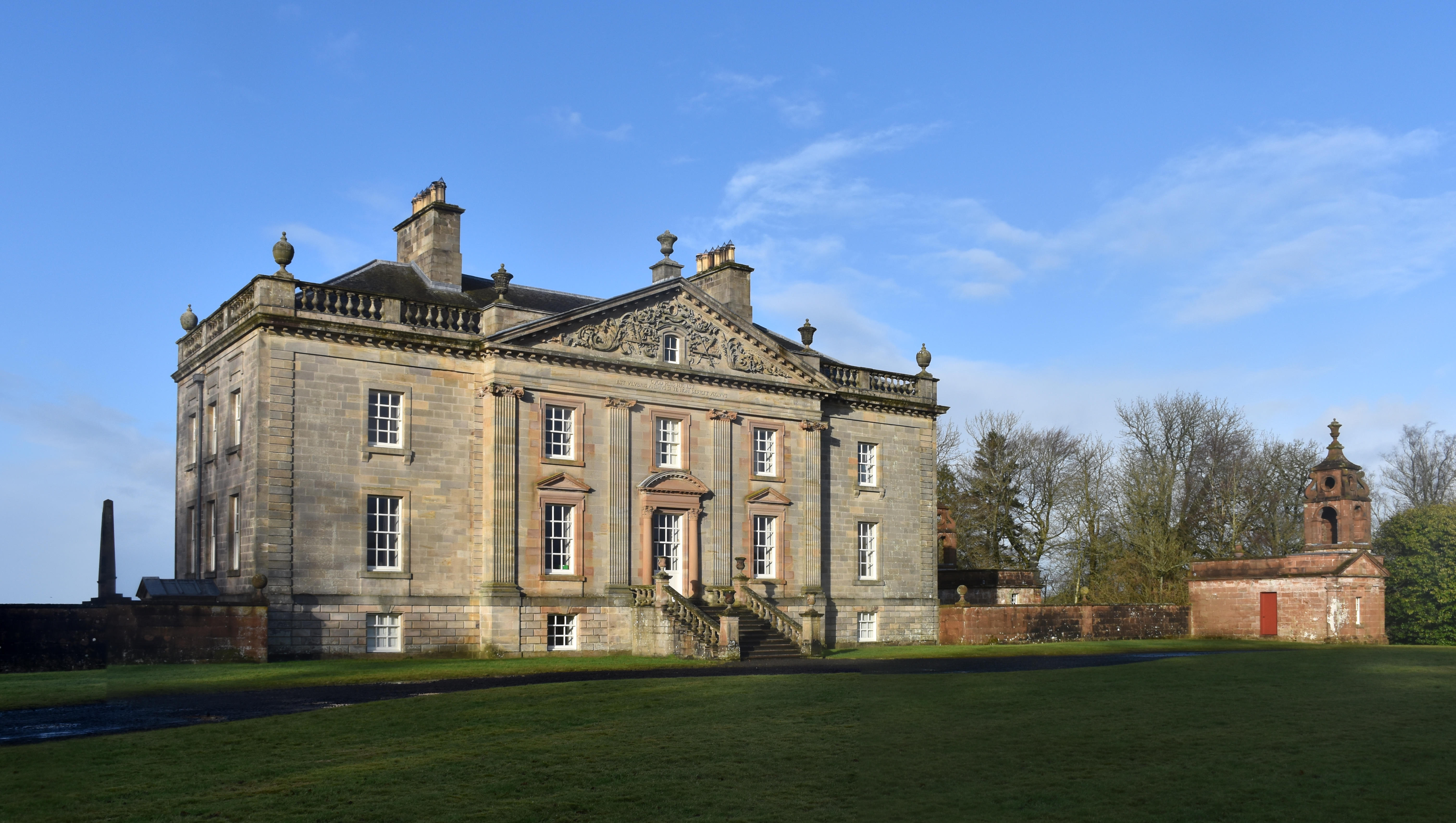
Auchinleck House

== Early life ==
Boswell was the eldest son of James Boswell of Auchinleck and Margaret Montgomerie of Lainshaw, and grandson of Alexander Boswell, Lord Auchinleck. He was born in Auchinleck House.

He attended Soho Academy in London in 1786 and Eton College from 1789 to 1792. Following his father's intention that he follow a legal career, he went to the University of Edinburgh in 1793. Shortly after his father's death he went to the University of Leipzig to study law, but soon dropped out of the course and visited Dresden and Berlin before returning to London in the summer of 1796. Boswell was a tall and muscular man who was thought by his sister to have exceeded his expectations. Having inherited land from his father, he took care of his inheritance and by 1801 the rents paid annually to him were more than his father had received. Boswell had an active interest in agriculture and was keen on country sports.

== Poetry ==
Having abandoned a legal career, Boswell developed his interest in old Scottish authors and became a poet and bibliophile, becoming friends with Walter Scott. In 1815 he established a private press at Auchinleck which printed the poetry of his circle. He wrote some popular Scottish songs, of which Jenny's Bawbee and Jenny dang the Weaver are the best known. He was also a captain in the Ayr yeomanry from 1803, promoted to major in 1815 and becoming the lieutenant-colonel commandant in 1816.

== Parliament ==
Boswell bought his entry to the House of Commons in 1816, paying Paul Treby who controlled one seat in the borough of Plympton Erle in Devon. In politics he was a staunch Tory, generally voting with the Government of the day; however, he developed a grudge against the ministers personally and against Prime Minister Lord Liverpool in particular. His complaint was that Liverpool had not given help to him in his search for a seat in Parliament, despite having "conscientiously supported the administration with more persevering punctuality than any paid man in office", as he wrote to Lord Sidmouth.

== Countering sedition ==
When Sidmouth as home secretary brought in the "Six Acts" against sedition following the Peterloo Massacre, Boswell turned up to speak on the Seditious Meetings Bill despite wanting to be on the spot to suppress sedition in Ayrshire with his yeomanry. He also spoke against reform of Scottish burgh government in 1819. In 1820 he was with the yeomanry and highly active in suppressing dissent, although he did not only use force in countering them. Boswell attended an Ayrshire meeting to vote a loyal address to King George IV over the Queen Caroline affair on 30 December 1820.

== Leaving Parliament ==
Having sought a baronetcy from the Government for his support, Boswell became angered when Liverpool's refusal to grant one was given good publicity. In November 1820 he was on the point of resigning his seat when Sidmouth implied that Liverpool might have rethought his opposition. However, he was then hit by a financial crisis in his once profitable land holdings: Boswell had made some bad decisions to buy land, and his rental income suffered in a poor economy. He also had the expense of equipping his yeomanry. It cost him £1,000 per session to remain in Parliament, and Boswell concluded that he could not afford it; he resigned in February 1821, the day after voting in support of the Government over Queen Caroline. Ironically that summer he received the baronetcy he had sought, in recognition of his loyalty.

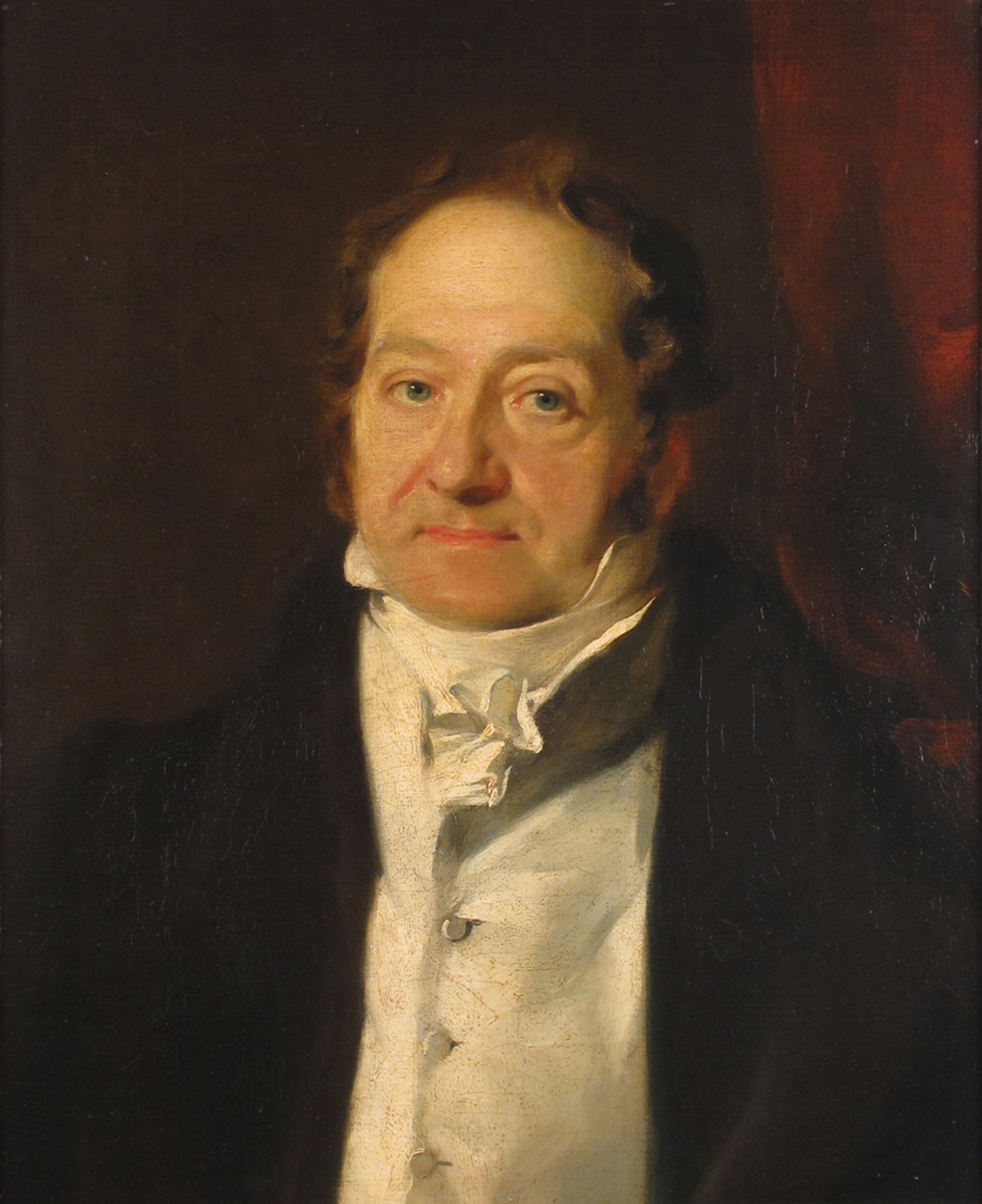
James Stuart by Daniel Macnee

== Death ==
After leaving Parliament, Boswell wrote a series of virulent but anonymous attacks in two Scottish newspapers, the Beacon and the Sentinel, attacking a prominent Whig (James Stuart of Dunearn) as a bully and a coward. When a legal fight broke out between the proprietors of the Sentinel, Stuart was able to get access to internal documents which indicated Boswell was probably the author. Stuart demanded that Boswell either deny authorship or apologise; Boswell refused to do either and as a result Stuart challenged him to a duel.

They met on 26 March 1822 at Auchtertool, near Kirkcaldy in Fife. Boswell deliberately fired wide, but Stuart, who had never before handled a gun, shot Boswell in the collarbone. Boswell was taken to Balmuto House, part of the Boswell family estate, and died the following day.

He left assets of £10,000 and debts of £72,000. Stuart was unanimously found not guilty of murder at his trial. More than 11,000 people attended Boswell's funeral and the funeral procession was over a mile long.

Parliament of the United Kingdom
Preceded by William Douglas; Ranald George Macdonald	Member of Parliament for Plympton Erle; 1816–1821; With: Ranald George Macdonald	Succeeded by Ranald George Macdonald; William Gill Paxton
Baronetage of the United Kingdom
New creation	Baronet (of Auchinleck, Ayrshire); 1821–1822	Succeeded by James Boswell
