= Margaret Boswell =

Scottish wife of James Boswell (1738–1789)

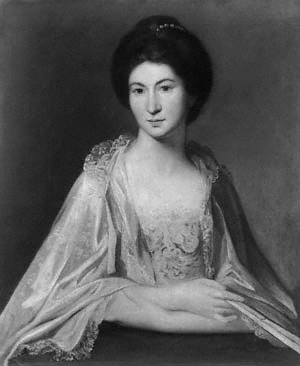
- by unknown
- Born: Margaret Montgomerie; 1738; Lainshaw, Scotland
- Died: 4 June 1789 (aged 50–51); Auchinleck, Scotland
- Spouse: James Boswell (m. 1769; died 1789)
- Children: Sir Alexander Boswell, 1st Baronet; James Boswell; Veronica Boswell; Euphemia Boswell; Elizabeth Boswell

Margaret Boswell (née Montgomerie; 1738 – 4 June 1789) was a Scottish woman who was the wife and cousin of the diarist James Boswell.

== Life ==
She was born in about 1738 at Lainshaw in Ayrshire. She was soon an orphan as her father James Boswell (seventh laird of Auchinleck) and her mother Lady Elizabeth (born Bruce) died while she was young. Her father's elder sister, Elizabeth, inherited, but they left her an annuity worth £1000 which would bring her an income of £100 every year. James was open with her before their marriage telling her of his "a disposition to melancholy and the most violent passion for the family of Auchinicck".

She married her first cousin who was James Boswell. They married in London and the witnesses to their marriage included Archibald Douglas, 1st Baron Douglas, the writer Samuel Johnson and the Corsican statesman Pasquale Paoli. The marriage contract is now held by Yale University. Once married their social life was based at their house in James Court in Edinburgh. Her substantial annuity did not prevent the couple from being in debt for all of their marriage. James described her as a "heathen goddess" who was treated to double standards. James berated her when he thought she was too friendly with men, but his friendliness with women resulted in two children Charles Boswell and Sally. Margaret would respond to his unfaithfulness by refusing his advances in "a divorce", but she would in time forgive him.

In 1783 she was at the family seat of Auchinleck House where she catalogued the valuable library of books at the house.

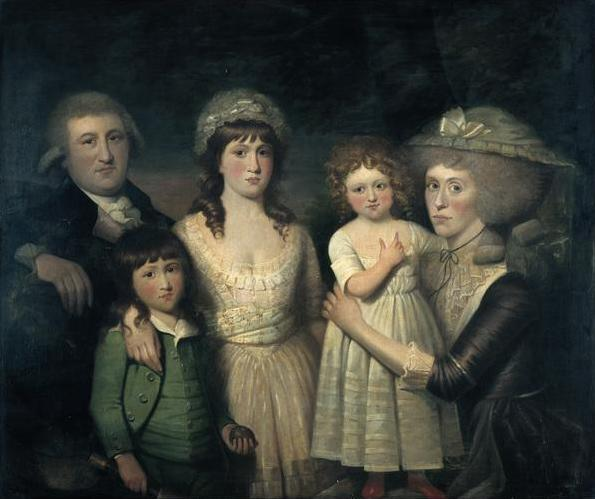
The family portrait by Henry Singleton

Henry Singleton created a group painting of Margaret's family in about 1786. On the left of the painting was her husband and she was on the right holding a six year old Elizabeth Boswell. The other two figures in the painting are Veronica and James (the younger).

Boswell died in Auchinleck on 4 June 1789 just before her husband arrived after rushing from London to be with her. James broke with tradition and he attended Margaret's funeral on the 11 June. Despite her annuity, James was in debt when she died. She was interred beneath the church, but her body was exhumed and moved later. Their children were Alexander, James the younger, Veronica, Euphemia and Elizabeth Boswell.
