= London Journal (Boswell) =

Diary (1762/63) of James Boswell

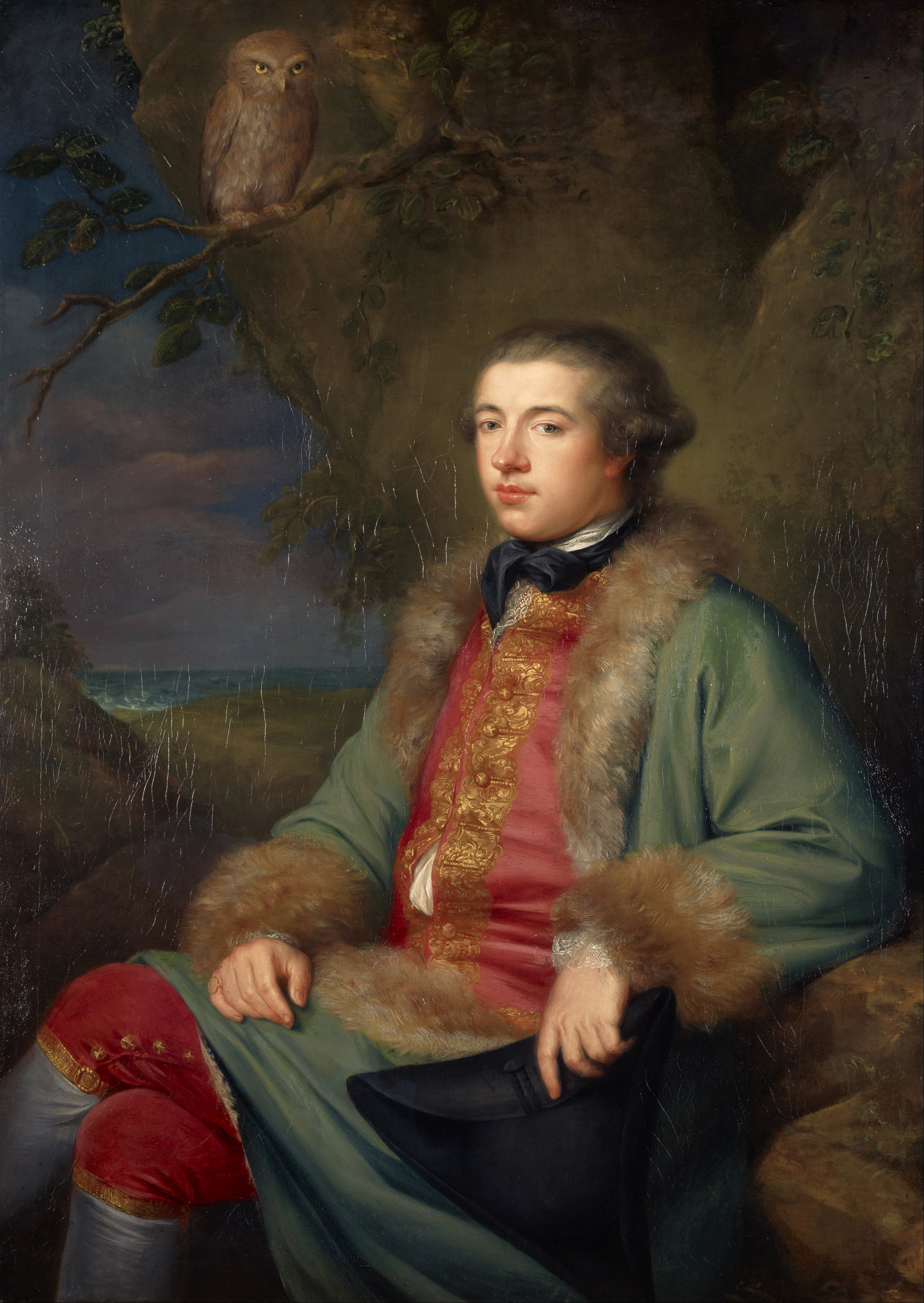
James Boswell

James Boswell's London Journal is a published version of the daily journal he kept between 1762 and 1763 while in London. Along with many more of his private papers, it was found in the 1920s at Malahide Castle in Ireland, and was first published in 1950, in an edition by Frederick A. Pottle. In it, Boswell, then a young Scotsman of 22, visits London for his second time. One of the most notable events in the journal is Boswell's meeting Samuel Johnson on 16 May, 1763. Boswell went on to form a close relationship with the famous writer, moralist, and lexicographer, eventually writing the 1791 biography The Life of Samuel Johnson.

The journal relates with much detail and candour his frequent and casual use of prostitutes. One of the more notorious events related is Boswell's meeting his mistress Louisa, whom he believes has given him gonorrhea:

BOSWELL. Pray, Madam, in what state of health have you been in for some time?

LOUISA. Sir, you amaze me.

BOSWELL. I have but too strong, too plain reason to doubt of your regard. I have for some days observed the symptoms of disease, but was unwilling to believe you so very ungenerous. But now, Madam, I am thoroughly convinced.

LOUISA. Sir, you have terrified me. I protest I know nothing of the matter.

BOSWELL. Madam, I have had no connection with any woman but you these two months. I was with my surgeon this morning, who declared I had got a strong infection, and that she from whom I had it could not be ignorant of it. Madam, such a thing in this case is worse than from a woman of the town, as from her you may expect it. You have used me very ill. I did not deserve it. You know you said where there was no confidence, there was no breach of trust. But surely I placed some confidence in you. I am sorry that I was mistaken.

LOUISA. Sir, I will confess to you that about three years ago I was very bad. But for these fifteen months I have been quite well. I appeal to GOD Almighty that I am speaking true; and for these six months I have had to do with no man but yourself.

BOSWELL. But by G-D, Madam, I have been with none but you, and here am I very bad.

LOUISA. Well, Sir, by the same solemn oath I protest that I was ignorant of it.

BOSWELL. Madam, I wish much to believe you. But I own I cannot upon this occasion believe a miracle.

LOUISA. Sir, I cannot say more to you. But you will leave me in the greatest misery. I shall lose your esteem. I shall be hurt in the opinion of everybody, and in my circumstances.

BOSWELL (to himself). What the devil does the confounded jilt mean by being hurt in her circumstances? This is the grossest cunning. But I won't take notice of that at all. – Madam, as to the opinion of everybody, you need not be afraid. I was going to joke and say that I never boast of a lady's favours. But I give you my word of honour that you shall not be discovered.

LOUISA. Sir, this is being more generous than I could expect.

The London Journal was but one of various journals written by Boswell, now gathered into a number of published volumes, but it is the only one whose material had not undergone extensive familial expurgation in the 19th century, and so it retained the racy material that made the London Journal an astonishing best seller on its publication. Fundamentally an "academic book", it sold over a million copies when it appeared as the first of the Yale Boswell publications in 1950. The manuscript was re-edited and comprehensively annotated in a new edition for Penguin Classics, by Gordon Turnbull, the general editor of the Yale Boswell Editions, in 2010.
