= James Boswell (1778–1822) =

18th/19th-century British barrister and editor

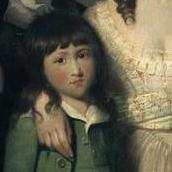
as a boy

James Boswell the Younger (1778 – 24 February 1822) was a barrister-at-law. He was the second surviving son of Samuel Johnson's biographer James Boswell.

== Early life and career ==
He was the second surviving son of Mary (born Montgomerie) and James Boswell.

Boswell received his early education at an academy in Soho Square and at Westminster School, and is spoken of by the elder Boswell as "an extraordinary boy, very much of his father", who destined him for the bar.

Entered at Brasenose College, Oxford, in 1797, he took his B.A. degree in 1801, proceeding M.A. in 1806, and was elected a fellow on the Vinerian foundation. While a student at Brasenose he contributed notes signed "J. B. O." to the third edition of his father's Life of Samuel Johnson, and afterwards carefully revised and corrected the text for the sixth edition (see Malone's Prefaces).

Called to the bar of the Inner Temple, 24 May 1805, he was afterwards appointed a commissioner of bankrupts.

== Literary work with Edmond Malone ==
He was from an early age close to his father's friend Edmond Malone, whom he assisted in collecting and arranging the materials for a second edition of his The Plays and Poems of William Shakespeare, and was requested by him in his last illness to complete it, a task which he duly performed. He contributed to The Gentleman's Magazine for June 1813 a memoir of Malone, which in 1814 he reprinted for private circulation.

One of the earliest members of the Roxburghe Club, he presented to it in 1816 a facsimile reprint of the poems of Richard Barnfield, and in 1817 A Roxburgh Garland, which consists of a few bacchanalian songs by seventeenth-century poets, and of which "L'Envoi", a convivial lyric in honour of the club, was composed by himself. In 1821 appeared under his editorship what is known as the third variorum Shakespeare, The Plays and Poems of William Shakespeare, with the corrections and illustrations of various commentators, comprehending a life of the poet and an enlarged history of the stage, by the late Edmond Malone, with a new glossarial index, 21 vols. Boswell contributed a long preliminary "advertisement", various readings and notes of no great importance, with the completion of Malone's "Essay on the Phraseology and Metre of Shakespeare" and the Glossarial Index. The collection of old English literature which Malone left Boswell to be used in the preparation of this edition was presented to the Bodleian Library by Malone's brother after Boswell's death.

== Death ==
Boswell died suddenly at his chambers in the Temple, unmarried and apparently in embarrassed circumstances, on 24 February 1822. He died a few weeks before the death, in a duel, of his brother Sir Alexander, who in a poetical tribute to his memory said of him that he had "never lost one friend or found one foe". John Gibson Lockhart, in his Life of Scott, describes Boswell as "a man of considerable learning, and of admirable social qualities", to whom, as to his brother Sir Alexander, Scott was "warmly attached". He belonged to the Albemarle Street circle of John Murray, who thought Boswell's favourable opinion of the first series of Scott's Tales of My Landlord "worth quoting to Scott, with those of Hallam and Hookham Frere".
