= James Boswell =

Scottish lawyer, diarist and author (1740–1795)

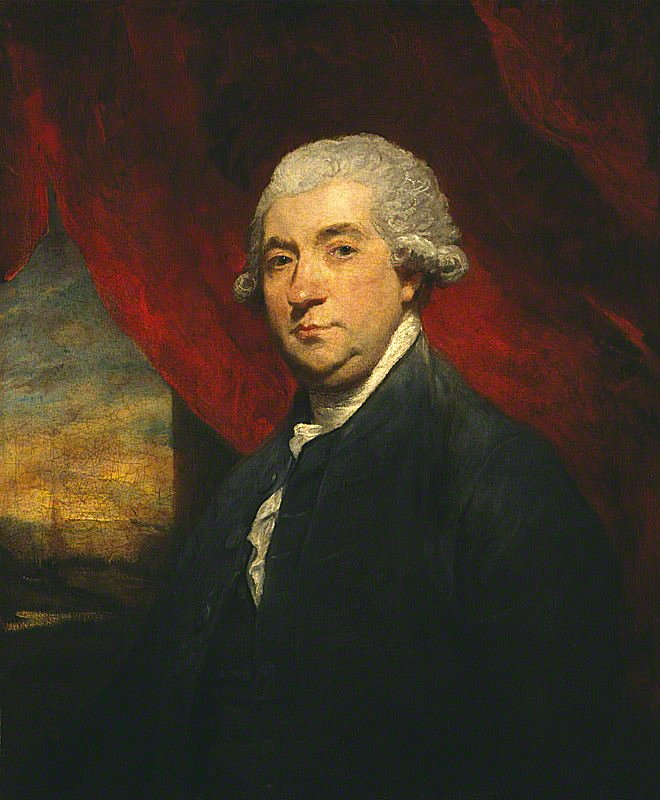
- Portrait of James Boswell by Sir Joshua Reynolds, 1785
- Born: 29 October 1740 (N.S.); Edinburgh, Scotland
- Died: 19 May 1795 (aged 54); London, England
- Education: University of Edinburgh; University of Glasgow; Utrecht University
- Occupations: Lawyer; diarist; biographer
- Spouse: Margaret Montgomerie (m. 1769; died 1789)
- Children: 7, including Alexander and James
- Writing career
- Years active: 1762–1791
- Notable work: Life of Johnson

James Boswell, 9th Laird of Auchinleck (/ˈbɒzwɛl, -wəl/; 29 October 1740 (N.S.) – 19 May 1795), was a Scottish biographer, diarist, and lawyer, born in Edinburgh. He is best known for his biography of the English writer Samuel Johnson, Life of Samuel Johnson, which is commonly said to be the greatest biography written in the English language. A great mass of Boswell's diaries, letters, and private papers were recovered from the 1920s to the 1950s, and their publication by Yale University significantly elevated his standing among modern scholars.

== Early life ==
Boswell was born in Blair's Land on the east side of Parliament Close behind St Giles' Cathedral in Edinburgh on 29 October 1740 (N.S.). He was the eldest son of a judge, Alexander Boswell, Lord Auchinleck, and his wife Euphemia Erskine. As the eldest son, he was heir to his family's estate of Auchinleck in Ayrshire. Boswell's mother was a strict Calvinist, and he felt that his father was cold to him. As a child, he was delicate. It has been suggested by Kay Jamison that he may have suffered from bipolar disorder, and this condition would afflict him sporadically all through his life. At the age of five, he was sent to James Mundell's academy, an advanced institution by the standards of the time, where he was instructed in English, Latin, writing and arithmetic.

The eight-year-old Boswell was unhappy there, and suffered from nightmares and extreme shyness. Consequently, he was removed from the academy and educated by a string of private tutors. The most notable and supportive of these, John Dunn, exposed Boswell to modern literature, such as The Spectator essays, and religion. Dunn was also present during Boswell's serious affliction of 1752, when he was confined to the town of Moffat in northern Dumfriesshire. This afforded Boswell his first experience of genuine society. His recovery was rapid and complete, and Boswell may have decided that travel and entertainment exerted a calming therapeutic effect on him.

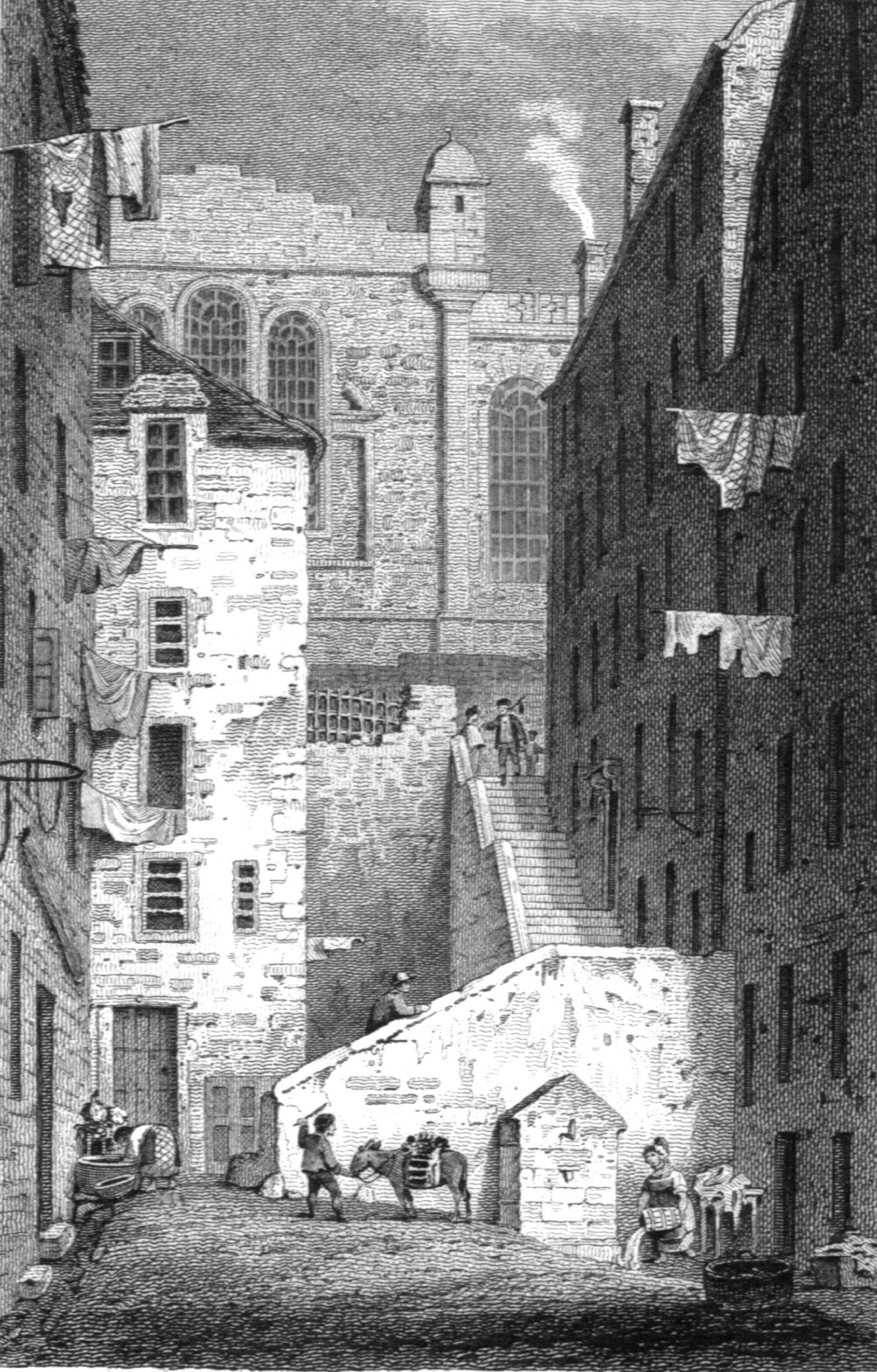
Boswell's Edinburgh. In his journals he often mentions using the "Back Stairs" behind Parliament Close. His birthplace was the family's town house on the east side of the close, just around the corner at the top of the steps.

At thirteen, Boswell was enrolled into the arts course at the University of Edinburgh, studying there from 1753 to 1758. Midway through his studies, he suffered an episode of serious depression but recovered fully. Boswell had swarthy skin, black hair and dark eyes; he was of average height, and he tended to plumpness. His appearance was said to be alert and masculine.

Upon turning nineteen, he was sent to continue his studies at the University of Glasgow, where he attended the lectures of Adam Smith. While at Glasgow, Boswell decided to convert to Catholicism and become a monk. Upon learning of this, his father ordered him home. Instead of obeying, though, Boswell ran away to London, where he spent three months, living the life of a libertine, before he was taken back to Scotland by his father. Upon returning, he was re-enrolled at Edinburgh University and forced by his father to sign away most of his inheritance in return for an allowance of £100 a year.

== To London and Europe ==
On 30 July 1762, Boswell passed his oral law exam, after which his father decided to raise his allowance to £200 a year and permitted him to return to London. Boswell had started keeping a careful journal, written in full, and the volume covering this period was published in 1950 as the London Journal. On 16 May 1763, Boswell met Johnson for the first time. The pair became friends almost immediately, though Johnson became more of a parental figure in Boswell's eyes.

In Boswell's Life of Johnson, he records the first conversational exchange between himself and Johnson as follows:

[Boswell:] "Mr Johnson, I do indeed come from Scotland, but I cannot help it."
[Johnson:] "That, Sir, I find, is what a very great many of your countrymen cannot help."

On 6 August, Boswell departed England for Europe, with the initial goal of continuing his law studies at Utrecht University. He spent a year there and although desperately unhappy the first few months, eventually quite enjoyed his time in Utrecht. He mixed with prominent families, and pursued his studies industriously. Boswell admired the young widow Geelvinck who refused to marry him. He befriended and fell in love with Isabelle de Charrière, also known as Belle van Zuylen, a vivacious young Dutchwoman of unorthodox opinions, his social and intellectual superior.

On 18 June 1764, Boswell set out from Utrecht by coach, and spent most of the next two years travelling around the continent, his Grand Tour. He travelled through Germany, Switzerland, Italy, Corsica and France. He arranged to meet European intellectuals Jean-Jacques Rousseau and Voltaire with a recommendation letter of Constant d'Hermenches, and made a pilgrimage to Rome, where his portrait was painted by George Willison. Boswell also travelled to Corsica and spent seven weeks there, meeting the Corsican resistance leader Pasquale Paoli, and sending reports to London newspapers. His diaries and correspondence of this time have been compiled into two books, Boswell in Holland and Boswell on the Grand Tour.

== Mature life ==
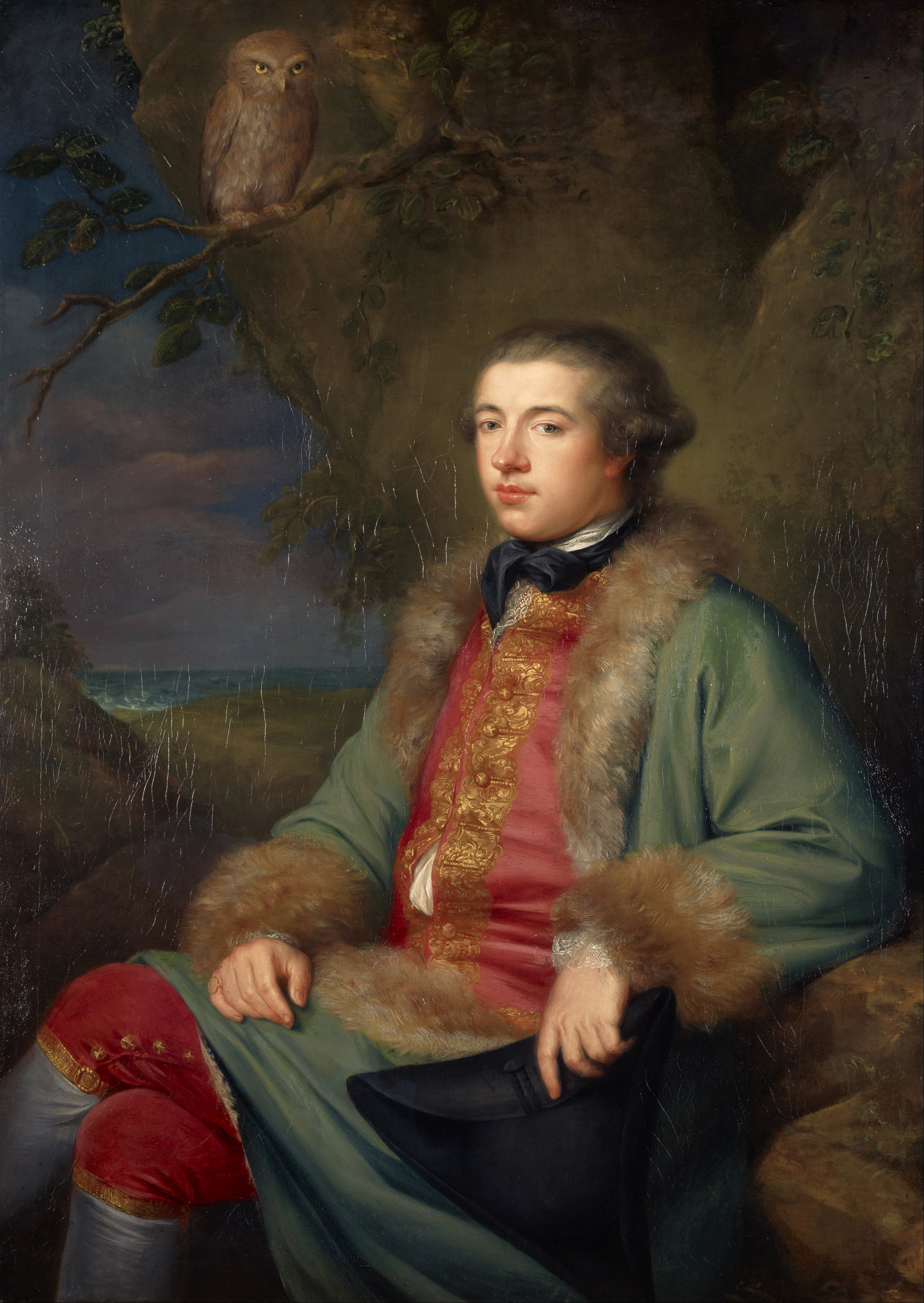
James Boswell by George Willison in Rome in 1765. Scottish National Gallery, Edinburgh

Boswell returned to London in February 1766 accompanied by Rousseau's mistress Thérèse Levasseur, with whom he had a brief affair on the journey home. After spending a few weeks in the capital, he returned to Scotland, buying (or perhaps renting) the former house of David Hume on James Court on the Lawnmarket. He studied for his final law exam at Edinburgh University. He passed the exam and became an advocate. He practised the law in Edinburgh for over a decade, and most years spent his annual break in London, mingling with Johnson and many other London-based writers, editors, and printers, and furthering his literary ambitions. He contributed a great many items to newspapers and magazines, in London and Edinburgh. He found enjoyment in playing the intellectual rhyming game crambo with his peers.

In 1768 he published An account of Corsica, the journal of a tour to that island, and memoirs of Pascal Paoli. The book contained both a history and description of Corsica, as well as an account of his visit. Boswell was a major supporter of the Corsican Republic. Following the island's invasion by France in 1768, Boswell attempted to raise public awareness and rally support for the Corsicans. He sent arms and money to the Corsican fighters, who were ultimately defeated at the Battle of Ponte Novu in 1769. Boswell attended the masquerade held at the Shakespeare Jubilee in Stratford-upon-Avon in September 1769 dressed as a Corsican Chief. He was also, much to the chagrin of his friend Johnson, a strong defender of the American Revolution.

Some of his journal entries and letters from this period describe his amatory exploits. Thus, in 1767, in a letter to William Johnson Temple, he wrote, "I got myself quite intoxicated, went to a Bawdy-house and past a whole night in the arms of a Whore. She indeed was a fine strong spirited Girl, a Whore worthy of Boswell if Boswell must have a whore." A few years earlier, he wrote that during a night with an actress named Louisa, "five times was I fairly lost in supreme rapture. Louisa was madly fond of me; she declared I was a prodigy and asked me if this was not extraordinary for human nature." Though he sometimes used a condom for protection, he contracted venereal disease at least seventeen times.

Boswell married his cousin, Margaret Montgomerie, on 25 November 1769. She remained faithful to Boswell, despite his frequent liaisons with prostitutes, until her death from tuberculosis in 1789. After his infidelities, he would deliver tearful apologies to her and beg her forgiveness, before again promising her, and himself, that he would reform. James and Margaret had four sons and three daughters. Two sons died in infancy; the other two were Alexander (1775–1822) and James (1778–1822). Their daughters were Veronica (1773–1795), Euphemia (1774 – c. 1834) and Elizabeth, known as 'Betsy', (1780–1814). Boswell also had at least two extramarital children, Charles (1762–1764) and Sally (1767 – c. 1768).

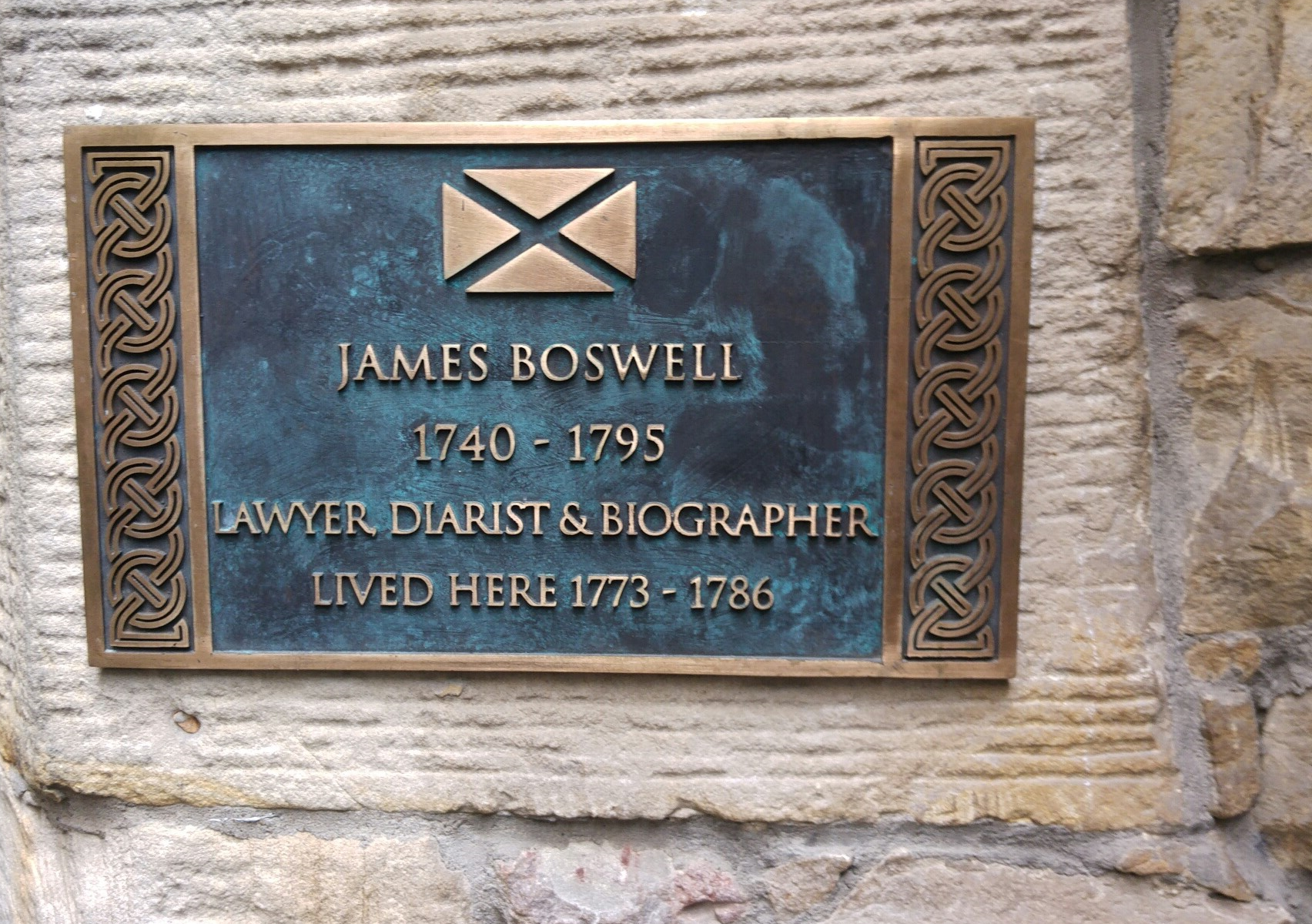
A commemorative plaque to Boswell at his former home at James Court, Lawnmarket, Edinburgh

Despite his relative literary success with accounts of his European travels, Boswell was only a moderately successful advocate, with the exception of the copyright infringement case of Donaldson v Beckett, where Boswell represented the Scottish bookseller Alexander Donaldson. By the late 1770s, Boswell descended further and further into alcoholism and gambling addiction. Throughout his life, from childhood until death, he was beset by severe swings of mood. His depressions frequently encouraged and were exacerbated by his various vices. His happier periods usually saw him relatively vice-free. His character mixed a superficial Enlightenment sensibility for reason and taste with a genuine and somewhat romantic love of the sublime and a propensity for occasionally puerile whimsy. The latter, along with his tendency for drink and other vices, caused many contemporaries and later observers to regard him as being too lightweight to be an equal in the literary crowd that he wanted to be a part of. However, his humour and innocent good nature won him many lifelong friends.

In 1773 Boswell bought the house of David Hume (who moved to a new house on South St David Street/St Andrew Square) on the south east corner of James Court. He lived there until 1786. Boswell's residency at James Court has been well established, but not the exact location. For example, a later edition of Traditions of Edinburgh by Robert Chambers suggests that Boswell's residence at James Court was actually in the Western wing. His James Court flat was notable for having two levels, and although a modern renovation in the Eastern section reveals such a possibility, it is likely that Boswell's residence was a similarly equipped one in the Western section that no longer exists, having burned down in the mid 1800s.

=== Earl of Dumfries ===
Boswell became quite friendly with the 6th Earl of Dumfries. As well as seeing him in Scotland, he also visited him in Rosemount, London in 1787 and 1788. In Boswell's journal of November 2, 1778, he writes, "[The Earl of Dumfries] was exceedingly attentive to me [...] I was upon my guard, as I well knew that he and his Countess flattered themselves that they would get from me that road through our estate which my father had refused, and which in truth I was still more positive for refusing". He saw the Earl as "very attentive".

Having hosted the Earl, Boswell and his wife also decide to visit Dumfries House "[o]ur visit was a little awkward, as there had been no communication between the families for several of the last years of my father's life [...] I, however, wished to live on civil terms with such near neighbours".

On October 27, 1782, Boswell writes, "we looked at Lord Dumfries's gate and the famous road. [...] I showed him that granting it would make the Auchinleck improvements appear part of the Earl of Dumfries's domains. [...] If Lord Eglinton – if my Earl – were Earl of Dumfries and living at Dumfries House, he should have the road, but not to him and his heirs."

=== Later life ===
Boswell was a frequent guest of Lord Monboddo at Monboddo House, a setting where he gathered significant observations for his writings by association with Samuel Johnson, Lord Kames and other notable attendees.

After Johnson's death in 1784, Boswell moved to London to try his luck at the English Bar, which proved even less successful than his career in Scotland. In 1792 Boswell lobbied the Home Secretary to help gain royal pardons for four Botany Bay escapees, including Mary Bryant. He also offered to stand for Parliament but failed to get the necessary support, and he spent the final years of his life writing his Life of Samuel Johnson.

During this time his health began to fail due to venereal disease and his years of drinking. Boswell died in London in 1795. Close to the end of his life he became strongly convinced that the "Shakespeare papers", including two previously unknown plays Vortigern and Rowena and Henry II, allegedly discovered by William Henry Ireland, were genuine. After Boswell's death they proved to be forgeries created by Ireland himself. Boswell's remains were interred in the crypt of the Boswell family mausoleum in what is now the old Auchinleck Kirkyard in Ayrshire. The mausoleum is attached to the old Auchinleck kirk.

== Life of Samuel Johnson ==
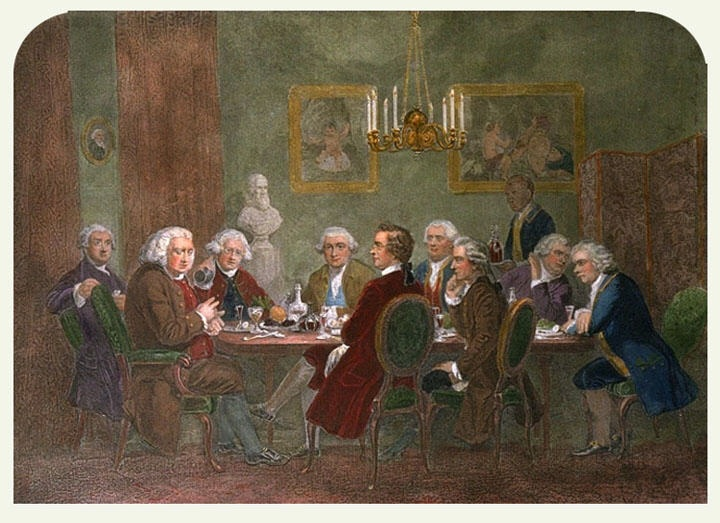
A literary party at Sir Joshua Reynolds' – 1781. The painting shows the friends of Reynolds including Boswell at left.

When the Life of Samuel Johnson was published in 1791, its style was unique in that, unlike other biographies of that era, it directly incorporated conversations that Boswell had noted down at the time for his journals. He also included more personal and human details than those to which contemporary readers were accustomed. Instead of writing a strictly fact-based record of Johnson's public life in the style of the time, he painted a more personal and intimate portrait of the man than was normal in biographies of the day.

Macaulay and Carlyle, among others, have attempted to explain how a man such as Boswell could have produced a work as detailed as the Life of Johnson. The former argued that Boswell's uninhibited folly and candour were his greatest qualifications; the latter replied that beneath such traits was a mind to discern excellence and a heart to appreciate it, aided by the power of accurate observation and considerable dramatic ability.

== Position on slavery ==
Boswell was present at the meeting of the Committee for the Abolition of the Slave Trade in May 1787 set up to persuade William Wilberforce to lead the abolition movement in Parliament. However, the abolitionist Thomas Clarkson records that by 1788 Boswell "after having supported the cause ... became inimical to it". Boswell's most prominent display of support for slavery was his 1791 poem "No Abolition of Slavery; or the Universal Empire of Love", which lampooned Clarkson, Wilberforce and Pitt. The poem also supports the common suggestion of the pro-slavery movement, that the slaves actually enjoyed their lot: "The cheerful gang! – the negroes see / Perform the task of industry."

== Discovery and publication of Boswell's private papers ==
In the 1920s a great part of Boswell's private papers, including intimate journals for much of his life, were discovered at Malahide Castle, north of Dublin. These provide a hugely revealing insight into the life and thoughts of the man. They were sold to the American collector Ralph H. Isham and have since passed to Yale University, which has published popular and scholarly editions of his journals and correspondence, mostly edited by Frederick A. Pottle. A second cache was discovered soon after and also purchased by Isham. A substantially longer edition of The Journal of a Tour to the Hebrides was published in 1936 based on his original manuscript, edited by L. F. Powell. His London Journal 1762–63, the first of the Yale journal publications, appeared in 1950. The last popular edition, The Great Biographer, 1789–1795, was published in 1989. Publication of the research edition of Boswell's journals and letters, each including never before published material, was ceased by Yale University in June 2021, prior to the completion of the project.

These detailed and frank journals include voluminous notes on the Grand Tour of Europe that he took as a young man and, subsequently, of his tour of Scotland with Johnson. His journals also record meetings and conversations with eminent individuals belonging to The Club, including Lord Monboddo, David Garrick, Edmund Burke, Joshua Reynolds and Oliver Goldsmith.

He has been noted for his attention to emotional nuance and subtle, fleeting sentiments, qualities that some critics argue distinguished his work from that of many contemporary authors.

== Freemasonry ==
Boswell was initiated into Freemasonry in Lodge Canongate Kilwinning on 14 August 1759. He subsequently became Master of that Lodge in 1773 and in that year was Senior Grand Warden of the Grand Lodge of Scotland. From 1776 to 1777 he was the Depute Grand Master of that Grand Lodge.

== In fiction and popular culture ==
Boswell's surname has passed into the English language as a term (Boswell, Boswellian, Boswellism) for a constant companion and observer, especially one who records those observations in print. In "A Scandal in Bohemia", Sir Arthur Conan Doyle's character Sherlock Holmes affectionately says of Dr. Watson, who narrates the tales, "I am lost without my Boswell."

The comedy Young Auchinleck (1962) by Scottish playwright Robert McLellan depicts Boswell's various courtships and troubled relations with his father in the period after his return to Scotland in 1766, culminating in his eventual marriage to his cousin Margaret Montgomery (Peggy) in 1769 on the same day as his father's second marriage in a different part of the country. The play was first produced at the Edinburgh International Festival in 1962 and adapted for BBC Television in 1965.

In 1981 the cartoonist R. Crumb published the piece "Boswell's London Journal" in the anthology magazine Weirdo. Presented as a "Klassic Komic," the piece featured meticulous cross-hatched illustrations and excerpts from Boswell's writing to tell a satirical story of the young Boswell attempting to establish himself in London society, dallying with prostitutes and suffering from venereal disease.

Boswell was played by John Sessions in Boswell & Johnson's Tour of the Western Isles, a 1993 BBC 2 play.

In February and March 2015, BBC Radio 4 broadcast three episodes of "Boswell's Lives", writer Jon Canter's comedic take on Boswell meeting later historical figures (Sigmund Freud, Maria Callas and Harold Pinter, respectively) for the purposes of biographing them. Boswell was played by Miles Jupp. A further four episodes of "Boswell's Lives" were broadcast in March and April 2016, this time featuring comedic takes of Boswell meeting Muhammad Ali, Karl Marx, Madonna and Alan Bennett.

American novelist Philip Baruth wrote a fictional account of James Boswell's early life in The Brothers Boswell (Soho Press 2009). The novel, which includes scenes that feature Samuel Johnson, is a thriller that focuses on the tense relationship between James and his younger brother John. Boswell also features as a character in James Robertson's novel, Joseph Knight (2003).

Wisconsin playwright Marie Kohler wrote Boswell which was produced at the Edinburgh Festival Fringe in 2019, then at 59E59 Theaters Off-Broadway in New York City (2022). The most recent run is currently (as of this writing, December 2025) at Next Act Theatre, Milwaukee, Wisconsin. Focussing on Boswell's tour of Scotland with Samuel Johnson, Director Laura Gordon's program note tells us this is a "play about friendship, travel and trust that reminds us to make the most of every day and challenges us to not take a single moment for granted."

== Major works ==
- The Cub at Newmarket (1762, published by James Dodsley)
- Letters Between the Honourable Andrew Erskine, and James Boswell, Esq. (1763)
- Dorando, a Spanish Tale (1767, anonymously)
- Account of Corsica, The Journal of a Tour to That Island, and Memoirs of Pascal Paoli (1768)
  Account of Corsica, 1768
- "The Rampager" (1770–82, a series of 20 essays published sporadically in the Public Advertiser)
- The Hypochondriack (1777–83, a series of 70 essays published monthly in the London Magazine)
- The Journal of a Tour to the Hebrides with Samuel Johnson, LL.D (1785)
- The Life of Samuel Johnson, LL.D (2 vols. 1791, 2nd edition: 3 vols. July 1793) - reprinted in Everyman's Library
- No Abolition of Slavery (1791) (poem)

== Published journals ==
After Boswell's private papers were recovered, and brought together by Ralph Isham, they were acquired by Yale University, where a dedicated office was established to edit and publish his journals and correspondence. The journals have been published in 13 volumes, as follows.

- Boswell's London Journal, 1762–1763, ed. F. A. Pottle (1950)
- Boswell in Holland, 1763–1764, including his correspondence with Belle de Zuylen (Zelide), ed. F. A. Pottle (1952)
- Boswell on the Grand Tour: Germany and Switzerland, 1764, ed. F. A. Pottle (1953)
- Boswell on the Grand Tour: Italy, Corsica, and France, 1765–1766, ed. Frank Brady and F. A. Pottle (1955)
- Boswell in Search of a Wife, 1766–1769, ed. Frank Brady and F. A. Pottle (1957)
- Boswell for the Defence, 1769–1774, ed. W. A. Wimsatt and F. A. Pottle (1960)
- Boswell: the Ominous Years, 1774–1776, ed. Charles Ryskamp and F. A. Pottle (1963)
- Boswell in Extremes, 1776–1778, ed. C. McC. Weis and F. A. Pottle (1970)
- Boswell, Laird of Auchinleck, 1778–1782, ed. J. W. Reed and F. A. Pottle (1977)
- Boswell: The Applause of the Jury, 1782–1785, ed. I. S. Lustig and F. A. Pottle (1981)
- Boswell: The English Experiment, 1785–1789, ed. I. S. Lustig and F. A. Pottle (1986)
- Boswell: The Great Biographer, 1789–1795, ed. Marlies K. Danziger and Frank Brady (1989)
