= Life of Samuel Johnson =

1791 biography of Samuel Johnson by James Boswell

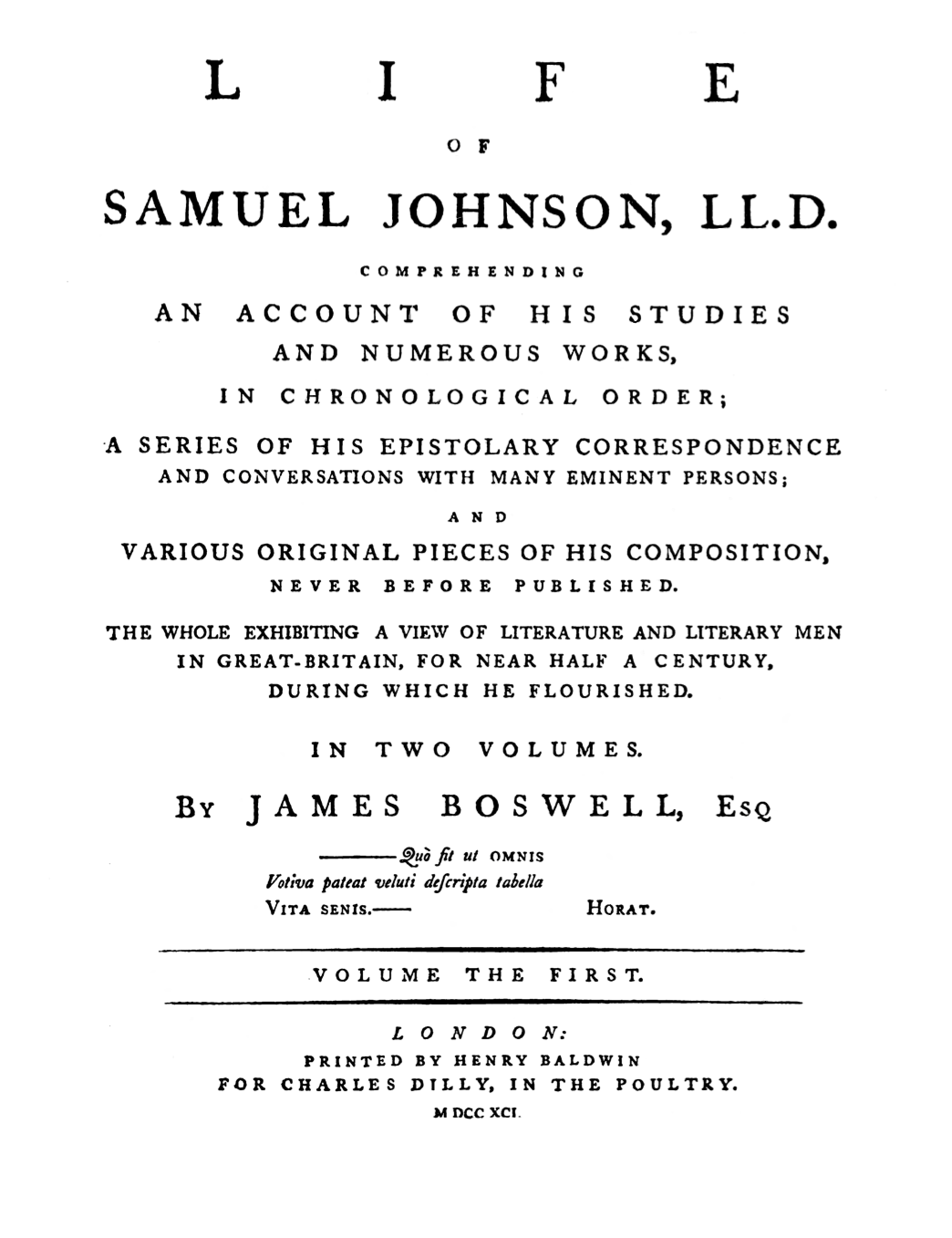
- Author: James Boswell
- Original title: The Life of Samuel Johnson, LL.D.
- Language: English
- Subject: Samuel Johnson
- Genre: Biography
- Publication date: 1791
- Publication place: United Kingdom
- Text: Life of Samuel Johnson at Wikisource

The Life of Samuel Johnson, LL.D. by James Boswell is a 1791 biography of English writer and literary critic Samuel Johnson. The work was from the beginning a universal critical and popular success, and represents a landmark in the development of the modern genre of biography. Many have called it the greatest biography written in English, one of the greatest biographies ever written, and among the greatest nonfiction books of all time. The book is valued as both an important source of information on Johnson and his times, as well as an important and enduring work of literature.

== Background ==
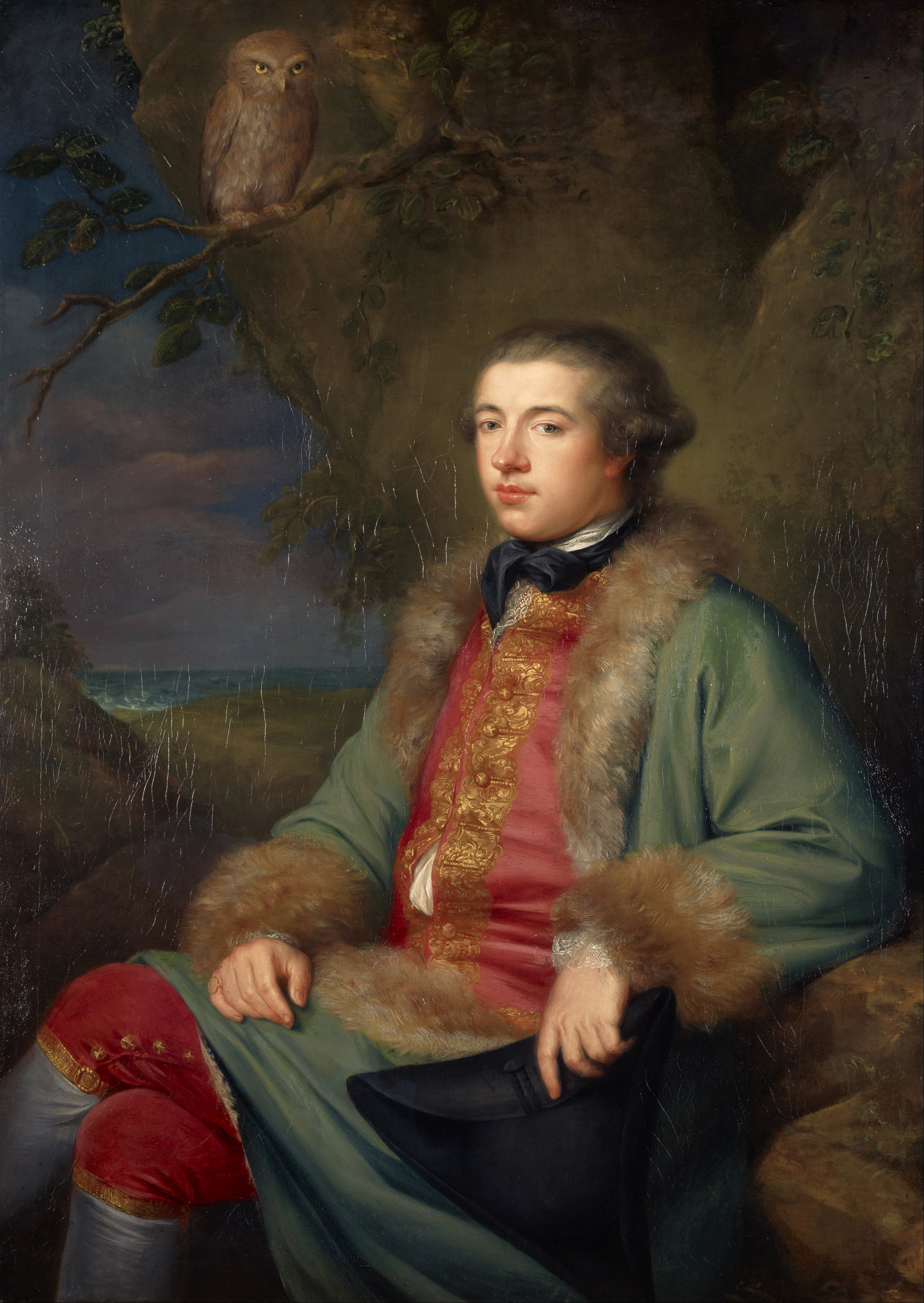
James Boswell at 25, by George Willison

On 16 May 1763, as a 22-year-old Scot visiting London, Boswell first met Johnson in the book shop of Johnson's friend Tom Davies. They quickly became friends, although for many years they met only when Boswell visited London in the intervals of his law practice in Scotland. From the age of 20, Boswell kept a series of journals thoroughly detailing his day-to-day experience. This journal, when published in the 20th century, filled eighteen volumes, and it was on this large collection of detailed notes that Boswell would base his works on Johnson's life. Johnson, in commenting on Boswell's excessive note-taking, playfully wrote to Hester Thrale, "One would think the man had been hired to spy upon me".

On 6 August 1773, eleven years after first meeting Boswell, Johnson set out to visit his friend in Scotland, to begin "a journey to the western islands of Scotland", as Johnson's 1775 account of their travels would put it. Boswell's account, The Journal of a Tour to the Hebrides (1785), published after Johnson's death, was a trial of Boswell's biographical method before commencing his Life of Johnson. With the success of the Journal, Boswell started working on the "vast treasure of his conversations at different times" that he recorded in his journals. His goal was to recreate Johnson's "life in scenes". Because Johnson was 53 when Boswell first met him, the last 20 years of Johnson's life occupy four fifths of the book. Furthermore, as literary critic Donald Greene has pointed out, Boswell could have spent no more than 250 days with Johnson and, therefore, had to have drawn the rest of the material for the Life either from Johnson himself or from secondary sources recounting various incidents.

Before Boswell could publish his Life of Johnson, other friends of Johnson's published or prepared their own biographies or collections of anecdotes on Johnson: John Hawkins, Thrale, Frances Burney, Anna Seward, Elizabeth Montagu, Hannah More, and Horace Walpole among many. The last edition Boswell worked on was the third, published after his death, in 1799.

== Biography ==
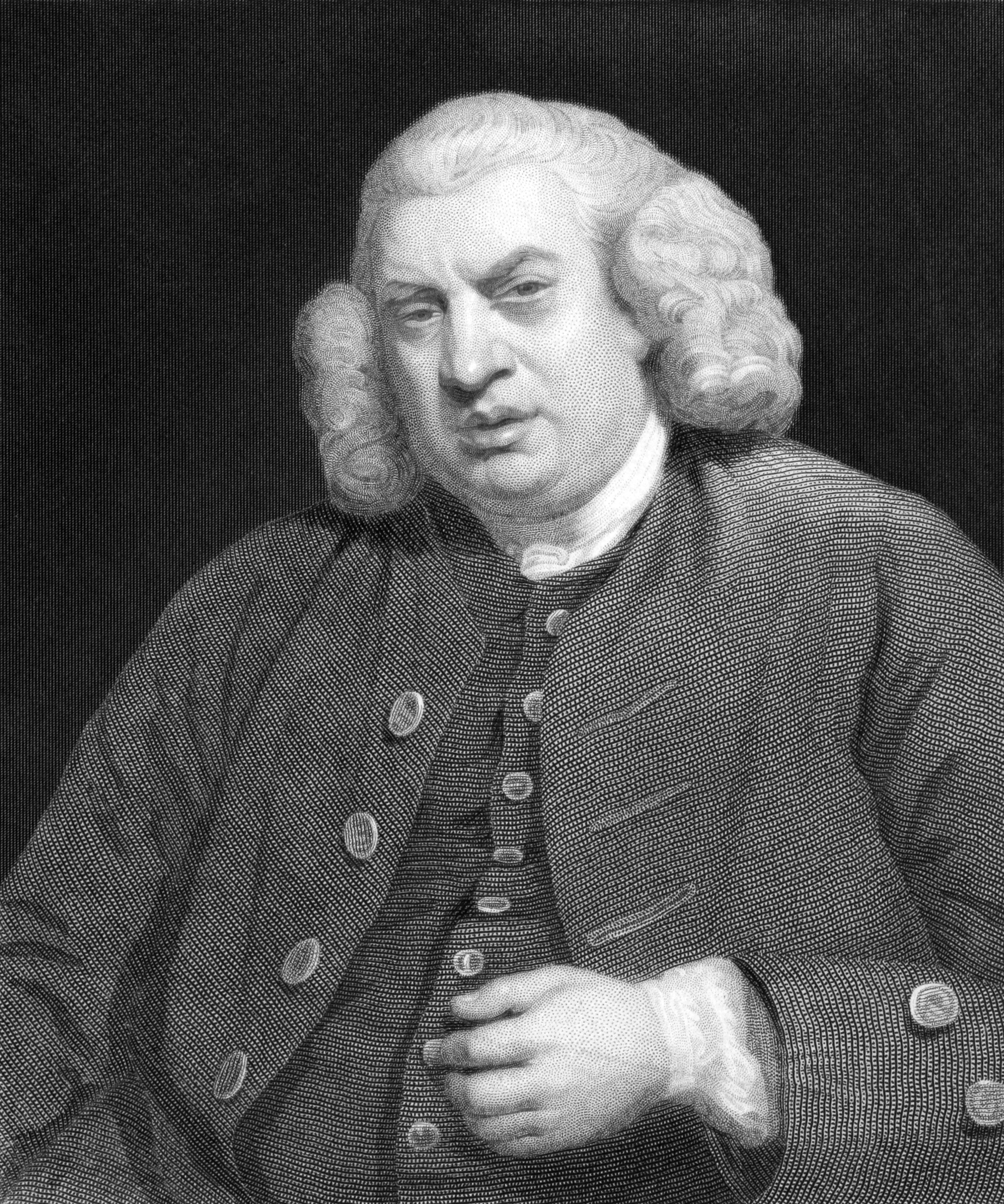
Samuel Johnson in his later years

There are many biographies and biographers of Samuel Johnson, but James Boswell's Life of Samuel Johnson is the best known and most widely read today. Since first publication, it has passed through hundreds of editions and, on account of its great length, many selections and abridgements. Yet opinion among 20th-century Johnson scholars such as Edmund Wilson and Donald Greene is that Boswell's Life "can hardly be termed a biography at all", being merely "a collection of those entries in Boswell's diaries dealing with the occasions during the last twenty-two years of Johnson's life on which they met ... strung together with only a perfunctory effort to fill the gaps". Furthermore, Greene claims that the work "began with a well-organized press campaign, by Boswell and his friends, of puffing and of denigration of his rivals; and was given a boost by one of Macaulay's most memorable pieces of journalistic claptrap". Instead of being called a "biography", Greene suggests that the work should be called an "Ana", a sort of table talk. Boswell's original Life, moreover, "corrects" many of Johnson's quotations, censors many of the more vulgar comments, and largely ignores Johnson's early years.

According to American academician William Dowling, the image of Johnson that Boswell creates features elements of "myth":

In a sense, the Life's portrayal of Johnson as a moral hero begins in myth ... As the biographical story unfolds, of course, this image dissolves and there emerges the figure of an infinitely more complex and heroic Johnson whose moral wisdom is won through a constant struggle with despair, whose moral sanity is balanced by personal eccentricities too visible to be ignored, and whose moral penetration derives from his own sense of tragic self-deception. Yet the image never dissolves completely, for in the end we realize there has been an essential truth in the myth all along, that the idealized and disembodied image of Johnson existing in the mind of his public ... In this way the myth serves to expand and authenticate the more complex image of Johnson".

Modern biographers have since corrected Boswell's errors. This is not to say that Boswell's work is wrong or of no use: scholars such as Walter Jackson Bate appreciate the "detail" and the "treasury of conversation" that it contains. All of Johnson's biographers, according to Bate, have to go through the same "igloo" of material that Boswell had to deal with: limited information about Johnson's first forty years, and an abundance after. Simply put, "Johnson's life continues to hold attention" and "every scrap of evidence relating to Johnson's life has continued to be examined and many more details have been added" because "it is so close to general human experience in a wide variety of ways".

== Critical response ==
Edmund Burke told King George III that the work entertained him more than any other. Robert Anderson, in his Works of the British Poets (1795), wrote: "With some venial exceptions on the score of egotism and indiscriminate admiration, his work exhibits the most copious, interesting, and finished picture of the life and opinions of an eminent man, that was ever executed; and is justly esteemed one of the most instructive and entertaining books in the English language."

John Neal praised Boswell's style in The Portico in 1818. The essay was republished in Emerson's United States Magazine in 1856.

Boswell knew that the charm of Biography is a certain capricious levity that follows all the rambling of conversation; that the Biographer should be utterly forgotten; that the reader should feel acquainted with the man of whom he reads, without remembering a single word that he has read: — but in the execution of these just conceptions, Boswell is continually jogging your elbow, and begging you to forget him; he is incessantly crowding upon your notice. In making you intimately acquainted with his hero, Boswell is not satisfied with telling you, when Samuel Johnson is not like other men upon any occasion; but he overwhelms you with his proofs, that he is like other men, on occasions when every man, hero or not hero, must act like his neighbour. Boswell is not only the Biographer of Johnson in his closet; but he is the biographer of the human species in their most secret retirement.

=== 19th-century criticism ===
Macaulay's critique in the Edinburgh Review was highly influential and established a way of thinking of Boswell and his Life of Johnson which was to prevail for many years. Macaulay was damning of Croker's editing: "This edition is ill compiled, ill arranged, ill written, and ill printed". And the famously ambivalent opinion Macaulay gave of Boswell himself was that the unquestioned excellence of the Life was possible only because of traits and habits of Boswell's that Macaulay saw as contemptible: "Servile and impertinent, shallow and pedantic, a bigot and a sot, bloated with family pride, and eternally blustering about the dignity of a born gentleman, yet stooping to be a talebearer, an eavesdropper, a common butt in the taverns of London[;] ... such was this man, and such he was content and proud to be". Macaulay also claimed "Boswell is the first of biographers. He has no second. He has distanced all his competitors so decidedly that it is not worth while to place them". Macaulay also criticised (as did Lockhart) what he saw as a lack of discretion in the way the Life reveals Johnson's and others' personal lives, foibles, habits and private conversation; but contended that it was this that made the Life of Johnson a great biography.

Without all the qualities which made him the jest and the torment of those among whom he lived, without the officiousness, the inquisitiveness, the effrontery, the toad-eating, the insensitivity to all reproof, he could never have produced so excellent a book. He was a slave, proud of his servitude, a Paul Pry, convinced that his own curiosity and garrulity were virtues, an unsafe companion who never scrupled to repay the most liberal hospitality by the basest violation of confidence, a man without delicacy, without shame, without sense enough to know when he was hurting the feelings of others or when he was exposing himself to derision; and because he was all this, he has, in an important department of literature, immeasurably surpassed such writers as Tacitus, Clarendon, Alfieri, and his own idol Johnson.

Macaulay noted that Boswell could give a detailed account only of Johnson's later years: "We know him [Johnson], not as he was known to men of his own generation, but as he was known to men whose father he might have been" and that long after Johnson's own works had been forgotten, he would be remembered through Boswell's Life:

... that strange figure which is as familiar to us as the figures of those among whom we have been brought up, the gigantic body, the huge massy face, seamed with the scars of disease, the brown coat, the black worsted stockings, the grey wig with the scorched foretop, the dirty hands, the nails bitten and pared to the quick. We see the eyes and mouth moving with convulsive twitches; we see the heavy form rolling; we hear it puffing; and then comes the "Why sir!" and "What then, sir?" and the "No, sir!" and the "You don't see your way through the question, sir!" What a singular destiny has been that of this remarkable man! To be regarded in his own age as a classic, and in ours as a companion. To receive from his contemporaries that full homage which men of genius have in general received only from posterity! To be more intimately known to posterity than other men are known to their contemporaries! That kind of fame which is commonly the most transient is, in his case, the most durable. The reputation of those writings, which he probably expected to be immortal, is every day fading; while those peculiarities of manner and that careless table-talk the memory of which, he probably thought, would die with him, are likely to be remembered as long as the English language is spoken in any quarter of the globe ..."

Thomas Carlyle wrote two essays in Fraser's Magazine in 1832 in review of Croker's edition. The first of Carlyle's two essays, on 'Biography', appeared in issue 27, with the second, 'Boswell's Life of Johnson', in issue 28. Carlyle wanted more than facts from histories and biographies: "The thing I want to see is not Redbook Lists and Court Calendars, and Parliamentary Registers, but the LIFE OF MAN in England: what men did, thought, suffered, enjoyed; the form, especially the spirit, of their terrestrial existence, its outward environment, its inward principle; how and what it was; whence it proceeded, whither it was tending." Carlyle professed to find this in the Life, even in its simplest anecdotes: "Some slight, perhaps mean and even ugly incident if real and well presented, will fix itself in a susceptive memory and lie ennobled there". Consequently, "This Book of Boswell’s will give us more real insight into the History of England during those days that twenty other Books, falsely entitled “Histories” which take to themselves that special aim". "How comes it," Carlyle asked, "that in England we have simply one good Biography, this Boswell’s Johnson?" Carlyle shared Macaulay's unfavourable verdict on Croker's editorial efforts: "there is simply no edition of Boswell to which this last would seem preferable". Carlyle did not, however, share Macaulay's view of Boswell's character. Boswell, though "a foolish, inflated creature, swimming in an element of self-conceit"), had had, said Carlyle, the great good sense to admire and attach himself to Dr Johnson (an attachment which had little to offer materially) and the open loving heart which Carlyle thought indispensable for knowing and vividly uttering forth:

Boswell wrote a good Book because he had a heart and an eye to discern Wisdom, and an utterance to render it forth; because of his free insight, his lively talent, above all, of his Love and childlike Open-mindedness. His sneaking sycophancies, his greediness and forwardness, whatever was bestial and earthy in him, are so many blemishes in his Book, which still disturb us in its clearness; wholly hindrances, not helps. Towards Johnson, however, his feeling was not Sycophancy, which is the lowest, but Reverence, which is the highest of human feelings. That loose-flowing, careless-looking Work of his is as a picture by one of Nature's own Artists; the best possible resemblance of a Reality; like the very image thereof in a clear mirror. Which indeed it was: let but the mirror be clear, this is the great point; the picture must and will be genuine. How the babbling Bozzy, inspired only by love, and the recognition and vision which love can lend, epitomises nightly the words of Wisdom, the deeds and aspects of Wisdom, and so, by little and little, unconsciously works together for us a whole Johnsoniad; a more free, perfect, sunlit and spirit-speaking likeness than for many centuries had been drawn by man of man!

=== 20th-century reassessment ===
More recent critics have been mostly positive. Frederick Pottle calls the Life "the crowning achievement of an artist who for more than twenty five years had been deliberately disciplining himself for such a task." W. K. Wimsatt argues, "the correct response to Boswell is to value the man through the artist, the artist in the man". Leopold Damrosch claims that the work is of those that "do not lend themselves very easily to the usual categories by which the critic explains and justifies his admiration". Walter Jackson Bate emphasised the uniqueness of the work when he says "nothing comparable to it had existed. Nor has anything comparable been written since, because that special union of talents, opportunities, and subject matter has never been duplicated."

However, Leopold Damrosch sees problems with Boswell's Life if viewed as a conventional biography: "[T]he usual claim that it is the world's greatest biography seems to me seriously misleading. In the first place, it has real defects of organization and structure; in the second place (and more importantly) it leaves much to be desired as the comprehensive interpretation of a life." Similarly, although Donald Greene thought that Boswell's The Journal of a Tour to the Hebrides a "splendid performance", he felt that the Life was inadequate and Johnson's later years deserved a more accurate biography.

== Notable editions ==
The first edition of Boswell's work appeared on 16 May 1791, in two quarto volumes, with 1,750 copies printed. Once this was exhausted, a second edition in three octavo volumes was published in July 1793. This second edition was augmented by "many valuable additions", which were appended to the 1791 text; according to Boswell's own "Advertisement": "These have I ordered to be printed separately in quarto, for the accommodation of the purchasers of the first edition." The third edition, appearing in 1799 after Boswell's death, was the responsibility of Edmond Malone, who had been instrumental in the preparation of the previous editions. Malone inserted the additions in the text, adding some bracketed and credited notes by himself and other contributors, including Boswell's son James. This third edition has been regarded as definitive by many editors. Malone brought out further editions in 1804, 1807, and 1811.

In 1831, John Wilson Croker produced a new edition which was swiftly condemned in reviews by Thomas Macaulay and Thomas Carlyle. The weakness of Croker's notes, criticised by both reviewers, is acknowledged by George Birkbeck Hill: "His remarks and criticisms far too often deserve the contempt that Macaulay so liberally poured on them. Without being deeply versed in books, he was shallow in himself." More objectionably, Croker interpolated into his Boswell text from the contemporaneous rival biographies of Johnson. Carlyle reviews and denounces the editor's procedure as follows:

Four Books Mr. C. had by him, wherefrom to gather light for the fifth, which was Boswell's. What does he do but now, in the placidest manner,—slit the whole five into slips, and sew these together into a sextum quid, exactly at his own convenience; giving Boswell the credit of the whole! By what art-magic, our readers ask, has he united them? By the simplest of all: by Brackets. Never before was the full virtue of the Bracket made manifest. You begin a sentence under Boswell's guidance, thinking to be carried happily through it by the same: but no; in the middle, perhaps after your semicolon, and some consequent 'for,'—starts up one of these Bracket-ligatures, and stitches you in from half a page to twenty or thirty pages of a Hawkins, Tyers, Murphy, Piozzi; so that often one must make the old sad reflection, Where we are, we know; whither we are going, no man knoweth!

A new edition by George Birkbeck Hill was published in 1887 and returned to the standard of the third edition text. Hill's work in six volumes is copiously annotated, and became standard to such an extent that when in the 20th century, L. F. Powell was commissioned to revise it (1934–64), Hill's pagination was retained. The single-volume edition by R. W. Chapman (1953) also remains in print, published by Oxford University Press.

Everyman's Library was launched on 15 February 1906 with the publication of Boswell's Life of Samuel Johnson.

In 1917, Charles Grosvenor Osgood (1871–1964) published an abridged edition, which is available via Project Gutenberg.

== General and cited references and further reading ==
- Anderson, Robert, ed. Works of the British Poets. Vol. XI. London, 1795.
- Bate, Walter Jackson (1977), Samuel Johnson, New York: Harcourt Brace Jovanovich, ISBN 0-15-179260-7.
- Boswell, James (1986), Hibbert, Christopher (ed.), The Life of Samuel Johnson, New York: Penguin Classics, ISBN 0-14-043116-0.
- Brady, Frank. "Boswell's Self-Presentation and His Critics." SEL: Studies in English Literature 1500–1900, Vol. 12, No. 3 (Summer 1972), pp. 545–555.
- Burke, Edmund. Correspondence of Edmund Burke, Vol. VI, Alfred Cobban and R. A. Smith, eds. Chicago, 1958–1968.
- Carlyle, Thomas (1904). "Boswell's Life of Johnson". Critical and Miscellaneous Essays: Volume III. The Works of Thomas Carlyle in Thirty Volumes. Vol. XXVIII. New York: Charles Scribner's Sons. pp. 62–135.
- Damrosch, Leopold. "The Life of Johnson: An Anti-Theory". Eighteenth-Century Studies, Vol. 6, No. 4 (Summer 1973), pp. 486–505.
- Dowling, William. "Biographer, Hero, and Audience in Boswell's Life of Johnson." SEL: Studies in English Literature 1500–1900 Vol. 20, No. 3 (Summer 1980), pp. 475–491.
- Greene, Donald. "Do We Need a Biography of Johnson's "Boswell" Years?" Modern Language Studies, Vol. 9, No. 3 (Autumn 1979), pp. 128–136.
- Johnson, Samuel. Letters of Samuel Johnson Vol. II, ed. R. W. Chapman. Oxford: Clarendon Press, 1952.
- Lustig, Irma S. "Boswell's Literary Criticism in the Life of Johnson" SEL: Studies in English Literature 1500–1900 Vol. 6, No 3 (Summer 1966), pp. 529–541.
- Pottle, Frederick. The Literary Career of James Boswell, Esquire. Oxford, 1929.
- Sisman, Adam (2001), Boswell's Presumptuous Task: The Making of the Life of Dr. Johnson, New York: Farrar, Straus, and Giroux, ISBN 0-374-11561-3
- Tankard, Paul, ed. "The Lives of Johnson." Facts and Inventions: Selections from the Journalism of James Boswell. New Haven: Yale University Press, 2014. ISBN 978-0-300-14126-9.
- Wimsatt, W. K. "The Fact Imagined: James Boswell, in Hateful Contraries, ed. William K Wimsatt. Lexington, Kentucky: University of Kentucky Press, 1965.
