= Spectator =

Spectator or The Spectator may refer to:

- Spectator sport, a sport that is characterized by the presence of spectators, or watchers, at its matches
- Audience

== Publications ==
=== Canada ===
- The Hamilton Spectator, a Hamilton, Ontario, Canada, newspaper published since 1846

=== Colombia ===
- El Espectador, a daily newspaper

=== India ===
- The Spectator (Indian newspaper), an Indian newspaper

=== United Kingdom ===
- The Spectator, a British weekly current affairs magazine
- The Spectator (1711), a British publication between 1711 and 1712

=== United States ===
- The American Spectator, a conservative political magazine
- American Spectator (literary magazine), a literary magazine published from 1932 to 1937
- New-York Spectator, a New York City newspaper published as The Spectator from 1797 to 1804, New-York Spectator from 1804 to 1867, and New York Spectator and Weekly Commercial Advertiser from 1867 to 1876.
- Spectator Magazine, a BDSM/sex newspaper in San Francisco, California, published from 1978 until 2005
- The Washington Spectator, a liberal magazine, begun in 1971. A newspaper called the Spectator was published in Washington before the Civil War.

Student publications

- Columbia Daily Spectator, the student newspaper of Columbia University
- The Spectator (Stuyvesant High School), the student newspaper of Stuyvesant High School
- The Spectator, the student newspaper of Hamilton College
- The Spectator, the student newspaper of Valdosta State University
- The Spectator, the student newspaper of University of Wisconsin–Eau Claire

== Film and TV ==
- The Spectator (film), a 2004 Italian film starring Barbora Bobulova

== Other uses ==
- Spectators (album), an album of the German synthpop duo Wolfsheim
- Spectators, an album by Amelia Curran (musician)
- Spectatoring
- Spectator shoe, a shoe style constructed from two contrasting colors
