= Noah Webster =

American lexicographer and author (1758–1843)

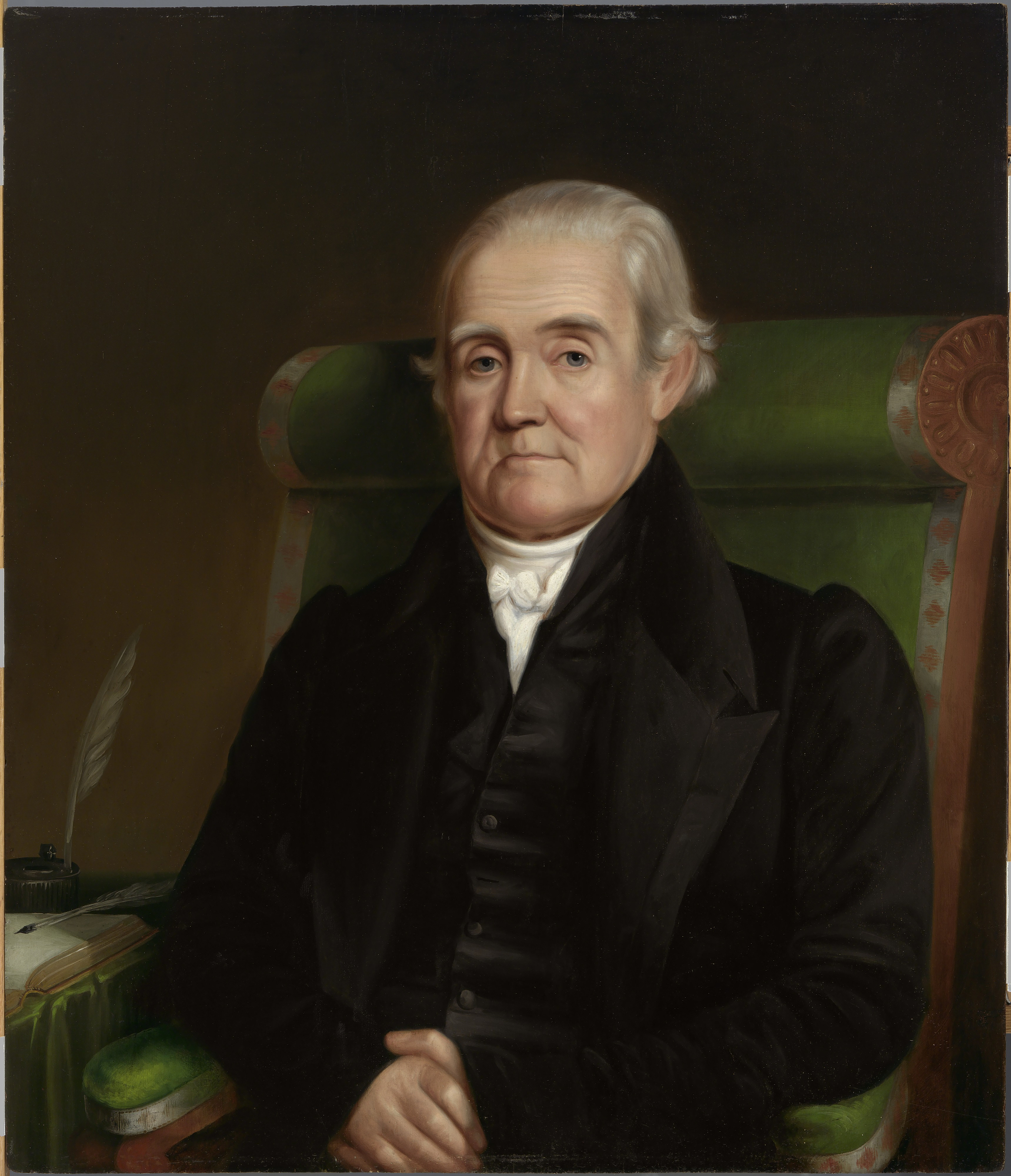
- Portrait by James Herring, 1833

Member of the Connecticut House of Representatives
- In office 1802–1807
- In office 1800

Personal details
- Born: Noah Webster Jr. October 16, 1758 Western Division of Hartford, Connecticut Colony, British America
- Died: May 28, 1843 (aged 84) New Haven, Connecticut, U.S.
- Resting place: Grove Street Cemetery
- Party: Federalist
- Spouse: Rebecca Greenleaf Webster (m. 1789)
- Children: 8
- Education: Yale College
- Occupation: Lexicographer; Author

Military service
- Allegiance: United States
- Branch/service: Connecticut Militia
- Battles/wars: American Revolutionary War

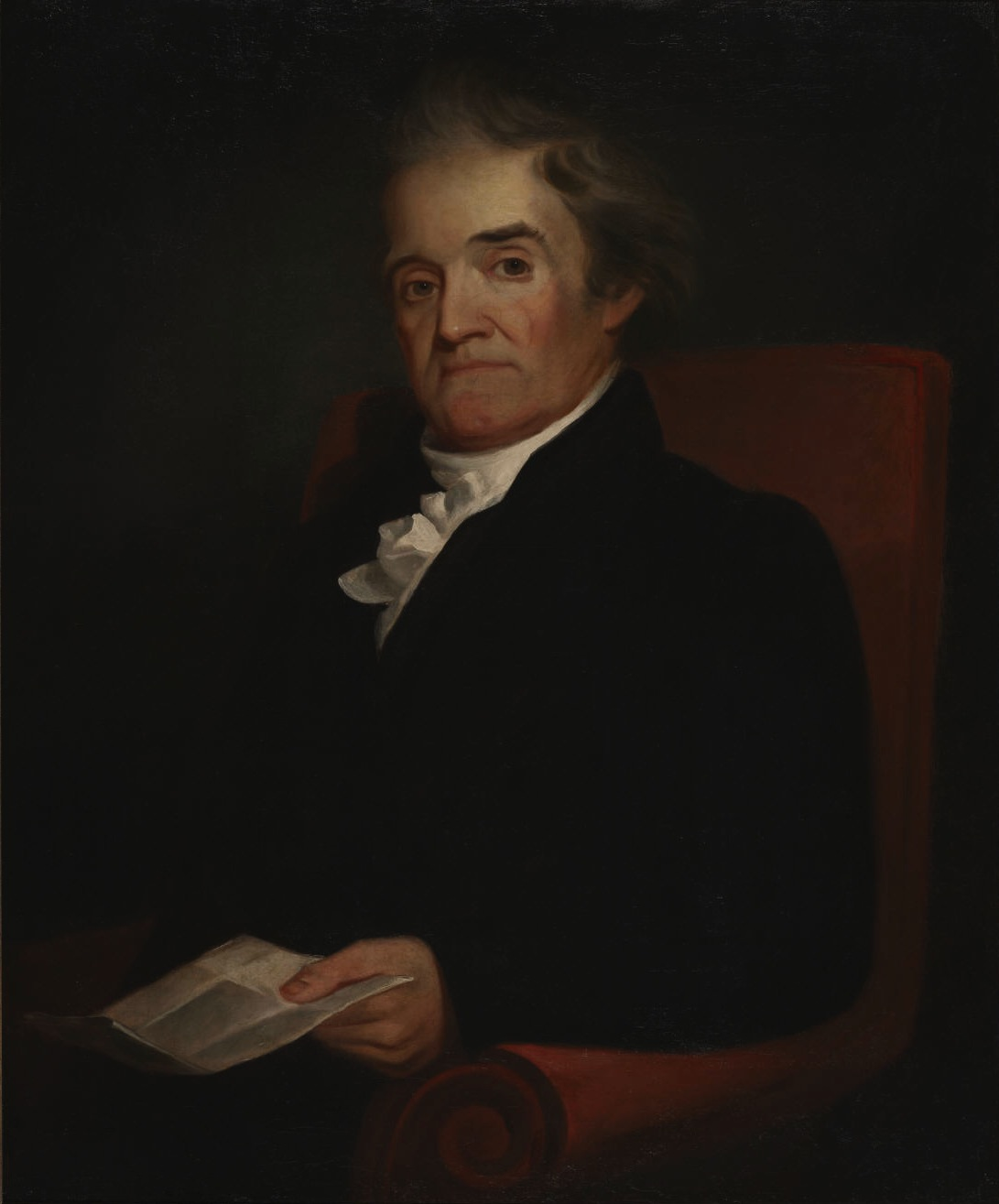
A portrait of Webster by Samuel Morse

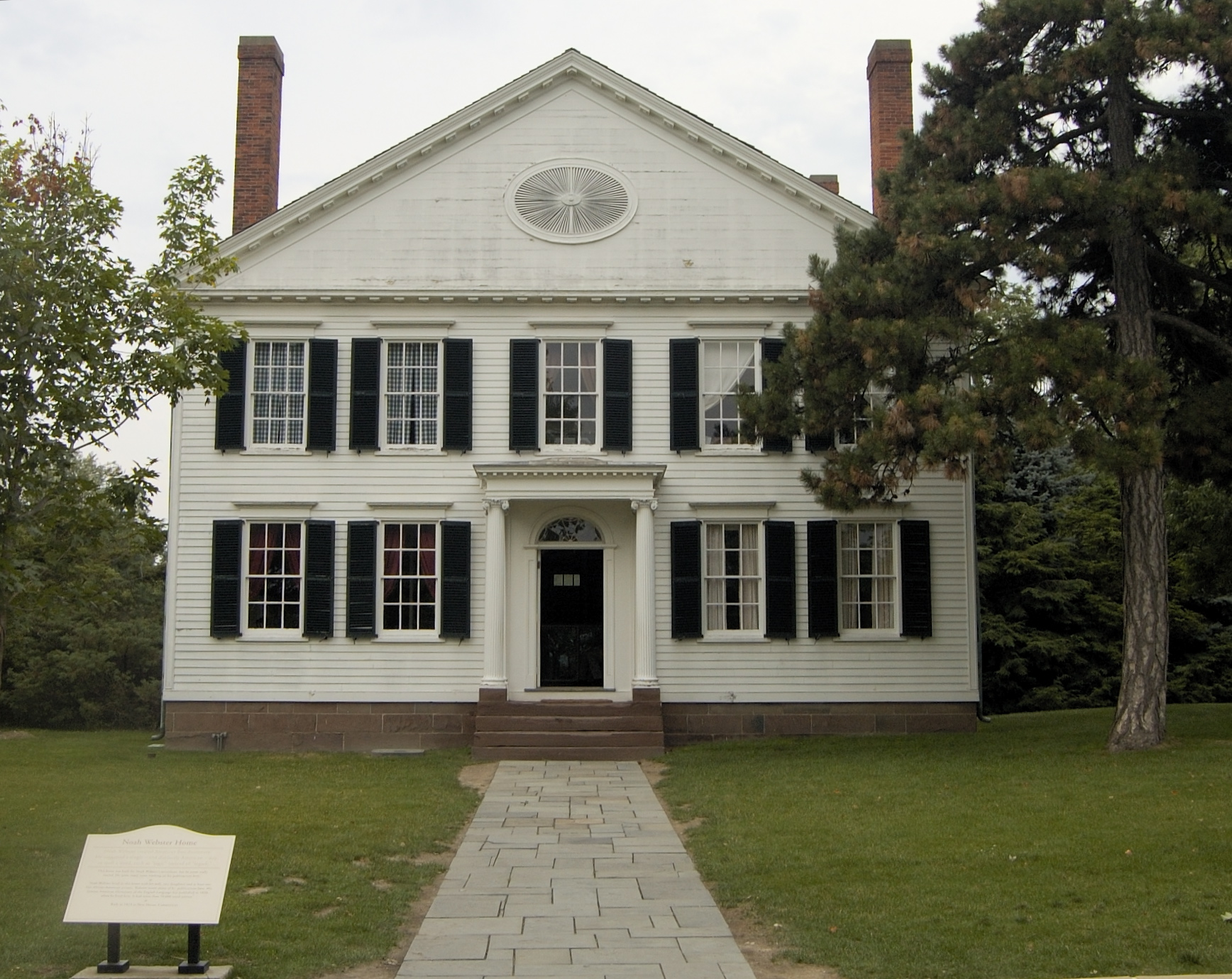
Webster's home in New Haven, Connecticut, where he wrote An American Dictionary of the English Language; the home was later relocated to Greenfield Village in Dearborn, Michigan.

Noah Webster (October 16, 1758 – May 28, 1843) was an American lexicographer, textbook pioneer, English-language spelling reformer, political writer, editor, and author. He has been called the "Father of American Scholarship and Education". He authored a large number of "Blue-Back Speller" books which were used to teach American children how to spell and read. He is also the author for the modern Merriam-Webster dictionary that was first published in 1828 as An American Dictionary of the English Language.

Born in West Hartford, Connecticut, Webster graduated from Yale College in 1778. He passed the bar examination after studying law under Oliver Ellsworth and others but was unable to find work as a lawyer. He found some financial success by opening a private school and writing a series of educational books, including the "Blue-Back Speller". A strong supporter of the American Revolution and the ratification of the United States Constitution, Webster later criticized American society as being in need of an intellectual foundation. He believed American nationalism had distinctive qualities that differed from European values.

In 1793, Alexander Hamilton recruited Webster to move to New York City and become an editor for a Federalist Party newspaper. He became a prolific author, publishing newspaper articles, political essays, and textbooks. He returned to Connecticut in 1798 and served in the Connecticut House of Representatives. Webster founded the Connecticut Society for the Abolition of Slavery in 1791, though he later expressed critical views of the abolitionist movement.

In 1806, Webster published his first dictionary, A Compendious Dictionary of the English Language. The following year, he started working on an expanded and comprehensive dictionary, finally publishing it in 1828. He was influential in popularizing certain American spellings. He played a role in advocating for copyright reform, contributing to the Copyright Act of 1831, the first major statutory revision of U.S. copyright law. While working on a second volume of his dictionary, Webster died in 1843, and the rights to the dictionary were acquired by George and Charles Merriam.

== Early life and education ==
Webster was born on October 16, 1758, in the Noah Webster House in western Hartford, Connecticut Colony, during the Colonial Era. The area of his birth later became West Hartford, Connecticut. He was born into an established family, and the Noah Webster House continues to highlight his life and serves as the headquarters of the West Hartford Historical Society. His father, Noah Webster Sr. (1722–1813), was a descendant of Connecticut Governor John Webster; his mother Mercy (Steele) Webster (1727–1794) was a descendant of Governor William Bradford of Plymouth Colony. His father was primarily a farmer, though he was also a deacon of the local Congregational church, captain of the town's militia, and a founder of a local book society, a precursor to the public library. After American independence, he was appointed a justice of the peace.

Webster's father never attended college, but placed a strong emphasis on education. Webster's mother spent long hours teaching her children spelling, mathematics, and music. At age six, Webster began attending a dilapidated one-room primary school built by West Hartford's Ecclesiastical Society. Years later, he described the teachers as the "dregs of humanity" and complained that the instruction was mainly in religion. Webster's experiences there motivated him to improve the educational experience of future generations.

At age fourteen, he received tutoring from his church pastor in Latin and Greek to prepare him for entering Yale College. Webster enrolled at Yale just before his 16th birthday, and during his senior year studied with Ezra Stiles, Yale's president. He was also a member of Brothers in Unity, a secret society at Yale. His four years at Yale overlapped the American Revolutionary War and, because of food shortages and the possibility of a British invasion, many classes were held in other towns. Webster served in the Connecticut Militia. His father mortgaged the farm to send Webster to Yale, but after graduating, Webster had little contact with his family.

== Career ==
Webster lacked clear career plans after graduating from Yale in 1779, later writing that a liberal arts education "disqualifies a man for business". He taught school briefly in Glastonbury, but due to harsh working conditions and low pay, he resigned to study law. While studying law under future U.S. Supreme Court Chief Justice Oliver Ellsworth, Webster also taught full-time in Hartford—a grueling experience that ultimately proved unsustainable. He quit his legal studies for a year and lapsed into a depression; he then found another practicing attorney to tutor him, and completed his studies, and passed the bar examination in 1781.

With the American Revolutionary War still ongoing, Webster was unable to find work as a lawyer. He received a master's degree from Yale by delivering an oral dissertation to the graduating class. Later that year, he opened a small private school in western Connecticut, which initially succeeded but was eventually closed, possibly due to a failed romance. Turning to literary work as a way to overcome his losses and channel his ambitions, he began writing a series of well-received articles for a prominent New England newspaper justifying and praising the American Revolution and arguing that the separation from Britain would be a permanent state of affairs. He then founded a private school catering to wealthy parents in Goshen, New York and, by 1785, he had written his speller, a grammar book and a reader for elementary schools. Proceeds from continuing sales of the popular blue-backed speller enabled Webster to spend many years working on his famous dictionary.

Webster was by nature a revolutionary, seeking American independence from the cultural thralldom to Europe. He aimed to create a utopian America, free from luxury and ostentation, and a champion of freedom. By 1781, Webster had an expansive view of the new nation. American nationalism was superior to European nationalism due to the perceived superiority of American values.

America sees the absurdities—she observes the kingdoms of Europe, disturbed by wrangling sectaries, or their commerce, population, and improvements of every kind cramped and retarded, because the human mind like the body is fettered 'and bound fast by the chords of policy and superstition': She laughs at their folly and shuns their errors: She founds her empire upon the idea of universal toleration: She admits all religions into her bosom; She secures the sacred rights of every individual; and (astonishing absurdity to Europeans!) she sees a thousand discordant opinions live in the strictest harmony ... it will finally raise her to a pitch of greatness and lustre, before which the glory of ancient Greece and Rome shall dwindle to a point, and the splendor of modern Empires fade into obscurity.

Webster dedicated his Speller and Dictionary to providing an intellectual foundation for American nationalism. From 1787 to 1789, Webster was an outspoken supporter of the new Constitution. In October 1787, he wrote a pamphlet entitled "An Examination into the Leading Principles of the Federal Constitution Proposed by the Late Convention Held at Philadelphia", published under the pen name "A Citizen of America". The pamphlet was influential, particularly outside New York State.

In political theory, Webster emphasized widespread property ownership, a key element of Federalism. He was also one of the few early American thinkers who applied the theories of the French theorist Jean-Jacques Rousseau in America. He relied heavily on Rousseau's Social Contract while writing Sketches of American Policy, one of the earliest, widely-published arguments for a strong central government in America. He also wrote two "fan fiction" sequels to Rousseau's Emile, or On Education (1762) and included them in his Reader for schoolchildren. Webster's Reader also contains an idealized word portrait of Sophie, the girl in Rousseau's Emile, and Webster used Rousseau's theories in Emile to argue for the civic necessity of broad-based female education.

== Federalist editor ==
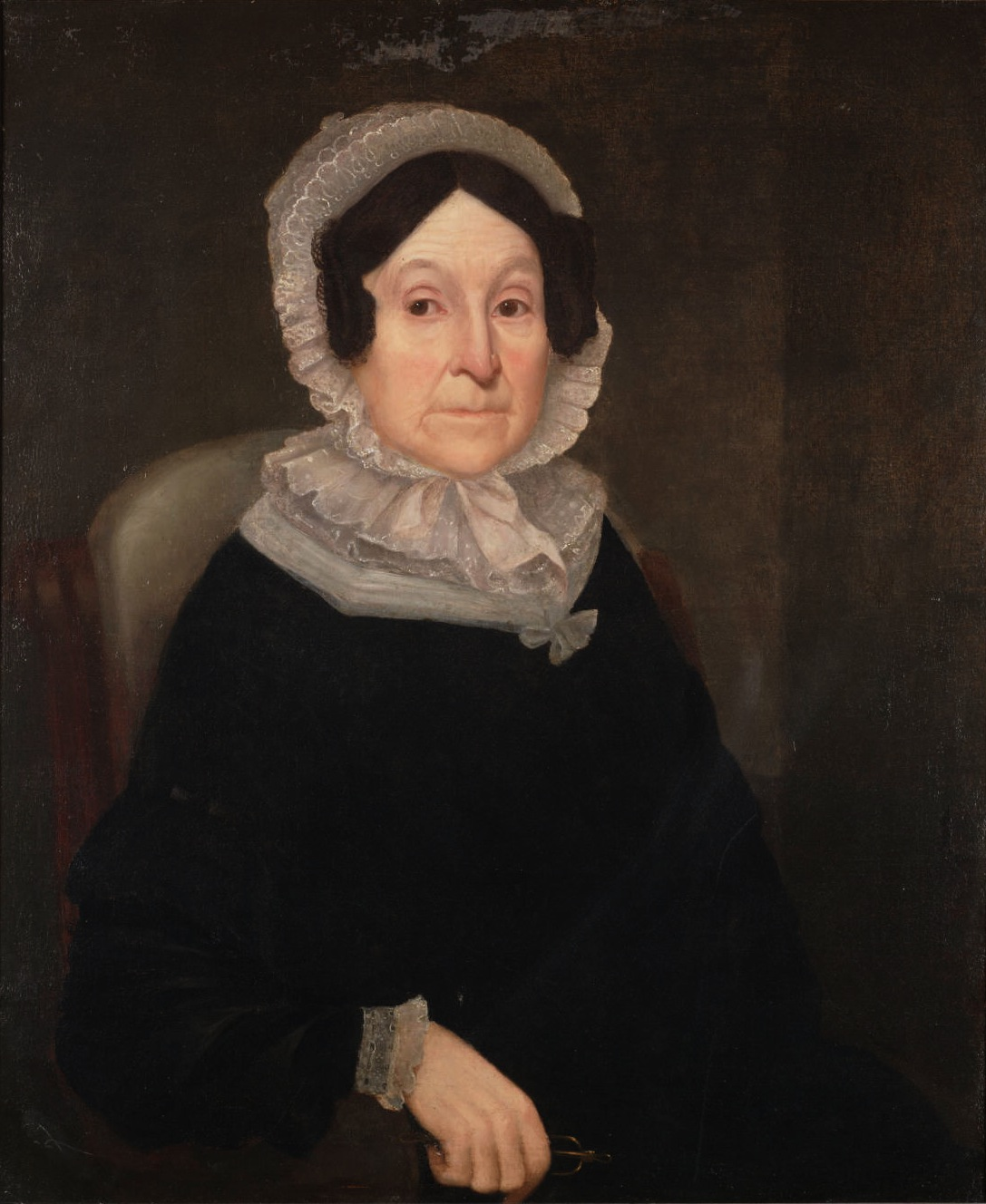
Webster's wife, Rebecca Greenleaf Webster

Noah Webster married Rebecca Greenleaf (1766–1847) on October 26, 1789, in New Haven, Connecticut. They had eight children:

- Emily Schotten (1790–1861), who married William W. Ellsworth and was named by Webster as an executor of his will. Emily, their daughter, later married Rev. Abner Jackson, who became president of both Trinity College in Hartford and Hobart College in Geneva, New York.
- Frances Julianna (1793–1869), married Chauncey Allen Goodrich
- Harriet (1797–1844), who married William Chauncey Fowler
- Mary (1799–1819) m. Horatio Southgate (1781–1864), son of Dr. Robert and Mary King Southgate
- William Greenleaf (1801–1869)
- Eliza Steele (1803–1888) m. Rev. Henry Jones (1801–1878)
- Henry Bradford (1806–1807)
- Louisa Greenleaf (1808–1874)

Webster joined the elite in Hartford, Connecticut, but did not have substantial financial resources. In 1793, Alexander Hamilton lent him $1,500 (~$36,108 in 2025) to move to New York City to edit the leading Federalist Party newspaper. In December, he founded New York's first daily newspaper American Minerva, later renamed the Commercial Advertiser, which he edited for four years, writing the equivalent of 20 volumes of articles and editorials. Webster wrote the first known newspaper editorial in the first edition of the American Minerva. He also published the semi-weekly publication The Herald, A Gazette for the country, later known as the New-York Spectator.

As a Federalist spokesman, Webster defended the administrations of George Washington and John Adams, especially their policy of neutrality between Britain and France, and he especially criticized the excesses of the French Revolution and its Reign of Terror. When French ambassador Citizen Genêt set up a network of pro-Jacobin "Democratic-Republican Societies" that entered American politics and attacked President Washington, he condemned them. He later defended Jay's Treaty between the United States and Britain. As a result, he was repeatedly denounced by the Jeffersonian Republicans as "a pusillanimous, half-begotten, self-dubbed patriot", "an incurable lunatic", and "a deceitful newsmonger ... Pedagogue and Quack."

For decades, he was one of the most prolific authors in the new nation, publishing textbooks, political essays, a report on infectious diseases, and newspaper articles for his Federalist party.

In 1799 Webster wrote two massive volumes on the causes of "epidemics and pestilential diseases". Medical historians have considered him as "America's first epidemiologist". He was so prolific that a modern bibliography of his works spans 655 pages. He moved back to New Haven in 1798 and was elected as a Federalist to the Connecticut House of Representatives in 1800 and 1802–1807.

Webster was elected a fellow of the American Academy of Arts and Sciences in 1799. He moved to Amherst, Massachusetts in 1812, where he helped to found Amherst College. In 1822, his family moved back to New Haven, where Webster was awarded an honorary degree from Yale the following year. In 1827, Webster was elected to the American Philosophical Society.

== School books ==
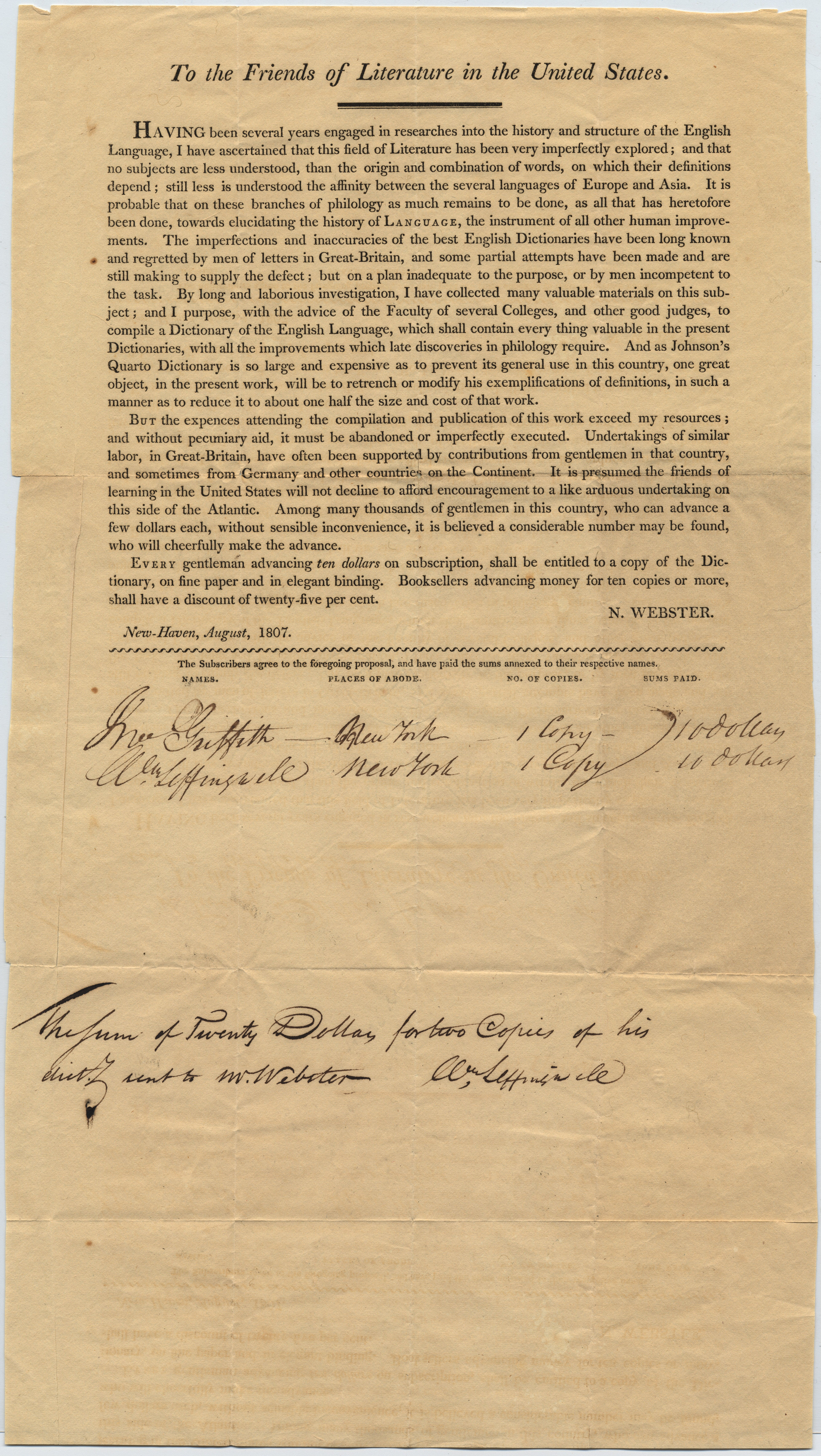
To the Friends of Literature in the United States, Webster's prospectus for his first dictionary of the English language, 1807–1808

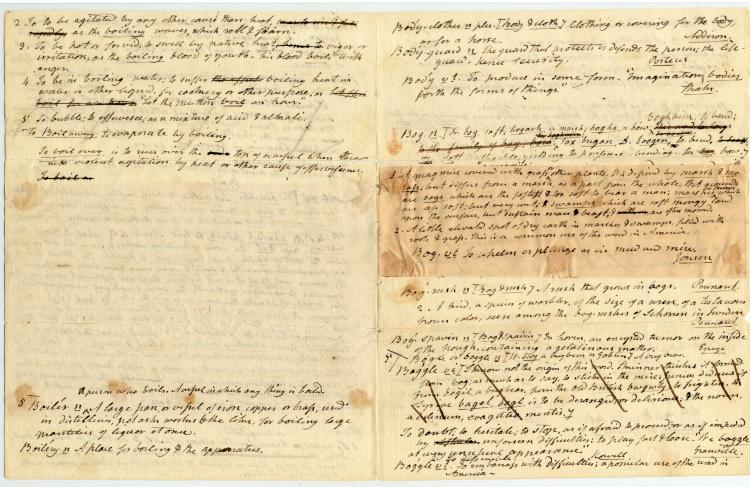
Handwritten drafts of dictionary entries by Webster

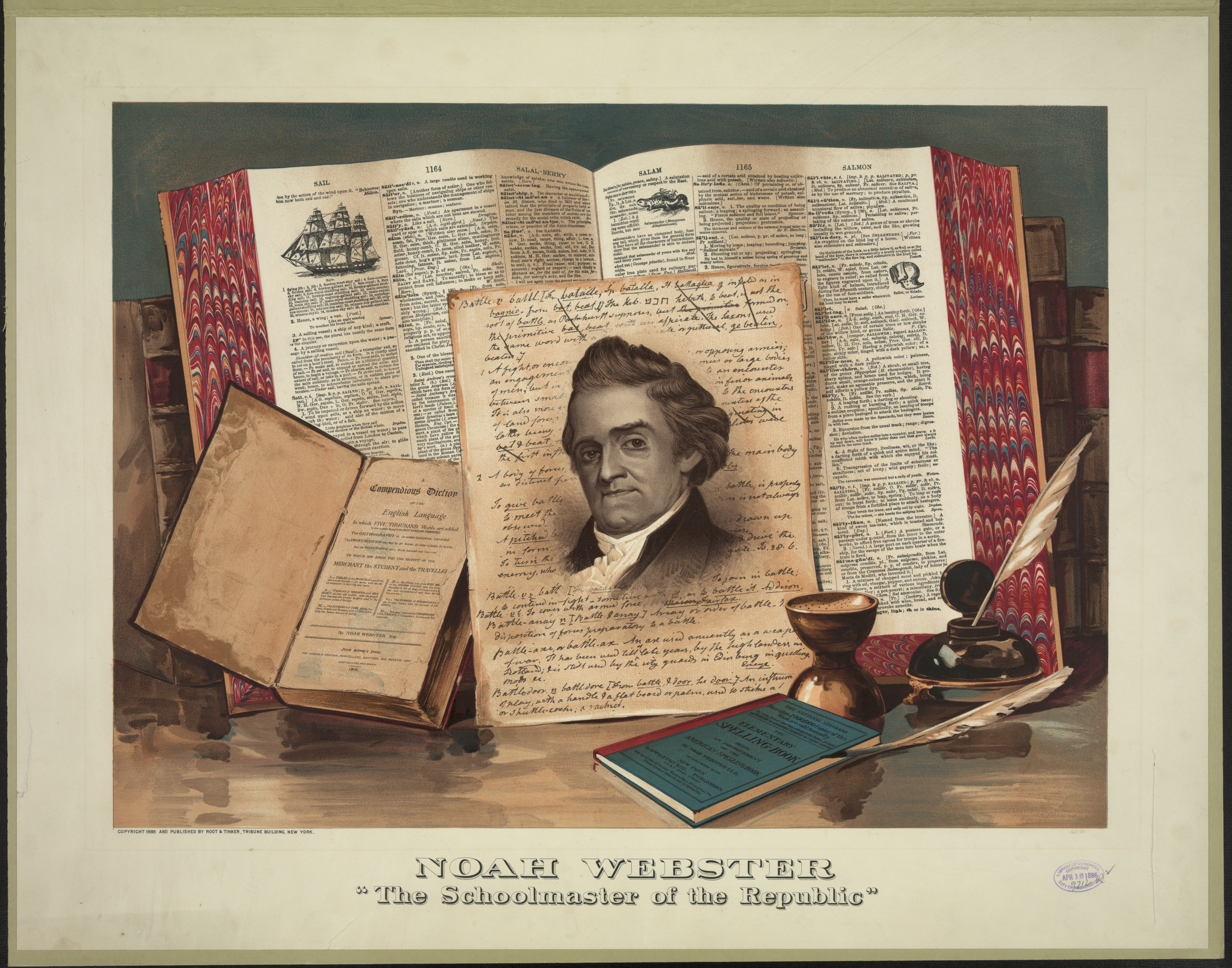
Noah Webster, The Schoolmaster of the Republic, published in 1886

As a teacher, Webster grew dissatisfied with American elementary schools. They could be overcrowded, with up to seventy children of all ages crammed into one-room schoolhouses. They suffered from poorly paid staff, lacked desks, and used unsatisfactory textbooks imported from England. Webster thought that Americans should learn from American books, so he began writing the three-volume compendium A Grammatical Institute of the English Language. The work consisted of a speller (published in 1783), a grammar (published in 1784), and a reader (published in 1785). His aim was to provide a uniquely American approach to education. His most important improvement, he claimed, was to rescue "our native tongue" from "the clamour of pedantry" that surrounded English grammar and pronunciation. He complained that the English language had been corrupted by the British aristocracy, which set its own standard for proper spelling and pronunciation. Webster rejected the notion that the study of Greek and Latin must precede the study of English grammar. The appropriate standard for the American language, argued Webster, was "the same republican principles as American civil and ecclesiastical constitutions." This meant that the people at large must control the language; popular sovereignty in government must be accompanied by popular usage of language.

The Speller was designed to be easily taught to students, progressing according to age. From his own experiences as a teacher, Webster thought that the Speller should be simple and give an orderly presentation of words and the rules of spelling and pronunciation. He believed that students learned most readily when he broke a complex problem into its component parts and had each pupil master one part before moving to the next.

Ellis argues that Webster anticipated some of the insights currently associated with Jean Piaget's theory of cognitive development. Webster said that children pass through distinctive learning phases in which they master increasingly complex or abstract tasks. Therefore, teachers must not try to teach a three-year-old how to read; they could not do it until age five. He organized his speller accordingly, beginning with the alphabet and moving systematically through the different sounds of vowels and consonants, then syllables, then simple words, then more complex words, then sentences.

The speller was originally titled The First Part of the Grammatical Institute of the English Language. Over the course of 385 editions in his lifetime, the title was changed in 1786 to The American Spelling Book, and again in 1829 to The Elementary Spelling Book. Most people called it the "Blue-Backed Speller" because of its blue cover and, for the next one hundred years, Webster's book taught children how to read, spell, and pronounce words. It was the most popular American book of its time; by 1837, it had sold 15 million copies, and some 60 million by 1890—reaching the majority of young students in the nation's first century. Its royalty of a half-cent per copy was enough to sustain Webster in his other endeavors. It also helped create the popular contests known as spelling bees.

As time went on, Webster changed the spellings in the book to more phonetic ones. Most of them already existed as alternative spellings. He chose spellings such as defense, color, and traveler, and changed the re to er in words such as center. He also changed tongue to the older spelling tung, but this did not catch on.

Part three of his Grammatical Institute (1785) was a reader designed to uplift the mind and "diffuse the principles of virtue and patriotism."

"In the choice of pieces", he explained, "I have not been inattentive to the political interests of America. Several of those masterly addresses of Congress, written at the commencement of the late Revolution, contain such noble, just, and independent sentiments of liberty and patriotism, that I cannot help wishing to transfuse them into the breasts of the rising generation."

Students received the usual quota of Plutarch, Shakespeare, Swift, and Joseph Addison, as well as such Americans as Joel Barlow's Vision of Columbus, Timothy Dwight's Conquest of Canaan, and John Trumbull's poem M'Fingal. The Reader included two, original, fan-fiction sequels to Emile or On Education by Jean-Jacques Rousseau, a portrait of Rousseau's character, Sophie, and a tribute to Juliana Smith who had recently rejected Webster's romantic advances. Webster also included excerpts from Tom Paine's The Crisis and an essay by Thomas Day calling for the abolition of slavery in accord with the Declaration of Independence.

Webster's Speller was relatively secular. It ended with two pages of important dates in American history, beginning with Columbus's discovery of America in 1492 and ending with the battle of Yorktown in 1781. "Let sacred things be appropriated for sacred purposes," Webster wrote. As Ellis explains, "Webster began to construct a secular catechism to the nation-state. Here was the first appearance of 'civics' in American schoolbooks. In this sense, Webster's speller became what was to be the secular successor to The New England Primer with its explicitly biblical injunctions."

Later in life, Webster became more religious and incorporated religious themes into his work. However, after 1840, Webster's books lost market share to the McGuffey Eclectic Readers of William Holmes McGuffey, which sold over 120 million copies.

Vincent P. Bynack (1984) examines Webster in relation to his commitment to the idea of a unified American national culture that would stave off the decline of republican virtues and solidarity. Webster acquired his perspective on language from such theorists as Maupertuis, Michaelis, and Herder. There he found the belief that a nation's linguistic forms and the thoughts correlated with them shaped individuals' behavior. Thus, the etymological clarification and reform of American English promised to improve citizens' manners and thereby preserve republican purity and social stability. This presupposition animated Webster's Speller and Grammar.

== Dictionary ==
=== Publication ===
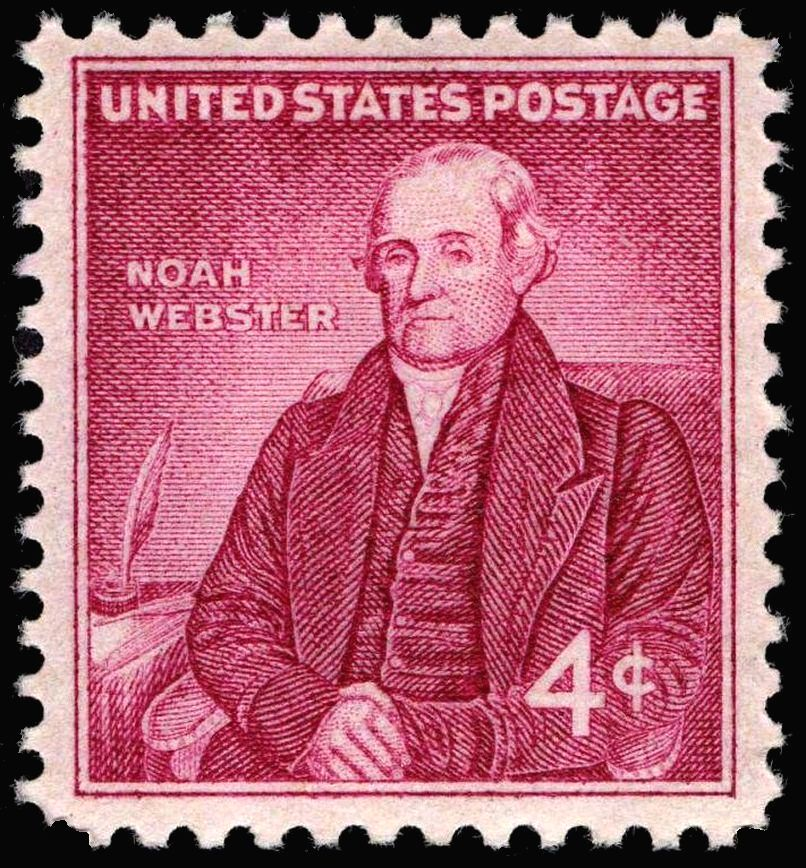
Webster honored on a U.S. postage stamp issued in 1958

In 1806, Webster published his first dictionary, A Compendious Dictionary of the English Language. By 1807, he began work on a more extensive dictionary, An American Dictionary of the English Language, which took twenty-six years to complete. His goal was to standardize American English, which varied widely across the country. They also spelled, pronounced, and used English words differently. However, his level of understanding for these languages was challenged with Charlton Laird claiming that Webster struggled with "elements of Anglo-Saxon grammar" and that he did "not recognize common words". Thomas Pyles also went on to write that Webster showed "an ignorance of German which would disgrace a freshman".

Webster completed his dictionary during his year abroad in January 1825 in a boarding house in Cambridge, England. His book contained seventy thousand words, of which twelve thousand had never appeared in a published dictionary before. As a spelling reformer, Webster preferred spellings that matched pronunciation better. In A Companion to the American Revolution (2008), John Algeo notes: "It is often assumed that characteristically American spellings were invented by Noah Webster. He was very influential in popularizing certain spellings in America, but he did not originate them. Rather ... he chose already existing options such as center, color and check on such grounds as simplicity, analogy or etymology." He also added American words, like "skunk", that did not appear in British dictionaries. At the age of seventy, Webster published his dictionary in 1828, registering the copyright on April 14.

Despite its significant place in the history of American English, Webster's first dictionary sold only 2,500 copies. He was forced to mortgage his home to develop a second edition, and for the rest of his life, he had debt problems.

In 1840, the second edition was published in two volumes. On May 28, 1843, a few days after he had completed making more specific definitions to the second edition, and with much of his efforts with the dictionary still unrecognized, Noah Webster died at the age of 84. The rights to his dictionary were acquired by Charles and George Merriam in 1843 from Webster's estate and all contemporary Merriam-Webster dictionaries trace their lineage to that of Webster, although many others have adopted his name, attempting to share in the popularity. He is buried in New Haven's Grove Street Cemetery.

=== Influence ===
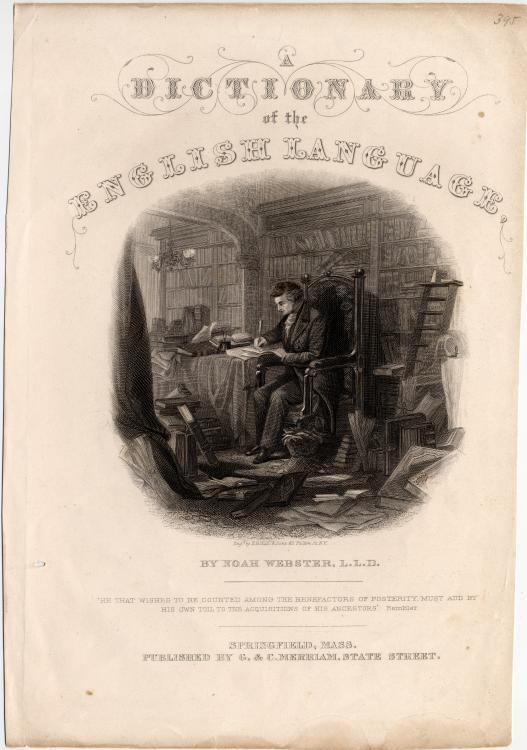
Title page of Webster's Dictionary of the English Language, c. 1830–1840

Lepore (2008) illustrates Webster's paradoxical views on language and politics and explains why his work was initially poorly received. Culturally conservative Federalists denounced the work as radical—too inclusive in its lexicon and even bordering on vulgar. Meanwhile, Webster's old foes the Republicans attacked the man, labeling him mad for such an undertaking.

Scholars have long seen Webster's 1844 dictionary to be an important resource for reading poet Emily Dickinson's life and work; she once commented that the "Lexicon" was her "only companion" for years. One biographer said, "The dictionary was no mere reference book to her; she read it as a priest his breviary—over and over, page by page, with utter absorption."

Nathan Austin has explored the intersection of lexicographical and poetic practices in American literature, and attempts to map out a "lexical poetics" using Webster's definitions as his base. Poets mined his dictionaries, often drawing upon the lexicography in order to express word play. Austin explicates key definitions from both the Compendious (1806) and American (1828) dictionaries, and finds a range of themes such as the politics of "American" versus "British" English and issues of national identity and independent culture. Austin argues that Webster's dictionaries helped redefine Americanism in an era of highly flexible cultural identity. Webster himself saw the dictionaries as a nationalizing device to separate America from Britain, calling his project a "federal language", with competing forces towards regularity on the one hand and innovation on the other. Austin suggests that the contradictions of Webster's lexicography were part of a larger play between liberty and order within American intellectual discourse, with some pulled toward Europe and the past, and others pulled toward America and the new future.

In 1850 Blackie and Son in Glasgow published the first general dictionary of English that relied heavily upon pictorial illustrations integrated with the text. Its The Imperial Dictionary, English, Technological, and Scientific, Adapted to the Present State of Literature, Science, and Art; On the Basis of Webster's English Dictionary used Webster's for most of their text, adding some additional technical words that went with illustrations of machinery.

In a 2024 article on Webster's legacy and role in the American Revolution, journalist Kelly J. Byrne from Fox News stated that he was "a patriot armed with the pen", who "fought for American independence with words, not swords" by "defining the language of the new nation". Quoting Merriam-Webster's editor-in chief Peter Sokolowski and biographies by Harlow Giles Unger and Joshua Kendall, Byrne highlighted Webster's belief that "the new political America also needed a new cultural America", which led to his role in establishing the distinct identity of American English, which resonates with Webster's idea of "America as a concept and as a country distinct from everywhere else". As a testament to his cultural and linguistic role in the American Revolution, Byrne mentioned that Joshua Kendall named his biography of Noah Webster "The Forgotten Founding Father".

== Views ==
=== Religion ===
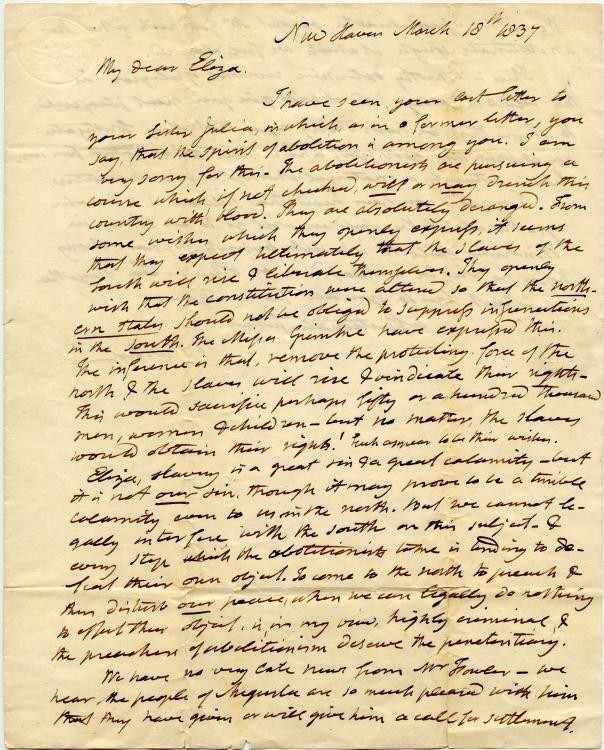
Letter from Webster to daughter Eliza, 1837, warning of perils of the abolitionist movement

In his early years, Webster was a freethinker, but in 1808 he became a convert to Calvinistic orthodoxy, and thereafter became a devout Congregationalist who preached the need to Christianize the nation. Webster viewed language as a means to control disruptive thoughts. His American Dictionary emphasized the virtues of social control over human passions and individualism, submission to authority, and fear of God; they were necessary for the maintenance of the American social order. As he grew older, Webster's attitudes changed from those of an optimistic revolutionary in the 1780s to those of a pessimistic critic of man and society by the 1820s.

His 1828 American Dictionary contained the greatest number of Biblical definitions given in any reference volume. Webster said of education,

Education is useless without the Bible. The Bible was America's basic text book in all fields. God's Word, contained in the Bible, has furnished all necessary rules to direct our conduct.

Webster released his own edition of the Bible in 1833, called the Common Version. He used the King James Version (KJV) as a base and consulted the Hebrew and Greek along with various other versions and commentaries. Webster molded the KJV to correct grammar, replaced words that were no longer used, and removed words and phrases that could be seen as offensive.

In 1834, he published Value of the Bible and Excellence of the Christian Religion, an apologetic book in defense of the Bible and Christianity itself.

=== Slavery ===
Initially supportive of the abolitionist movement, Webster helped found the Connecticut Society for the Abolition of Slavery in 1791. However, by the 1830s he began to disagree with the movement's arguments that Americans who did not actively oppose the institution of slavery were complicit in the system. In 1832, Webster wrote and published a history textbook titled History of the United States, which omitted any reference to the role of slavery in American history and included racist characterizations of African Americans. The textbook also "spoke of whiteness as the supreme race and declared Anglo Saxons as the only true Americans." In 1837, Webster criticized his daughter Eliza for her support for the abolitionist movement, writing that "slavery is a great sin and a general calamity—but it is not our sin, though it may prove to be a terrible calamity to us in the North. But we cannot legally interfere with the South on this subject. To come north to preach and thus disturb our peace, when we can legally do nothing to effect this object, is, in my view, highly criminal and the preachers of abolitionism deserve the penitentiary."

=== Copyright ===
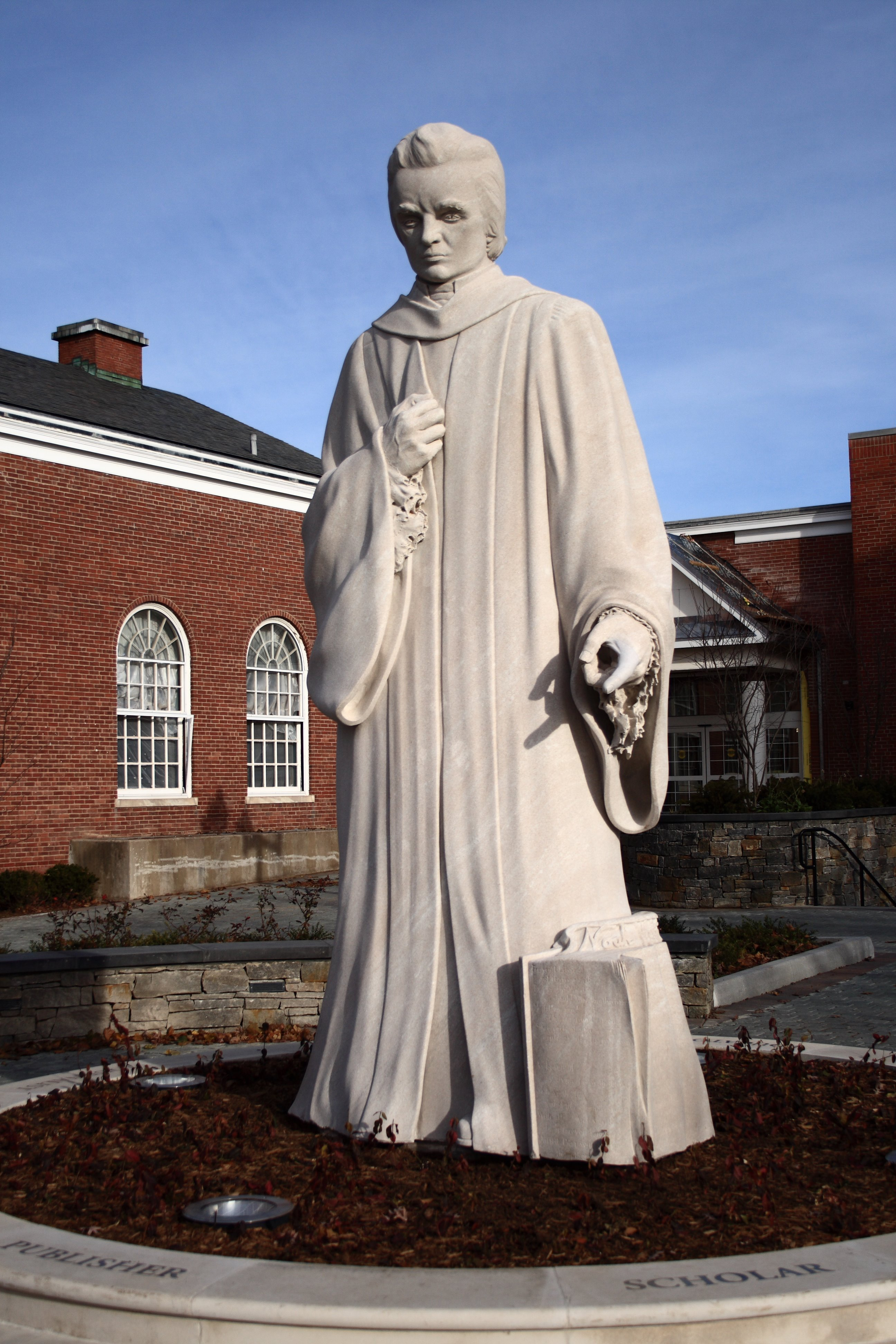
A 1932 statue of Webster by Korczak Ziółkowski at the West Hartford, Connecticut public library

Webster advocated for the expansion of copyright protections.

Webster played a critical role lobbying individual states throughout the country during the 1780s to pass the first American copyright laws, which were expected to have distinct nationalistic implications for the young nation.

The Copyright Act of 1831 was the first major statutory revision of U.S. copyright law, a result of intensive lobbying by Noah Webster and his agents in Congress.

Webster intended to publish A Grammatical Institute which may fairly be called the first book published in the United States of America. Each State was still a law to itself, and no general act of Congress had yet been passed conferring copyright. Webster's first business before he had actually completed his spelling-book was to secure copyright laws in the several States, and he began a series of journeys to Philadelphia and the state capitals for this purpose.

Webster rode to Philadelphia in 1782, however the legislatures of New Jersey and Philadelphia were not then in session. Later that year he went to Hartford where the legislature of Connecticut was in session. Again no success. But in 1783 Connecticut passed a different but similar copyright law. He then went in the winter of 1783 to New York with success, and in the same year Massachusetts enacted a copyright law.

Meanwhile, Congress, under the Confederation, had no power to protect literary property. By May, 1783 Congress passed a resolution recommending the states to secure to authors or publishers of new books the copyright of such books for a term not less than 14 years. And by December, 1783, New Jersey had passed a law agreeable to the recommendation of Congress.

Noah Webster was intent on having all of the states, separately or under federal law, provide for copyright of books and intellectual material. During May, 1785 he journey to the Middle and Southern States, without success. However, in November he visited General Washington at his mansion who gave him letters to Governor Harrison in Richmond, and to the speakers of both houses of the legislature. This resulted in passage of a copyright law. Webster visited Annapolis, MD and Dover, DE but nothing was accomplished.

Finally, in 1790 Congress enacted their first copyright law, which superseded all the state laws on the subject. Later, in 1825 while Webster was in England, he learned that the British Parliament had enacted a new law on copyrights, by which the rights of authors were much extended. He thus decided to get a new law in the United States giving a like extension. On September 30, 1826 he wrote Daniel Webster (no relation) for support. Daniel Webster responded October 14, 1826 that he would lay it before the committee of the judiciary next session. Noah Webster also wrote to the Hon. Mr. Ingersoll in 1827 also asking for his support to introduce a broader copyright law in the House of Representatives. Not unusual for Congress, delays, amendents, judiciary committee meetings, all delayed a result. By the winter of 1830–1831, Webster decided to personally visit Washington, D.C. He was able to address the House of Representatives and pushed it through. The Senate subsequently passed the legislation.

== Selected works ==
- Dissertation on the English Language (1789)
- Collection of Essays and Fugitive Writings on Moral, Historical, Political, and Literary Subjects (1790)
- The American Spelling Book (1783)
- The Elementary Spelling Book (1829)
- Value of The Bible and Excellence of the Christian Religion (1834)

=== Posthumous ===
- Rudiments of English Grammar (1899)

== See also ==
- First Party System
- Webster, Wisconsin, a town named for Noah Webster
