= Gendered sexuality =

Interrelationship between gender and sexuality

Gendered sexuality is the way in which gender and sexuality are often viewed as likened constructs, whereby the role of gender in an individual's life is informed by and impacts others' perceptions of their sexuality. For example, both the male and female genders are subject to assumptions of heterosexuality. If a man were to behave in feminine ways, his heterosexuality would be doubted, and individuals may assume that he is gay.

Two main theoretical perspectives dominate discussions of gendered sexuality: that of an evolutionary perspective, and that of a sociocultural perspective. Although these two are typically separate, Eagly & Wood believe that these two theories could potentially be reconcilable.

== Gender and sex in gendered sexuality ==
Both the terms gender and sex have been historically interchangeable, but it was not until the late 1960s and early 70s that the term gender began to be more thoroughly defined and spread throughout the literature within the field of psychology. Although the term has undergone some changes since then, today it represents how an individual feels and expresses their gender, typically through masculinity or femininity. Through this definition, gender has often been used as a variable to study how particular parts of people, (i.e. one's sexuality), can ultimately be informed by gender. Psychological research in this area has tended to follow these three modes of looking at gender:

1. Looking at gender through difference in presentation, actions, and traits
2. Looking at gender vs. individual difference in individuals who identify as male and individuals who identify as female, and
3. Looking at how gender influences how both men and women operate in society

Human sexuality, unlike gender, has kept a relatively stable definition by which it refers to all sexual attitudes and behaviours in an erotic, or lack of erotic, nature. The relationship between gender and sexuality is not static, it is fluid and changing. In light of this, gendered sexuality does not necessarily follow predictable patterns. Typically, however, gendered sexuality has often followed a heteronormative path, whereby heterosexuality is seen as what Vanwesenbeeck calls a "key-site" for the intersection between gender and sexuality. Historically, however, these interpretations of sexuality have been riddled with gendered stereotypes, such as men holding more permissive attitudes towards frequent sex and multiple sexual partners, whereas women are more conservative.

A study by McCabe, Tanner & Heiman illustrates that gender, at least in the Western world, informs how we understand and conceive of the construct of sexuality. Their study was aimed to discover how men and women gender their meanings of sex and sexuality, if at all, and their results suggest that men and women do talk about sex and sexuality in gendered terms. The most frequent categories of gendering sex/sexuality conversations were:

- Sex is only physical for men, and only emotional for women
- Sex is more important for men than women
- Women's physical appearance is important
- Sexual desire and/or pleasure does not significantly apply to women

The researchers also commented that these four areas of gendering sexuality occurred among the participants without any suggestions or hints towards these particular subject areas. The researchers conclusions stated that gender, in some way, dictates how we learn and what we know about sex and sexuality.

== Sexual orientation and gendered sexuality ==
Although gendered sexuality is often viewed through the constructs of male, female and heterosexuality, it can also be used in regard to other gender and sexual variant individuals such as gender dysphoria or those who identify as transgender, transsexual, intersex, homosexual or bisexual.

== Sociocultural perspective ==
The sociocultural perspective of gendered sexuality holds emphasis on the idea that men and women are social beings informed by the social group of which they are a part, and that the social and cultural aspects of these groups influence the traits prescribed to males and females. The sociocultural perspective deems these traits as performative, in opposition to an evolutionary perspective that describes them through notions of essentialism and innateness.

When looking at gendered sexuality through a sociocultural lens, behaviour that is considered appropriate will be influenced by four areas of social interactions: behaviour-related aspects, situation-related aspects, partner(s)-related aspects and subject-related aspects.

- Behaviour-related aspects

The sexual behaviour that is evaluated most positively will determine what sexual behaviours are most acceptable in relation to gender. These behaviours apply to specific groups, whereby positive evaluations drive what is socially acceptable and therefore, which behaviours drive overall behaviour. In regard to gendered sexuality, Vanwesenbeck suggests that gendered sexual behaviour, if positively accepted by a social group, is more likely to occur within that social group in comparison to if it was negatively evaluated. In regard to a Western context, this can be seen within heterosexuality in males and females. Gendered behavior is also influenced by family units and consumerism. For example, parents may shop for clothing for their son in the "boys" department. By marketing clothing in this way, the individual's interpretation of sexuality can be externally controlled at an early age.

- Situation-related aspects

This refers to how gendered behaviour is driven and/or encouraged by the sexual situation within one's direct social community. This sexual situation is referred to by Vanwesenbeeck (2009) as the sexual arena of the individual. Some examples of this could be: a gay bar, a sex club (See Ping pong show), or hip-hop culture. These experiences are all situation-specific in relation to gender and sexuality, and have a different meaning of what is considered as "normal" depending on the situational construct. Another factor that contributes to situational gendered sexuality is culture and custom. For some nations, it is customary for men and women to behave in certain ways that are considered unacceptable elsewhere. Men holding hands in India is much more acceptable than in the West, and due to these cultural differences, the perception and reaction to sexuality amongst gender varies.

- Partner(s)-related aspects

Different sexual interactions will determine how much an individual is concerned with conforming to positive societal influences of gender. Studies suggest that increased interactions and strength of gender performativity enacted by one's partner(s) will more strongly influence one's own adherence to gender expectations. The adherence to these gender norms leaves room for unspoken expectations that may create controversy and tension. As an example, it is commonly expected for men to propose marriage to women—not the other way around. This societal expectation influences the behaviors of men and women seeking marital status.

- Subject-related aspects

This final postulate rests on the individual, or the subject, and how much a person strives to meet societal gender norms.

There are several theories under the label of sociocultural perspectives which have been theorized to influence gendered sexuality.

== Social role theory ==
Social Role Theory dictates that people are a product of societal social roles set in place via cultural traditions, whereby society instructs all individuals what roles are appropriate for which individuals under particular circumstances. Social role theory can dictate many different types of social roles, in particular, gender roles. These gender roles imply that men and women have their own particular roles assigned to them via their sex, and that these roles are typical and desirable of their particular sex.

Gender roles are both restrictive and opportunistic, whereby they dictate an individual's potential through their identification as male or female. In the Western context, this can be seen particularly through the historic gendered division of labour where men and women are fit into different professional roles dictated by their physical capabilities, typically via sex. Vanwesenbeeck suggests that: "... It's not the biological potential, or sex, per se that causes gender (role) differences to emerge, but the way society differentially treats these potentials" (p. 888). Conformity to these beliefs occurs when others both encourage and accept these behaviours, which in turn, internalizes these gender roles within the minds of men and women throughout a particular group. In a Western context, Eagly & Wood suggest that there are two particular guiding principles of gender role behaviour:

1. Male-typical gender roles are often given a higher status of power, which labels these types of gender roles as dominant, and all others as marginal (e.g. female-typical gender roles).
2. All individuals of a particular society will attempt to both obtain and perform the specific components which correspond with their accepted gender role (e.g. women will attempt to perform the roles dictated by female gender roles).

Again, in a Western context, these gender roles also carry over to dictate sexual actions and behaviours. For example, a male gender role suggests dominance and aggression, which also carries over into a male sexual role, whereby the male is expected to be sexually dominant and aggressive. These ideologies were inherent within both male and female gendered sexual roles of the 1950s and 60s, whereby a husband was expected to sexually dominate his wife. These roles, however, have changed; there is also strong evidence to suggest that they will continue to change over time. This being said, social role theory, then, seems to also suggests that any non-heterosexual identity does not properly align with these gendered sexual roles and is not as accepted. This is also known as heteronormativity, which can be defined as "...the normalising of heterosexual structures and relationships and the marginalisation of everything that doesn't conform" (p. 142).

Having to maintain an identity that conforms to these gendered sexual roles, however, has not necessarily suggested positive outcomes. Vanwesenbeeck suggests: "... restrictive gender norms, which undermine women's power, competence, and agency, help account for women's higher rates of depression, poorer standardized scores on a variety of psychological outcomes, and higher discontent with sex" (p. 888).

== Sexual double standard ==
The sexual double standard is suggested to be a product of social role theory, whereby gendered sex roles are a part of this sexual double standard. Historically, the sexual double standard has suggested that it is both acceptable and even encouraged for men to have sex outside of wedlock, but the same concept does not apply to women. Today, sex outside of wedlock is accepted for both men and women in the majority of the Western world, but for women, this idea is restricted to the spheres of love or engagement.

The sexual double standard extends itself further to undermine women, whereby gender roles dictate that all women should be sexual, but sexually humble. It influences female sexual roles in that it suggests that women can never be sexual without being sexually promiscuous. Vanwesenbeeck calls this the whore-madonna distinction. Naomi Wolf, in The Beauty Myth explains "Beauty today is what the female orgasm used to be: something given to women by men, if they submitted to their feminine role and were lucky."

=== Research ===
In regard to researching gendered sexuality, self-reporting data can often be confounded by social roles, whereby individuals' responses to questions about sexuality will be influenced by one's ability to want to conform to their appropriate social role. Sexuality, in particular, will inform an individual's responses because the area of sexuality is heavily monitored by what are considered normative social roles. Alexander & Fisher conducted a study to determine whether or not men and women's self-reported sexual behaviours and attitudes are influenced by expected gender roles. The self-reported sex differences were mostly found where there was the greatest risk of participants' answers being read by others, and were smallest in the condition where it was believed that participants would most likely tell the truth in order to save themselves from the embarrassment of detected false answers. The results of the study suggest that men and women are influenced by expected gender roles when it comes to sexual behaviours, particularly those considered less acceptable for women than for men, and that they could actually be more similar than previously thought in regard to these behaviours.

Kennair et al. (2023) found no signs on a sexual double standard except against men. Generally there was no signs of a double standard in short-term or long-term mating contexts, nor in choosing a friend. The only exception was that women's self-stimulation was more acceptable than men's. Women assessed much more negatively their suitors with a larger sexual history than similar suitors of their friends, whereas for men the effect was smaller, suggesting women being more hypocrite.

Maryanne L. Fisher et al. showed how women's intrasexual competition causes derogatory gossip, also on sexuality. They did not find a single case where a woman would have been derogated of lack of sexual experiences or partners. Instead, sexuality, gold-digging, mate poaching, substance use and mothering qualities were used as subjects.

== Social constructionism ==
Social constructionism suggests that what we know to be reality is constructed by social realities that are derived from the history of humankind. Inherent within it is the constructionist paradigm, which has four main points:

1. One's experiences with the world are ordered in such a way that we can make sense of them
2. Language provides us with a classification system by which we can understand the world around us
3. All individuals have what is known as a shared reality of life, whereby we understand how reality differs from dreams by how people, places and other things are organized. We all know and understand this is how people operate.
4. We understand that the most beneficial way of going about doing something becomes habituated into the human psyche and ultimately becomes a part of our societal institutions.

These ways that social lives are constructed influences both gender and sex. Gender is socially constructed by the ways in which one's various everyday interactions with people in a particular culture influenced the external presentation and construction of gender. The social construction of sexuality, on the other hand, is specifically dictated through societal ideologies that limit and restrict what is constructed as appropriate sexual functioning.

From this standpoint, sex differences are simply byproducts of men and women attempting to adhere to their prescribed gender construction given to them by their society. Additionally, adhering to these constructions are complicated by a society's technological and situational conditions particular to each culture.

It is also important to point out that gendered differences in regard to social construction are also said to be driven by relations of power, typically through patriarchal ideologies which privilege men over women. These power relations influence differences between the genders, which additionally influences variables of sexuality, such as sexual attitudes and behaviours. Similar to social role theory, these constructions are often influenced by physical traits.

=== Research ===
The social construction of gendered sexuality is said to be influenced by culture. Petersen & Hyde suggest that there should be a smaller gender difference in regard to attitudes on sexual behaviours in cultures that have smaller gender differences in regard to power (e.g. division of labour between the sexes). They examined their claim by using nationality as a control for gender differences in sexual attitudes and behaviours. Results supported their constructionist claims: the majority of gender differences in sexual behaviours were smaller in Europe, Australia and the USA than in countries with large gender inequalities in Asia, Africa, Latin America, and the Middle East. They concluded that these differences in behaviour can be attributed to the way in which the positions of men and women are constructed within society.

Baumeister completed a study that looked at female erotic plasticity, suggesting that women are more susceptible to influence by social and cultural factors in regard to sexuality than men are. His results showed that women had greater sexual variability, lower correlations between sexual attitudes and sexual behaviour for women, and greater influence of social factors on these measures as well. Although Baumeister used an evolutionary approach to explain his findings, Hyde & Durik suggest that a sociocultural approach related to social constructionism is more appropriate. Hyde & Durik pointed out that in Baumeister's Western sample:

∗ Men have many more levels of power over women than women have over men ∗ Groups of people who have less power often attempt to acculturate their behaviour to those that are more powerful ∗ Both gender roles and social constructions influence both men and women's behaviour, particularly in the area of sexuality whereby heterosexuality is expected for both men and women.

Although other studies have attempted to replicate Baumeister's findings, no successful replications have yet to be found.

== Objectification theory ==
The objectification theory focuses on how the body is treated in society, particularly how female bodies are treated like objects. First coined by Fredrickson & Roberts, they initially constructed objectification theory to show how sexual objectification effects women's psychological well-being (Hill & Fischer, 2008). Sexual objectification can be seen particularly through the media via sexual inspection or even sexual violence. This objectification can lead women to look at their bodies as objects to be 'toyed' with, rather than an entity which works to keep an individual alive and functioning optimally. Vanwesekbeeck suggests that this "...makes women take distance from their bodies, doubt their bodies' capacities, and results in a lack of experience in using the body effectively" (p. 890).

Experience of objectification can vary greatly from woman to woman, but has been suggested to considerably effect how a woman experiences her own sexuality. Vanwesekbeeck When women's bodies are more frequently subject to the male gaze, particularly in regard to sexualization, this can lead women to continually police their body image. This creates what Masters and Johnson called spectatoring, whereby women are continuously conscious of their outer body experience, and in doing so, are completely unaware of their inner body experience. Spectatoring is said to decrease women's overall sexual satisfaction.

== Mass media ==
The majority of sexual objectification comes from the media, be it TV shows, magazines, movies or music videos. Brown suggests that the media impacts the sexual behavior of individuals in three key ways.

The First Way- The media takes on the responsibility of keeping sexuality, sexual attitudes, and sexual behaviors at the forefront of the public eye. Take, for example, magazines such as Cosmopolitan or Glamour. The majority of these magazines will have images and headlines intertwined with themes of sexuality with what they should be doing to stay sexy in order to keep their partners sexually interested. These forms of media, in and of themselves, are enforcing compulsory heterosexuality, let alone gendered sexuality.

The Second Way- The media serves as an enforcer of gendered sexual norms. Examine, for example, the cultural importances placed on heteronormativity. As proposed by Gayle Rubin, "heteronormativity in mainstream society creates a "sex hierarchy" that graduates sex practices from morally "good sex" to "bad sex." This hierarchy places reproductive monogamous sex between committed heterosexuals as "good" and places any sexual acts and individuals who fall short of this standard lower until they fall into "bad sex.""

The Third Way- The media promotes and encourages the disregarding of the sexually responsible model. Tying back into the previous examples, the media plays upon the assumption that an individual desires acceptance from others. If they display enough promiscuity and sexuality on say the covers of magazines, then eventually people will see that as being the norm and will ignore their social and moral obligations to be responsible with their sexuality.

These forms of information from the media have also been suggested to educate the public about sexual roles and portrayals of women, and these influences have been said to have different effects depending on the subgroup. The audience of this form of media, and this type of 'sexual education' is also said to influence some more than others. For example, there is evidence to suggest that teenage girls are most susceptible to these forms of knowledge, impacting female adolescent sexuality. All in all, the structure and foundation of American culture allows for mass media to heavily impact the many different aspects of individualized and gendered sexuality.

== Health consequences ==
Sexual objectification is said to primarily impact the psychological health of women. It is said to negatively affect young women by instilling shame, doubt and anxiety within them through body spectatoring and policing. These effects are said to potentially lead to even more serious negative mental health complexities, such as depression and sexual dysfunction.

Gender inequalities can create health inequalities. For instance, women live longer than men but are considered to be sick five times as frequently as men. Men experience higher rates of fatal illnesses as well as being more frequently injured.

The construction of gendered sexuality also brings health consequences in the medical community, in regard to mental solidity and physical health effects. In 1984 genital surgery was created for purely aesthetic reasons, but it has only recently in 1998 that it was recognized on a wider scale. Two such medical surgeries are known as vaginoplasty and labiaplasty. The vaginoplasty is used to “tighten” the vagina to improves function, and the labiaplasty is done to "'enhance' vulval appearance." Throughout time, and through these surgeries, the vagina and female genital is something that is looked at as a problem that needs to be solved if it is not viewed by society as "perfect." These surgeries cause insecurities among women, objectifying them and creating a normalized view on their genitals. Women are seen to "suffer from comparable feelings of genital anxiety," and will undergo these surgeries, that are acclaimed to be expensive and dangerous, in order to concede to social norms and suppress their anxieties. The pursuit for the "optimal vagina" consequently damages the health of women in their attempt to form themselves to idealized sexual function and appearance.

== See also ==
- Gender studies
- Sex and gender distinction
- Heterosexism
