= Dissertation on the English Language =

Book written by American lexicographer Noah Webster

Dissertations on the English Language was a book written by American lexicographer Noah Webster in 1789. The book followed Webster's 1783 work Spelling Book and aimed to differentiate American English from British English. In the book, Webster commented that "our honor requires us to have a system of our own, in language as well as government. Great Britain ... should no longer be our standard; for the taste of her writers is already corrupted, and her language on the decline." This dissertation was dedicated to Benjamin Franklin.
