= Merriam-Webster =

American publisher and dictionary

Merriam-Webster, Incorporated
- Parent company: Encyclopædia Britannica, Inc.
- Founded: 1831; 195 years ago
- Founder: George Merriam, Charles Merriam
- Country of origin: United States
- Headquarters location: 47 Federal Street, Springfield, Massachusetts, U.S.
- Publication types: Reference books, online dictionaries
- Owners: Encyclopædia Britannica, Inc.
- Official website: merriam-webster.com

Merriam-Webster, Incorporated is an American company that publishes reference books and is mostly known for its dictionaries. It is the oldest dictionary publisher in the United States.

In 1831, George and Charles Merriam founded the company as G & C Merriam Co. in Springfield, Massachusetts. In 1843, after Noah Webster died, the company bought the rights to An American Dictionary of the English Language from Webster's estate. All Merriam-Webster dictionaries trace their lineage to this source.

In 1964, Encyclopædia Britannica, Inc., acquired Merriam-Webster, Inc., as a subsidiary. The company adopted its current name, Merriam-Webster, Incorporated, in 1982.

== History ==
=== 19th century ===
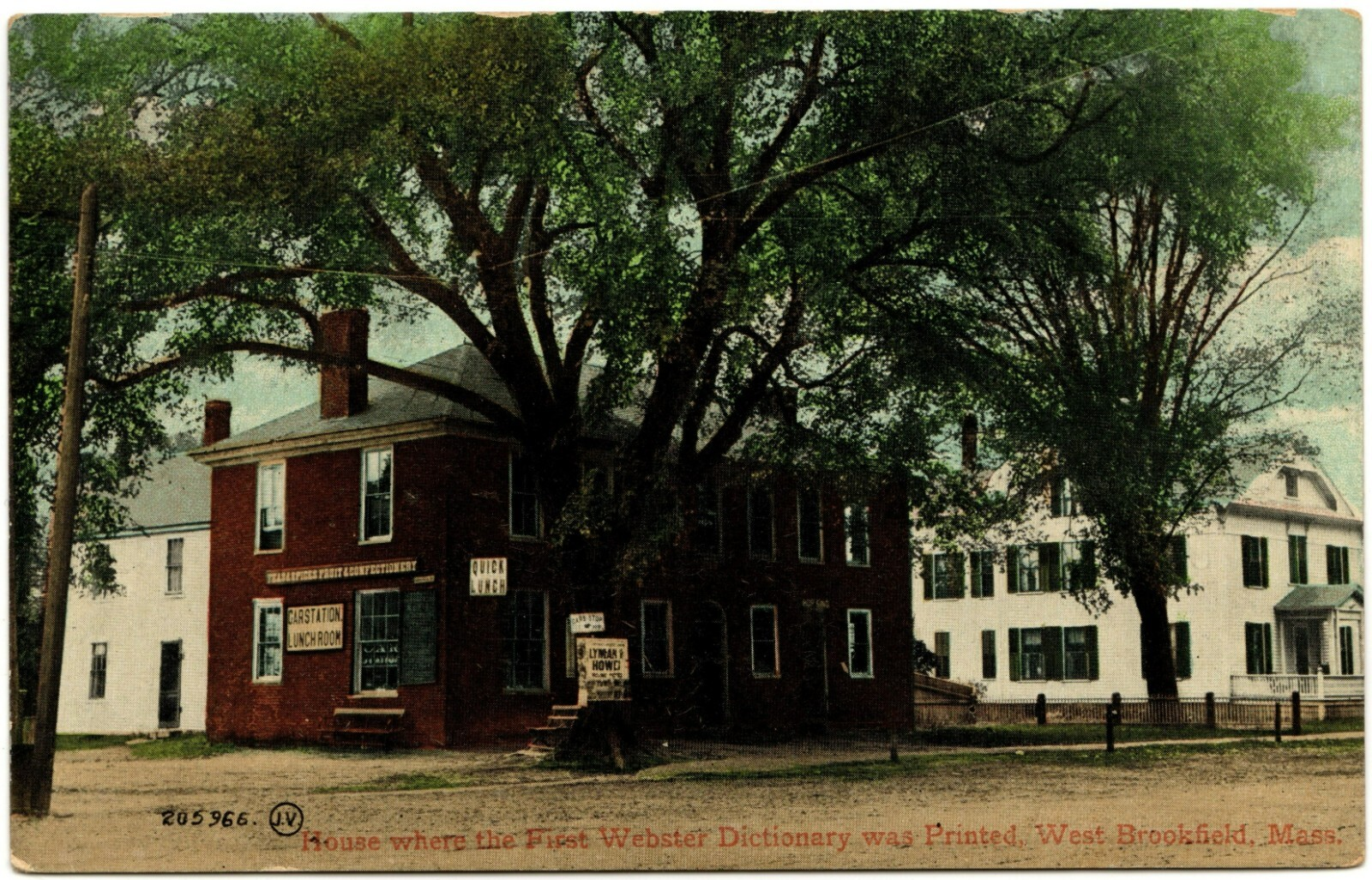
Circa-1910 postcard showing the Merriams' former print shop in West Brookfield. Contrary to the inscription, Webster's dictionary was never printed at this site.

In 1806, Webster published his first dictionary, A Compendious Dictionary of the English Language. The following year, in 1807, Webster began two consecutive decades of intensive work to expand his publication into a fully comprehensive dictionary, An American Dictionary of the English Language. To help trace the etymology of words, Webster learned 26 languages. Webster hoped to standardize American speech, since Americans in different parts of the United States used somewhat different vocabularies and spelled, pronounced, and used words differently.

In 1825, while spending a year abroad at the University of Cambridge and then in Paris, Webster completed this dictionary, which featured 70,000 words, about 12,000 of which had never before appeared in a dictionary. A spelling reformer, Webster believed that English spelling rules were unnecessarily complex and used the dictionary to introduce American English spellings, replacing colour with color, waggon with wagon, and centre with center. He also added American words, including skunk and squash, that did not appear in British dictionaries. Three years later, at age of 70 in 1828, Webster published the dictionary. But the dictionary proved a commercial disappointment, selling only 2,500 copies and leaving him in debt. In 1840, however, he released a second edition, which was published in two volumes and proved a vastly greater commercial success.

In 1843, following Webster's death, George Merriam and Charles Merriam secured publishing and revision rights to Webster's 1840 dictionary. Four years later, in 1847, they published a revised version of it, which did not change any of the main text but added new sections. In 1859, they published a second update with illustrations. In 1864, Merriam published a greatly expanded edition, which was the first version to change Webster's text, largely overhauling his work yet retaining many of his definitions and the title, An American Dictionary. In 1884, the edition contained 118,000 words, "3000 more than any other English dictionary".

In 1890, they published a dictionary, which they retitled Webster's International. The vocabulary was vastly expanded in Webster's New International editions published in 1909 and 1934, featuring over half a million words. Their 1934 edition was retrospectively called Webster's Second International, or simply "The Second Edition" of the New International.

In 1898, Collegiate Dictionary, now in its twelfth edition, was introduced. In 1890, following publication of Webster's International, two Collegiate editions were issued as abridgments of each of their Unabridged editions.

=== 20th century ===
Since the 1940s, the company has released several specialized dictionaries, language aides, and other references. In 1961, Merriam overhauled the dictionary again, publishing Webster's Third New International, edited by Philip B. Gove, whose revisions sparked public controversy. Many of the changes were in formatting, omitting needless punctuation, or avoiding complete sentences when a phrase was sufficient. Other more controversial revisions signaled a shift from linguistic prescriptivism and towards describing American English as it was used at that time.

In 1964, the company became a subsidiary of Encyclopædia Britannica, Inc.

In 1983, in the ninth edition of the Collegiate titled Webster's Ninth New Collegiate Dictionary (WNNCD), the Collegiate adopted changes which distinguish it as a separate entity rather than merely an abridgment of the Third New International, whose main text has remained virtually unrevised since 1961. Some proper names were returned to the word list, including names of Knights of the Round Table. The most notable change was the inclusion of the date of the first known citation of each word, to document its entry into English.

In 1983, after losing the right to exclusive use of the name Webster, its name was changed to Merriam-Webster, Incorporated, which was first reflected with publication of Webster's Ninth New Collegiate Dictionary. Previous publications had used "A Merriam-Webster Dictionary" as a subtitle.

=== 21st century ===
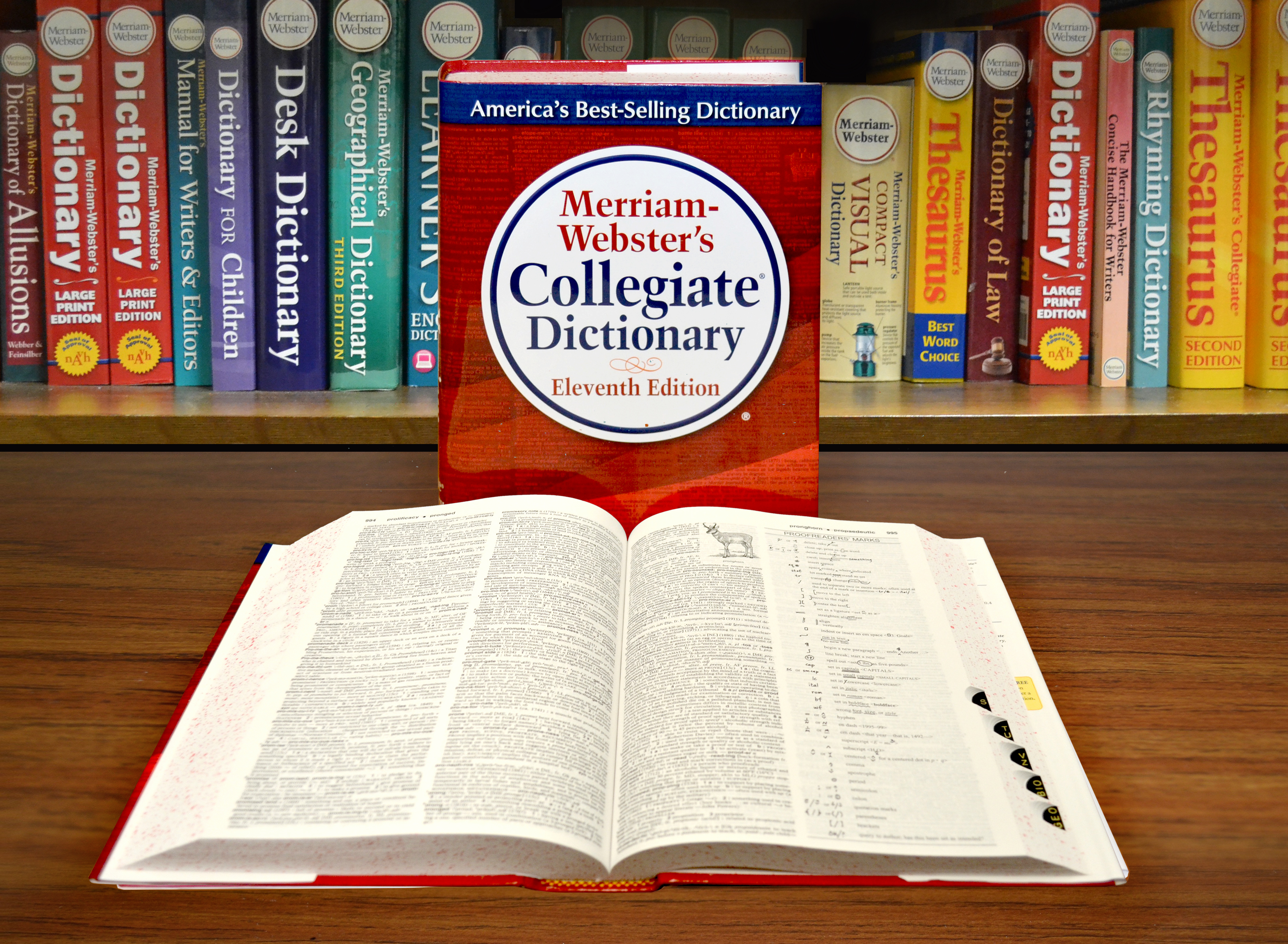
The 11th edition of Merriam-Webster's Collegiate Dictionary

In 2003, the eleventh edition of Collegiate was published, including over 225,000 definitions and more than 165,000 entries. A CD-ROM of the text is sometimes included. The twelfth edition was published on November 18, 2025.

The dictionary maintains an active social media presence, where it frequently posts dictionary-related content and its views on politics. Its Twitter account frequently used dictionary jargon to criticize and lampoon the Trump administration. In November 2021, for instance, Merriam Webster subtly accused Kyle Rittenhouse of fake crying at his trial in a tweet that went viral.

This dictionary is the preferred source "for general matters of spelling" by The Chicago Manual of Style, which is followed by many U.S.-based book publishers and magazines. The Chicago Manual states that it "normally opts" for the first spelling listed.

== Services ==
In 1996, Merriam-Webster launched its first website, which provided free access to an online dictionary and thesaurus.

Merriam-Webster has also published dictionaries of synonyms, English usage, geography in its Merriam-Webster's Geographical Dictionary, biography, proper names, medical terms, sports terms, slang, Spanish/English, and others. Non-dictionary publications include Collegiate Thesaurus, Secretarial Handbook, Manual for Writers and Editors, Collegiate Encyclopedia, Encyclopedia of Literature, and Encyclopedia of World Religions.

On February 16, 2007, Merriam-Webster announced the launch of a mobile dictionary and thesaurus service developed with Ask Me How, a mobile search and information provider. Consumers can use the service to access definitions, spelling, and synonyms via text message. Other services include Merriam-Webster's Word of the Day and Open Dictionary, a wiki service, which provides subscribers the opportunity to create and submit their own new words and definitions.

== Pronunciation guides ==
The Merriam-Webster company once used a unique set of phonetic symbols in their dictionaries—intended to help people from different parts of the United States learn how to pronounce words the same way as others who spoke with the same accent or dialect did. Unicode accommodated IPA symbols from Unicode version 1.1 published in 1993, but did not support the phonetic symbols specific to Merriam-Webster dictionaries until Unicode version 4.0 published in 2003. Hence, to enable computerized access to the pronunciation without having to rework all dictionaries to IPA notation, the online services of Merriam-Webster specify phonetics using a less-specific set of ASCII characters.

== Writing entries ==
Merriam creates entries by finding uses of a particular word in print and recording them in a database of citations. Editors at Merriam spend about an hour a day looking at print sources, from books and newspapers to less formal publications, like advertisements and product packaging, to study the uses of individual words and choose things that should be preserved in the citation file. Merriam-Webster's citation file contains more than 16 million entries documenting individual uses of words. Millions of these citations are recorded on 3-by-5 cards in their paper citation files. The earliest entries in the paper citation files date back to the late 19th century. Since 2009, all new entries are recorded in an electronic database.

== See also ==
- Lists of Merriam-Webster's Words of the Year
- Quordle, an online word game owned by the company launched in 2022
- Kory Stamper, lexicographer, editor, and social media personality at Merriam-Webster
- Webster's Dictionary
- Webster's Third New International Dictionary
- Word War 5, a word game collection co-distributed by the company launched in 1995
- Miriam Webster, Australian clergy member with similar name
