= George Merriam =

American publisher

- Born: January 20, 1803; Worcester, Massachusetts, U.S.
- Died: June 22, 1880 (aged 77); Springfield, Massachusetts, U.S.
- Spouse(s): Abigail Willis Little; Abigail Fiske
- Children: 7

George Merriam (/ˈmɛriəm/; January 20, 1803 – June 22, 1880) was an American publisher who founded G. and C. Merriam with his brother Charles. The brothers acquired the copyright to the works of Noah Webster. Merriam was the president of the company until his death.

== Early life ==
George Merriam was born in Worcester, Massachusetts, on January 19, 1803, to Dan Merriam and Thirza Clapp. Dan and his brother Ebenezer established a printing and bookselling business in West Brookfield, Massachusetts, in 1797, and used a printing press that was previously owned by Benjamin Franklin. Merriam apprenticed at his family's printing office and ended his formal education at 12. He moved to Springfield, Massachusetts, in 1831.

== Career ==
Merriam and his brother Charles started the publishing business G. and C. Merriam in Springfield. The works and copyright of Noah Webster were acquired by the Merriam brothers in 1847.

Chauncey A. Goodrich was selected to edit Webster's Dictionary and was editor until he requested a replacement in January 1860 due to his failing health. The Merriam brothers selected Noah Porter to replace Goodrich in 1860. The American Civil War greatly reduced business as their sales fell from over 1 million in 1859 to around 300,000 in 1862.

Merriam served as president of G. and C. Merriam until his death and was succeeded by his younger brother Homer, who held the position until 1904.

== Personal life ==
Merriam fathered seven children with Abigail Willis Little, whom he married in May 1828, and Abigail Fiske, whom he married in March 1842. Little died in 1841 and Fiske died in 1875. He died in Springfield, in 1880.

== Works cited ==
=== Books ===
- Martin, Peter (2019). The Dictionary Wars: The American Fight over the English Language. Princeton University Press. ISBN 9780691188911.

=== Journals ===
- "Obituary". National Journal of Education. 12 (2). Sage Publishing: 33. 1880. doi:10.2307/44803019. JSTOR 44803019.

=== Web ===
- "George Merriam notebook, 1839". William L. Clements Library. Archived from the original on May 24, 2025.
