= Spectatoring =

Sexual behaviour

Spectatoring is a process suggested by Masters and Johnson (1970) that involves a person focusing on themself "from a third person perspective during sexual activity, rather than focusing on one's sensations and sexual partner, can increase performance fears and cause deleterious effects on sexual performance." In clinical psychosexual practice, spectatoring is recognised as a key maintaining factor in psychogenic erectile dysfunction, where self-monitoring during sexual activity suppresses the parasympathetic nervous system response required for erection. To help individuals with spectatoring, some therapeutic interventions focus on redirecting the focus of attention from oneself to one's partner, while others such as sensate focus, involve focusing on and enjoying one's own sensations of being pleasured.
