= New-York Spectator =

The New-York Spectator is an American newspaper published in New York City under several different names from 1797 to 1876.

== Chronology of names ==
- 1797: The Spectator
- 1804: New-York Spectator
- 1867: New York Spectator and Weekly Commercial Advertiser
- 2018: The New-York Spectator
