= List of people from Norwalk, Connecticut =

Norwalk, Connecticut, has been home to numerous notable people, residents and others, past and present.

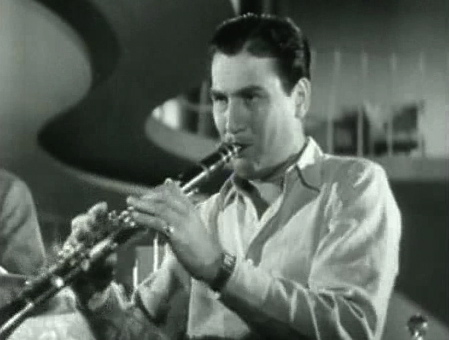
Artie Shaw, big band leader

== Authors, writers ==
- Faith Baldwin (1893–1978), novelist; worked with the Famous Writers School; lived in the Silvermine neighborhood and died in Norwalk
- Brian Basset (born 1957), Seattle-based cartoonist; born in the city
- A. Scott Berg (born 1949), award-winning biographer; born in Norwalk
- F. R. Buckley (1896–1976) lived in Norwalk
- Philip Caputo (1941–2026), author and journalist
- Tom Curry (1900–1976), pulp fiction writer
- Stanley Dance (1910–1999), jazz writer, biographer of Duke Ellington
- Peter De Vries (1910–1983), writer, editor, novelist, worked on The New Yorker magazine for many years
- Alyse Gregory (1884–1967), suffragist, journalist, and novelist; born in Norwalk
- Johnny Gruelle (1880–1938), artist and author; creator of Raggedy Ann; lived in town
- Bob Grumman (1941–2015), minimalist poet
- Emma Johnson (born 1976), podcast host and blogger
- Steven Kellogg (born 1941), author and illustrator of children's books; born in Norwalk
- Sheila Lukins (1942–2009), cook and food writer
- Warren E. Preece (1921–2007), editor of Encyclopædia Britannica's 15th edition
- Andy Rooney (1919–2011), commentator on 60 Minutes television newsmagazine on CBS
- Peter St. John, poet during the American Revolution
- Stephen W. Sears (born 1932), Civil War historian; lives in Norwalk
- Sloan Wilson (1920–2003), author; was born in the city
- Wayne Winsley (born 1963), broadcaster and author; former resident

== Actors, musicians, entertainers ==
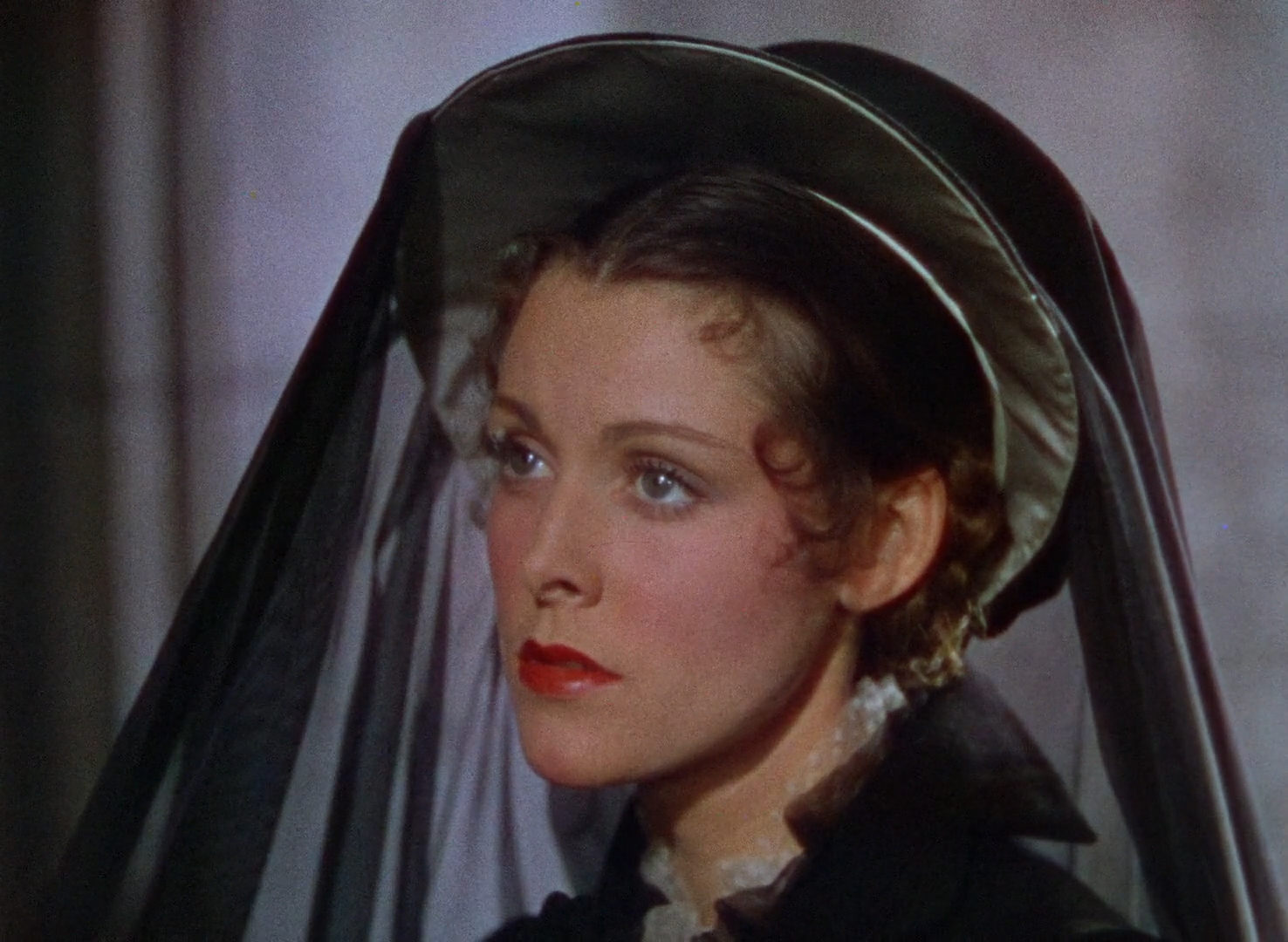
Frances Dee in Becky Sharp

- Roger Bart (born 1962), Broadway actor; born in Norwalk
- Jesse Bradford (born 1979), film actor; born in Norwalk
- D.J. Caruso (born 1965), movie and television director; born in the city and attended Norwalk High School
- Bud Cort (1948–2026), film actor known for playing "Harold" in Harold and Maude; died in Norwalk.
- Helen Curry (1896–1931), actress; died at her home in the city
- Ruth Chatterton (1892–1961), actress, writer and aviator; died in the city in 1961
- Charli D'Amelio (born 2004), dancer and social media personality
- Dixie D'Amelio (born 2001), social media personality and singer
- Robin de Jesús (born 1984), film and theater actor
- Frances Dee (1909–2004), actress; died in the city
- Mat Devine (born 1974), lead singer of Kill Hannah
- Violet Englefield (1881–1946), actress and singer; lived in Norwalk 1930–1939
- Ellen Hanley (1926–2007), musical theater performer
- Eileen Heckart (1919–2001), actress; died at her home in the city
- Clegg Hoyt (1910–1967), film and television actor; born in Norwalk
- Sarah Jacobson (1971–2004), independent filmmaker; born in Norwalk
- Ilias Kementzides (1926-2006), musician; lived in Norwalk
- Mitch Longley (born 1965), television actor; graduated from Brien McMahon High School
- Forrest McClendon, Tony Award-nominated actor (The Scottsboro Boys)
- Vince Mendoza (born 1961), music arranger and composer; born in Norwalk
- Artie Shaw (1910–2004), Big Band composer; lived in Norwalk in the 1950s
- Horace Silver (1928–2014), jazz pianist and composer; born in the city
- John Simon (born 1941), musician, record producer, and composer; born in Norwalk
- Joan Wasser (born 1970), violinist and singer-songwriter; was raised in the city
- Chris Webby (Christian Webster), rapper; grew up in Norwalk
- Bruce Weitz (born 1943), actor; was born in Norwalk
- Treat Williams (1951–2023), actor; Rowayton resident
- Remy Zaken (born 1989), stage and television actress

== Sports ==
- Érik Bédard (born 1979), pitcher for the Baltimore Orioles; went to Norwalk Community College
- Paul Gerken (born 1950), professional tennis player
- Luca Koleosho, soccer player for Burnley of the English Premier League was born in Norwalk and played as a child at nearby Trumbull United
- Mickey Kydes, soccer player for the NY/NJ MetroStars of Major League Soccer
- Randy LaJoie (born 1961), two-time champion driver in the NASCAR Busch Series (now the (Xfinity Series)
- Bob Miller (1929–2006), NFL Detroit Lions football player (1952–1958); born in the city
- Marie Corridon Mortell (1930–2010), won a gold medal in the 4 × 100 m relay in swimming at the 1948 Summer Olympics in London
- Kevin Morton, former pitcher for the Boston Red Sox
- Calvin Murphy (born 1948), former NBA basketball player; grew up in town
- Idris Price (born 1976), football player for the Tampa Bay Buccaneers
- Rita Williams (born 1976), WNBA Basketball player (1998–2003) Washington Mystics
- Scott Sharp (born 1968), auto racer, Indy Racing League champion; currently an American Le Mans Series owner-driver in the GT class
- Leif Shiras (born 1959), former tennis player and tennis journalist
- Dan Sileo (born 1963), former football player for the Tampa Bay Buccaneers, lived in Norwalk
- Tarvis Simms (born 1971), middleweight boxer; Golden Gloves champion; South Norwalk native
- Travis Simms (born 1971), welterweight champion of the World Boxing Association (as of January 2007); South Norwalk native
- Mo Vaughn (born 1967), former baseball player
- Mark Vientos (born 1999), MLB player for the New York Mets
- Luke Vercollone (born 1982), professional soccer player with the Charleston Battery; grew up in Norwalk
- Daniel Walsh (born 1979), rower and winner of a bronze medal in rowing at the 2008 Summer Olympics

== Government and politics ==
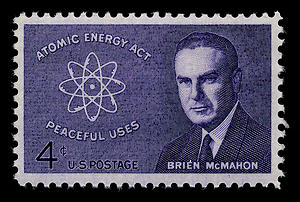
Brien McMahon stamp, issued in 1962

John Magrath

- Audrey P. Beck (1931–1983), college professor and Connecticut state legislator
- William Benton (1900–1973), U.S. Senator; later publisher of the Encyclopædia Britannica; lived in the city
- Thaddeus Betts (1789–1840), United States Senator from Connecticut
- William Thomas Clark (1831–1905), American Civil War general, U.S. Congressman, and abolitionist
- Darius N. Couch (1822–1897), naturalist and Union general in the Civil War; died in Norwalk
- Jeremiah Donovan (1857–1935), mayor and U.S. Congressman
- Thomas Fitch (1696–1774), colonial Governor of Connecticut
- Thomas Fitch, V (1725–1795), state representative; widely believed to be the original "Yankee Doodle Dandy"
- Irving Freese, five-term mayor of Norwalk; one of the few Socialists ever elected mayor in the United States
- Boris Johnson, prime minister of the United Kingdom, grew up in the city
- Alex Knopp, two-term mayor of Norwalk, 2001–2005
- Mia Love, United States Representative; raised in Norwalk
- Brien McMahon (1903–1952), United States Senator (D-CT), authored the Atomic Energy Act of 1946; born, raised, and is buried in Norwalk; namesake of one of the city's high schools
- Dick Moccia, elected mayor of Norwalk, Connecticut on November 8, 2005
- Isaac Sears (1729/1730–1786), merchant, sailor, and political figure during the American Revolution; raised in Norwalk
- Roger Stone (born 1952), Political consultant and author; renowned Conservative and avid supporter of the 45th President of the United States, Donald Trump
- Levi Warner (1831–1911), United States Representative from Connecticut
- Peter Willcox (born 1953), Greenpeace activist and former captain of the Rainbow Warrior; was raised in the city

== Other ==
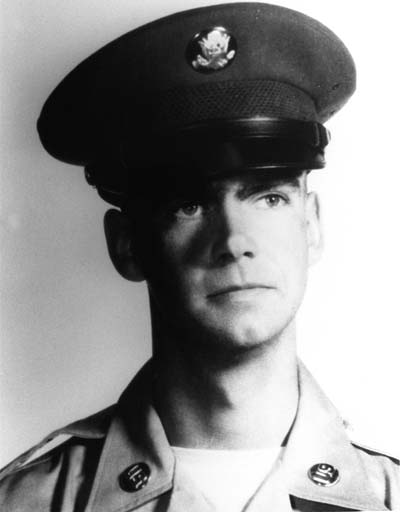
Daniel Shea

- Daniel T. Barry (born 1953), retired NASA astronaut; born in Norwalk
- Azor Betts (1740–1809), doctor who promoted smallpox inoculation
- Fanniebelle Curtis (1867–1940), kindergarten educator, educational administrator, in France during World War I
- Donald Drew Egbert (1902-1973), art historian and educator
- Sarah Louise Bouton Felt (1850–1928), first general president of the children's Primary organization of the Church of Jesus Christ of Latter-Day Saints
- Francis Gregory (1780–1866), U.S. Navy officer in the War of 1812 and the American Civil War; born in Norwalk
- Edward Calvin Kendall (1886–1972), chemist and Nobel Prize for Physiology or Medicine winner in 1950; born in South Norwalk
- LeGrand Lockwood (died February 1872), Wall Street financier; builder of the Lockwood-Mathews Mansion in Norwalk
- John D. Magrath (1924–1945), World War II Medal of Honor recipient; born in East Norwalk and is buried in Norwalk
- Charles O. Perry (1929–2011), sculptor, lived in East Norwalk and had his art studio in South Norwalk from 1977 until his death
- Alexander Rummler (1867–1959), painter, lived in the city for 35 years painting many scenes of Norwalk life
- Daniel J. Shea (1947–1969), recipient of the Medal of Honor in the Vietnam War; Shea Island in the Norwalk Islands was renamed in his honor
- Charles Robert Sherman (1788–1829), lawyer, Ohio public servant; father of William Tecumseh Sherman; born in Norwalk
- Mary Emma Woolley (1863–1947), president of Mount Holyoke College, 1901–1937; born in South Norwalk

== See also ==
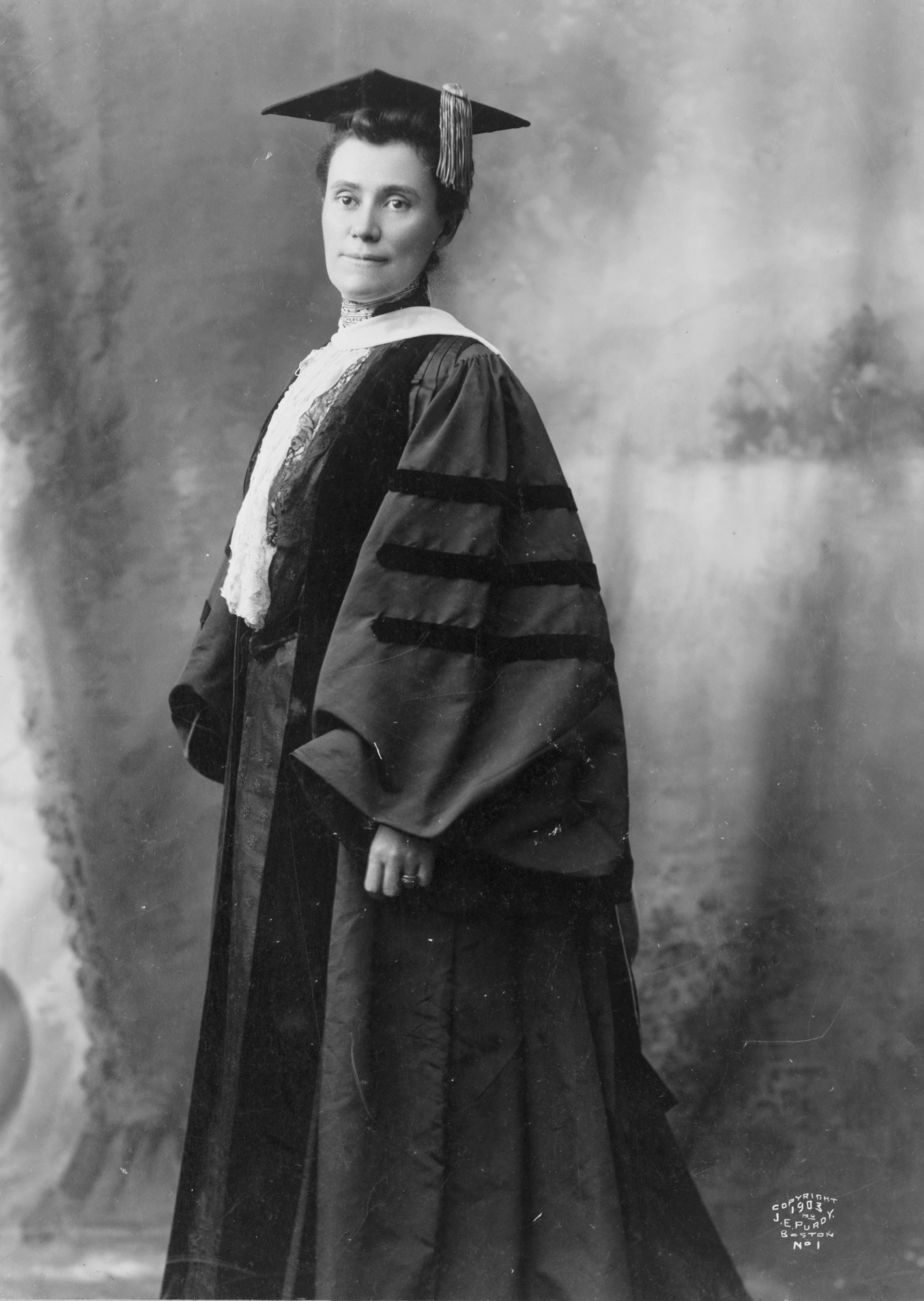
Mary Emma Woolley, president of Mount Holyoke College

- List of people from Connecticut
- List of people from Bridgeport, Connecticut
- List of people from Brookfield, Connecticut
- List of people from Darien, Connecticut
- List of people from Greenwich, Connecticut
- List of people from Hartford, Connecticut
- List of people from New Canaan, Connecticut
- List of people from New Haven, Connecticut
- List of people from Redding, Connecticut
- List of people from Ridgefield, Connecticut
- List of people from Stamford, Connecticut
- List of people from Westport, Connecticut
