= List of people from Ridgefield, Connecticut =

This is a list of notable people, past and present who have lived in Ridgefield, Connecticut or are closely associated with the town, listed by area in which they are best known:

== Authors, writers, playwrights, screenwriters ==
- Silvio A. Bedini (1917–2007), retired Smithsonian Institution curator, author, born and raised in Ridgefield
- Rich Cohen (born 1968), non-fiction writer
- Howard Fast (1914–2003), novelist
- Ira Joe Fisher (born 1947), CBS weatherman and poet (Some Holy Weight in the Village Air)
- Robert Fitzgerald (1910–1985), poet, critic and translator; he and his wife Sally called Ridgefield home and many sources repeat the assertion, though their residence was located in neighboring Redding
- Tom Gilroy, screenwriter, actor and film producer, graduated from Ridgefield High School in 1978
- Max Gunther (1926–1998), journalist and writer
- Tim Herlihy (born 1966), screenwriter, film producer, former head writer of Saturday Night Live
- Roger Kahn (1927–2020), author, lived on North Salem Road
- Irene Kampen (1923–1998), novelist and journalist
- Richard Kluger (born 1934), author
- Clare Boothe Luce (1903–1987), playwright, ambassador, politician, and wife of Henry Luce, lived on Great Hill Road
- Andy Luckey (born 1965), children's book author
- John Ames Mitchell (1844–1918), novelist, founder of Life magazine
- Allan Nevins (1891–1971), only writer to win the Pulitzer prize for historical biography twice (on Grover Cleveland and Hamilton Fish)
- Flannery O'Connor (1925–1964), writer often said to have lived in town when she was a boarder of Robert Fitzgerald's from 1949 to 1951, although Fitzgerald actually lived in neighboring Redding
- Eugene O'Neill (1888–1953), Nobel Prize-winning playwright, owned Brook Farm on North Salem Road from 1922 to 1927
- Brad Parks (born 1974), author
- Cornelius J. Ryan (1920–1974), author
- Mark Salzman (born 1959), author and actor who wrote about the town in his novel Lost in Place: Growing Up Absurd in Suburbia
- Richard Scarry (1919–1994), children's author
- Maurice Sendak (1928–2012), author and artist
- Robert Lewis Taylor (1912–1998), Pulitzer Prize-winning novelist (The Travels of Jaimie McPheeters, 1959)
- Alvin Toffler (1928–2016), futurist, author
- Abigail Goodrich Whittlesey (1788–1858), educator, publisher, editor
- Max Wilk (1920–2011), author
- Bari Wood (born 1936), author

== Actors, others in the dramatic arts ==
- David Cassidy (1950–2017), actor and singer
- Ralph Edwards (1913–2005), producer and host of television show Truth or Consequences
- Chris Elliott (born 1960), actor, comedian, author
- Giancarlo Esposito (born 1958), actor (current resident)
- Harvey Fierstein (born 1954), actor and playwright (current resident)
- Walter Hampden (1879–1955), actor
- Carolyn Kepcher (born 1969), appeared on the NBC show The Apprentice and ran Donald Trump's golf course in Briarcliff, New York (current resident)
- Cyril Ritchard (1897–1977), actor
- Grant Rosenmeyer (born 1991), actor
- Erland Van Lidth de Jeude (1953–1987), actor, wrestler, computer engineer and singer, grew up on Short Lane
- Robert Vaughn (1932–2016), actor
- Mary A. Wray (1804–1892), American actress

== Singers, musicians, composers ==
- Larry Adler (1914–2001), harmonica virtuoso, lived on Pumping Station Road
- Bert Buhrman (1915–1999), organist
- Judy Collins (born 1939), Grammy Award-winning folk singer (current resident)
- Aaron Copland (1900–1990), lived on Limestone Road
- Fanny Crosby (1820–1915), wrote more than 8,000 hymns, lived as a child at the corner of Main Street and Branchville Road
- Edwina Eustis Dick (1908–1997), contralto, pioneer in the field of music therapy, lived on Old Branchville Road
- Geraldine Farrar (1882–1967), Metropolitan Opera soprano, lived on West Lane and later New Street, where she died
- Andrew Gold (1951–2011), singer, songwriter, and musician, lived on St. Johns Road
- Stephen Jenks (1772–1856), composer and "teacher of psalmody", lived in Ridgefield
- Ed Kowalczyk (born 1971), singer, songwriter, musician and a founding member of the band Live
- Jim Lowe (1927–2016) singer, disc jockey and radio host
- Václav Nelhýbel (1919–1996), composer
- Alex North (1910–1991), film composer
- Noël Regney (1922–2002), pianist and songwriter
- Stephen Schwartz (born 1948), composer and lyricist (current resident)
- Debbie Shapiro (born 1954), singer (current resident)
- Maxim Shostakovich (born 1938), conductor (past resident)
- Jim Steinman (1947–2021), composer, lyricist, record producer, and playwright
- Frieder Weissmann (1893–1984), conductor and composer, lived on Prospect Ridge

== Artists, architects, designers, cartoonists ==
- Peggy Bacon (1895–1987), author and artist with works in the National Gallery of Art and Metropolitan Museum of Art
- Wayne Boring (1915–1982), an artist of Superman comic strips, lived on Lincoln Lane
- Sarah Bostwick (born 1979), visual artist
- Orlando Busino (1926–2022), cartoonist and author
- Roz Chast (born 1954), New Yorker cartoonist and book author (current resident)
- Niels Diffrient (1928–2013), industrial designer
- Cass Gilbert (1859–1934), architect, lived on Main Street
- Alexander Isley (born 1961), designer and educator (current resident)
- Alexander Julian (born 1948), designer (current resident)
- Robert Kraus (1925–2001), author, illustrator, and cartoonist
- Nicholas Krushenick (1929–1999), abstract artist, a dozen of whose works are in the National Gallery of Art
- Erik Nitsche (1908–1998), graphic designer
- Frederic Remington (1861–1909), painter, illustrator, and sculptor; died in Ridgefield in 1909, less than six months after moving to the town
- Julian Alden Weir (1852–1919), impressionist painter, bought Nod Hill Farm in 1882, now a National Historic Site
- Mahonri Young (1877–1957), grandson of Brigham Young; artist and sculptor

== Businessmen ==
- Lawrence Bossidy (born 1935-2025), retired CEO of AlliedSignal and General Electric (current resident)
- E.P. Dutton (1831–1923), publisher
- Joseph M. Juran (1904–1908), founder of the Juran Institute, lived on Old Branchville Road
- Edward M. Knox (1842–1916), military officer and hat company executive, lived in Downesbury Manor on Florida Hill Road
- Hans Peter Kraus (1907–1988), rare book dealer, author of A Rare Book Saga
- Arvind Krishna, CEO of IBM (current resident)
- John R. Patrick (born 1945), former IBM vice-president and innovative leader in the information technology industry, author of Net Attitude
- Jay S. Walker (born 1955), Priceline.com founder (current resident)
- Stephen Ward Jr., retired CEO of Lenovo (current resident)

== Journalists ==
- Todd Brewster, author, documentary film producer, former Senior Editorial Producer, ABC News (current resident)
- Morton Dean (born 1935), television journalist (current resident)
- Henry Luce (1898–1967), founder of Time magazine, husband of Clare Boothe Luce, lived on Great Hill Road
- David Manning, fictitious film reviewer said to be with the Ridgefield Press but created in a deceptive advertising campaign
- Westbrook Pegler (1894–1969), columnist and Pulitzer Prize winner (resident, 1941–1948)

== Government ==
- Joel Abbot (1776–1826), United States Congressman
- Jeremiah Donovan (1857–1935), United States Representative from Connecticut
- John H. Frey (born 1963), Minority Whip, Connecticut House of Representatives; Connecticut National Committeeman, Republican National Committee
- George E. Lounsbury (1838–1904), former Connecticut governor
- Phineas C. Lounsbury (1841–1925), former Connecticut governor
- Clare Boothe Luce (1903–1987), playwright, ambassador, politician, wife of Henry Luce, lived on Great Hill Road
- Theodore Sorensen (1928–2010), JFK advisor
- Norman Thomas (1884–1968), six-time Socialist candidate for president, spent summers in Ridgefield until the early 1920s
- Kurt Waldheim (1918–2007), U.N. secretary-general (1972–1981), frequently stayed at the estate of a friend in town

== Other ==
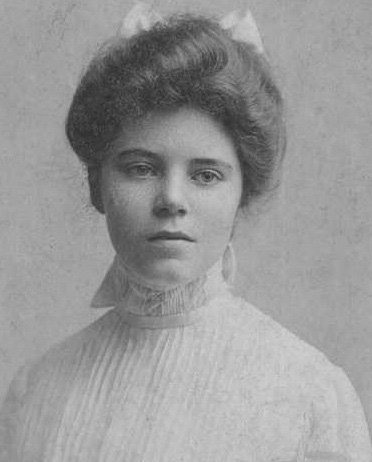
Alice Paul, 1901

- Anthony Alfredo (born 1999), NASCAR driver
- Blackleach Burritt (1744–1794), noted clergyman in the American Revolution
- Jolie Gabor (1896–1997), jewelry store-owing mother of the famous Gabor sisters—Eva, Magda, and Zsa Zsa—had a home on Oscaleta Road from 1966 to 1970
- Samuel Keeler (1656–1713), founding settler of Ridgefield
- Jeff Landau (born 1974), professional tennis player
- "Typhoid Mary" Mallon (1869–1938), who became famous for infecting people with typhoid, spent some time as a cook in town, where she infected some (according to brief front-page story in the July 22, 1909 Ridgefield Press)
- Matt Merullo (born 1965), former baseball player and scout for Arizona Diamondbacks
- Elmer Q. Oliphant (1892–1975), played with NFL's Buffalo All-Americans (1920s)
- Alice Paul (1885–1977), author of the proposed Equal Rights Amendment, author and suffragist, part-time resident
- George Scalise, owned a mansion on Lake Mamanasco, president of the Building Service Employees International Union
- Kieran Smith, competitive swimmer, Olympian
- Tucker West (born 1995), Olympic luger
- Sarah Bishop (died 1810), pirate and later hermit
- Phoebe Schecter, NFL Analyst, football player and coach

== See also ==
- List of people from Connecticut
- List of people from Bridgeport, Connecticut
- List of people from Brookfield, Connecticut
- List of people from Darien, Connecticut
- List of people from Greenwich, Connecticut
- List of people from Hartford, Connecticut
- List of people from New Canaan, Connecticut
- List of people from New Haven, Connecticut
- List of people from Norwalk, Connecticut
- List of people from Redding, Connecticut
- List of people from Stamford, Connecticut
- List of people from Westport, Connecticut
