= List of people from Hartford, Connecticut =

The following list includes people who were born in, lived in or are otherwise closely connected with the city of Hartford, Connecticut, United States.

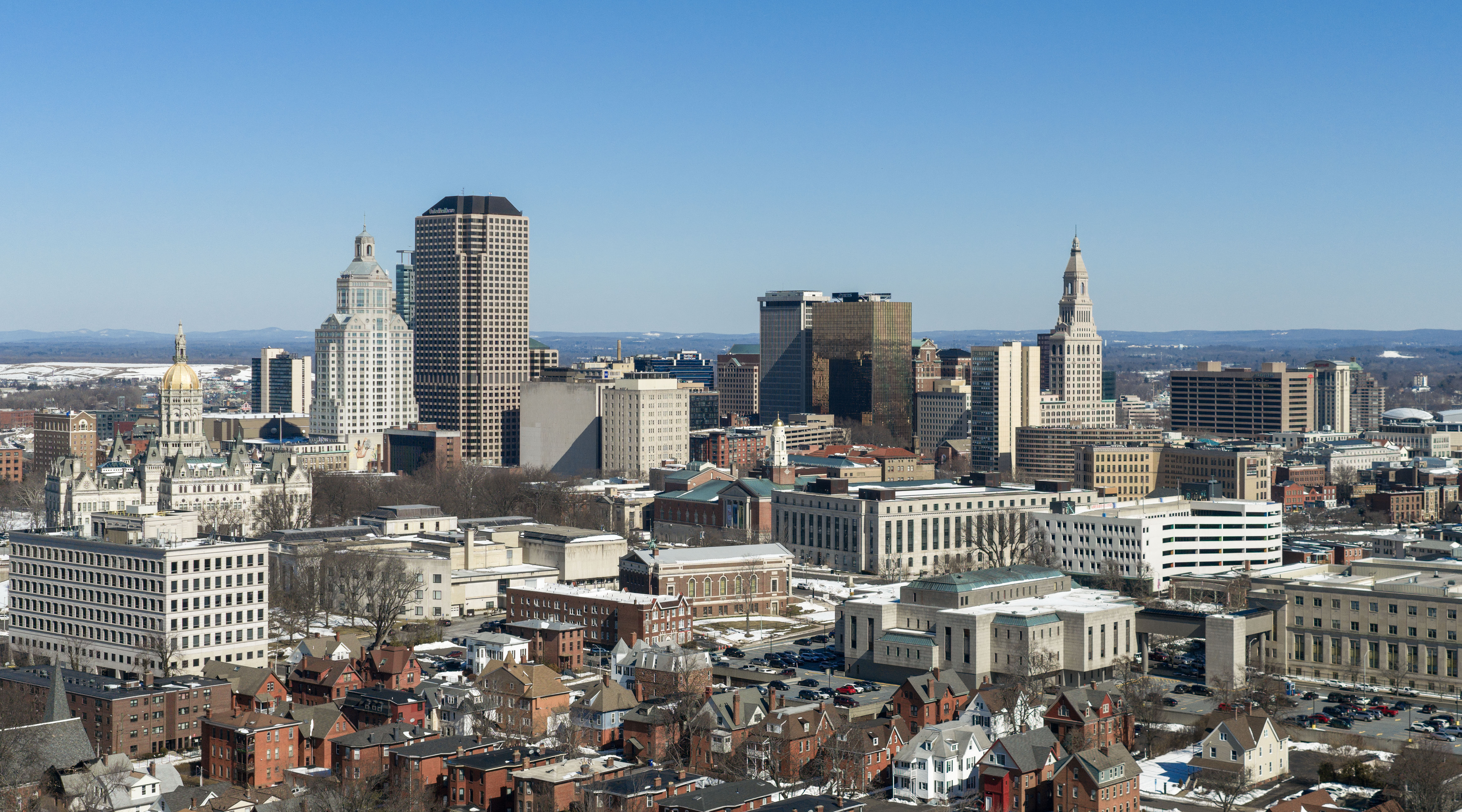
Hartford, Connecticut, skyline (2026)

== Academia ==
- August Coppola, academic, film executive and father of Nicolas Cage
- Michael C. FitzGerald (born 1953), art historian and Picasso scholar at Trinity College in Hartford
- Stephen Cole Kleene (1909–1994), mathematician and professor
- Spencer Shaw (1916–2010), librarian and professor at the University of Washington

== Art and architecture ==
- A. Everett "Chick" Austin (1900–1957), arts innovator and director of the Wadsworth Atheneum
- Nadine M. DeLawrence (1953–1992), African-American visual artist; born and raised in Hartford
- Dorothea H. Denslow (1900–1971), sculptor, educator
- George Keller (1842–1935), architect, noted for Hartford's Soldiers' and Sailors' Arch and Hartford Union Station
- Kathleen Kucka (born 1962), abstract painter
- Frederick Law Olmsted (1822–1903), landscape architect and urban planner, noted for many of the New York City parks and Stanford University's campus

== Business ==
- Samuel Colt (1814–1862), firearm inventor and industrialist
- J. P. Morgan (1837–1913), financier and industrialist
- Albert A. Pope (1843–1909), manufacturer of Pope Manufacturing Company automobiles and bicycles
- Amos Whitney (1832–1920), mechanical engineer, inventor and co-founder of Pratt & Whitney company

== Entertainment ==
=== Film and television ===
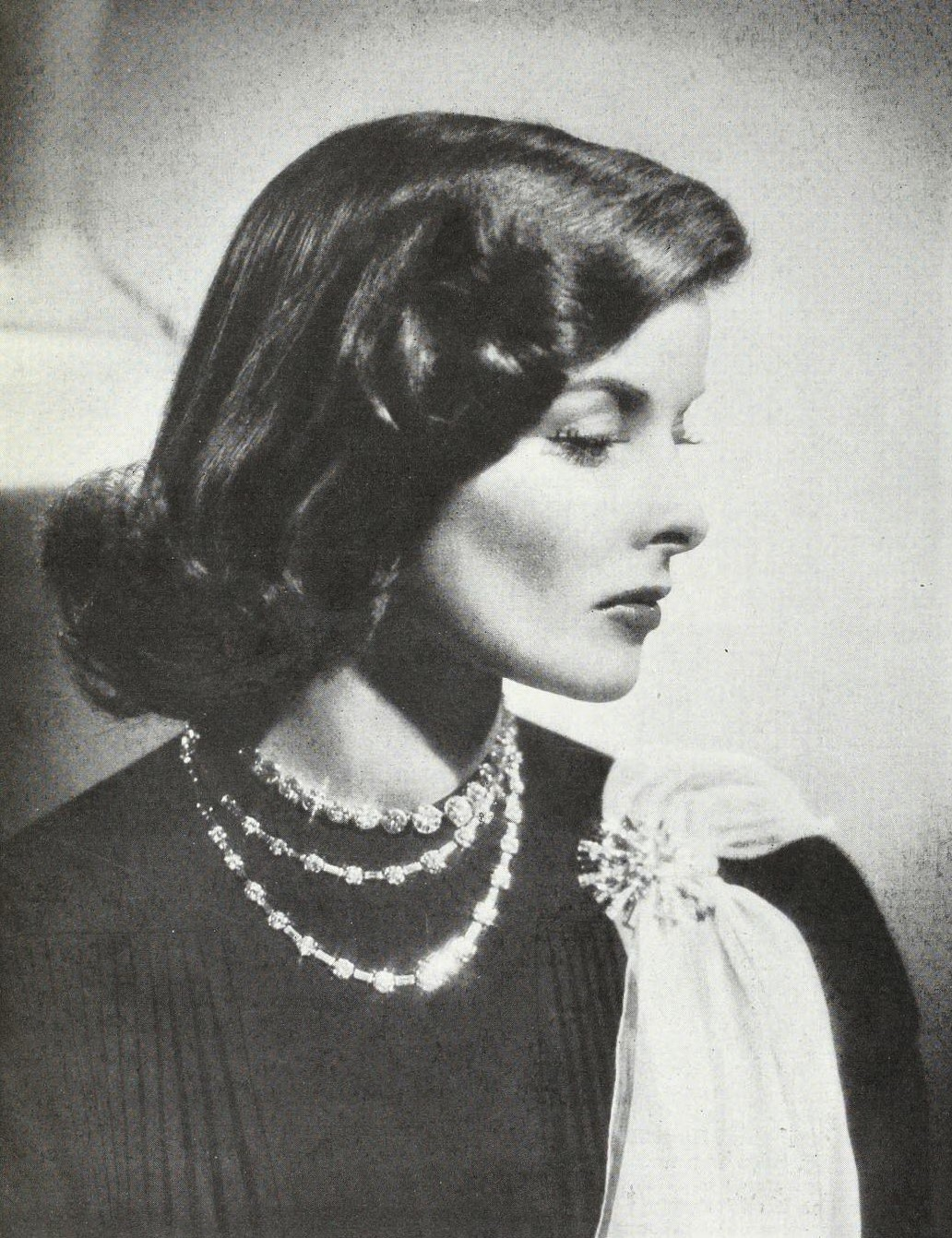
Katharine Hepburn in 1938

- Robert Ames (1889–1931), stage and screen actor
- Julie Banderas (born 1973), Emmy Award-winning, television news anchor
- David Alan Basche (born 1968), actor
- Ed Begley (1901–1970), actor
- Amy Brenneman (born 1964), actress, best known for the television series Judging Amy
- Christopher Briney (born 1998), actor, best known for Dalíland and The Summer I Turned Pretty
- Brooke Burke (born 1971), television personality, model and dancer
- Ben Cooper, best known for western films and television appearances in the 1960s and 1970s
- Ann Corio (1914–1999), burlesque star
- Anthony Crane (born 1963), former pornographic actor
- Peter Dante (born 1968), actor
- Jenna Dewan (born 1980), actress
- Linda Evans (born 1942), actress, best known for Dynasty
- Totie Fields (1930–1978), comedian
- Will Friedle (born 1976), actor and voice actor
- Arty Froushan (born 1993), actor
- William Gillette (1853–1937), actor, director, famed for playing Sherlock Holmes on stage
- Tyrone Giordano (born 1976), actor
- Thomas Ian Griffith (born 1962), actor, producer, screenwriter, musician and martial artist; best known for playing Terry Silver in The Karate Kid Part III and Cobra Kai
- Katharine Hepburn (1907–2003), Oscar-winning actress; buried in the Hepburn family plot in Cedar Hill Cemetery
- Elyse Knox (1917–2012), model and actress; wife of Tom Harmon and mother of Mark Harmon
- Eriq La Salle (born 1962), actor known for the television show ER
- Norman Lear (1922–2023), television producer
- Ken Ober, host of Remote Control
- Peter Paige (born 1969), actor
- Charles Nelson Reilly (1931–2007), actor, director and TV personality
- Ken Richters (born 1955), stage actor, playwright, and voice actor, known for impersonations of Mark Twain
- Michael Schur (born 1976), producer, actor and director
- Michael Stefano (born 1969), pornographic actor
- Tony Todd, Broadway, film and television actor
- Wavy Gravy, hippie icon, entertainer, and peace activist
- Emily Wright (born 1980), songwriter, producer and engineer
- Kim Zolciak (born 1978), star of The Real Housewives of Atlanta, country music singer

=== Music ===
- Igor Buketoff (1915–2001), conductor
- Kurt Carr, gospel music composer and performer
- Fates Warning, progressive metal band formed in 1982
- Charles Flores (1970–2012), jazz bassist and member of the Michel Camilo Trio
- Grayson Hugh, singer-songwriter
- Natália Kelly, singer
- Barbara Kolb (born 1939), composer
- Mark McGrath (born 1968), lead singer of Sugar Ray
- Jackie McLean (1931–2006), jazz alto saxophonist and educator
- Notch, R&B, dancehall and Reggaeton artist
- Gene Pitney (1940–2006), singer
- Jeff Porcaro (1954–1992), of the rock band Toto
- Joe Porcaro, jazz drummer; father of Jeff and Steve Porcaro
- Mike Porcaro (1955–2015), of the rock band Toto
- Steve Porcaro (born 1957), of the rock band Toto
- Doobie Powell, gospel musician and pastor
- Sophie Tucker (1884–1966), "last of the red-hot mamas," singer and comedian

=== Radio ===
- Jason Jackson, hosted a local sports radio show on ESPN Radio
- Phil Tonken (1919–2000), announcer at New York station WOR-AM-TV

== Law ==
- Frank A. Hooker, chief justice of the Michigan Supreme Court

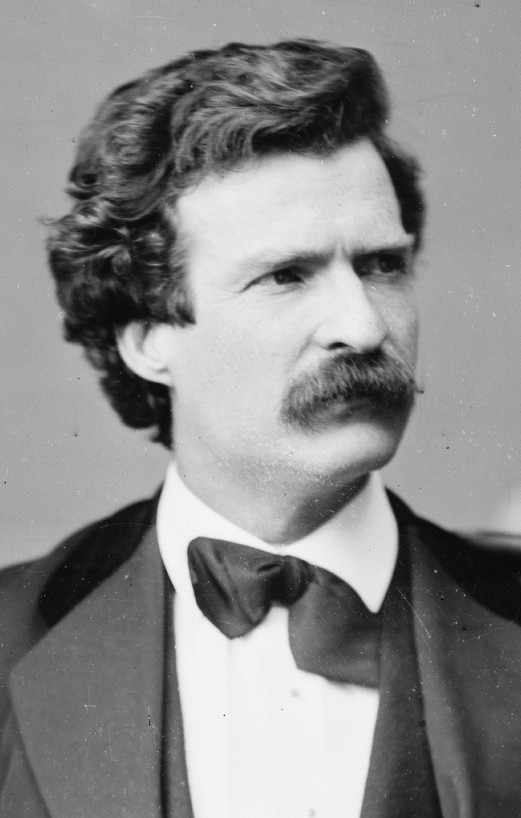
Mark Twain, photograph taken in 1871, three years before he moved to the city

== Literature and journalism ==
- Steven Anzovin, non-fiction writer; known for his Famous First Facts book series
- Bill Branon, novelist
- Oliver Butterworth (1915–1990), children's author and educator
- Suzanne Collins (born 1962), author of the Hunger Games trilogy
- Lyn Crost (1915–1997), World War II correspondent
- Tom Curry (1900–1976), pulp fiction writer
- Mary Ann Hanmer Dodd (1813–1878), poet
- Dominick Dunne (1925–2009), writer
- John Gregory Dunne (1932–2003), writer
- Austin Gary, novelist
- Stephenie Meyer (born 1973), author of Twilight series novels
- Jim Murray (1919–1998), Pulitzer Prize-winning sports columnist of the Los Angeles Times
- Greensbury Washington Offley (1808–1896), slave narrative author and minister
- Lydia Sigourney (1791–1865), poet
- Wallace Stevens (1879–1955), poet; insurance executive
- Harriet Beecher Stowe (1811–1896), author of Uncle Tom's Cabin, settled in Hartford during the 1870s; her Nook Farm home is open to the public and adjoins Mark Twain's
- Mark Twain (real name Samuel Langhorne Clemens) (1835–1910), author known for The Adventures of Tom Sawyer, A Connecticut Yankee in King Arthur's Court, and The Adventures of Huckleberry Finn
- Ocean Vuong (born 1988), poet and novelist, author of On Earth We’re Briefly Gorgeous

== Military ==
- William Bryden (1880–1972), U.S. Army major general
- John H. Fenimore V (born 1941), born in Hartford, Adjutant General of New York
- John H. Griebel (1901–1969), Marine Corps general
- Joseph B. Murdock (1851–1931), US Navy rear admiral
- Sherwood C. Spring (born 1944), United States Army colonel, test pilot and astronaut
- Griffin Alexander Stedman (1838–1864), Union Army colonel
- Alfred Terry (1827–1890), Union army general
- Robert O. Tyler (1831–1874), Union army general
- Donald M. Weller (1908–1985), Marine Corps general and pioneer in Naval gunfire support

== Politics ==
- Parmenio Adams (1776–1832), United States congressman; born in Hartford
- James J. Barbour (1869–1946), Illinois lawyer and state legislator; born in Hartford
- L. Paul Bremer (born 1941), ex-administrator of US-occupied Iraq and foreign service officer
- Harold V. Camp (1935–2022), Connecticut lawyer, state legislator, and businessman
- Charles R. Chapman, mayor of Hartford, served in both houses of Connecticut legislature
- Ezra Clark Jr. (1813–1896), US representative
- Horace S. Cooley, Illinois secretary of state
- William A. DiBella, majority leader of the Connecticut State Senate
- Frank Fasi, major of Hawaii
- George A. French, Minnesota state legislator and lawyer
- Elizabeth Bartlett Grannis (1840–1926), suffragist, social reformer, editor
- Thomas Hooker, founder of Connecticut
- Bruce Hyer, Green Party of Canada Member of Parliament
- Wilfred X. Johnson (1920–1972), first African American elected to the Connecticut General Assembly
- John B. Larson (born 1948), U.S. representative for Connecticut
- A. Lucille Matarese, Connecticut state legislator and Roman Catholic Benedictine nun
- Edward Ralph May (1819–1852), only delegate to the Indiana Constitutional Convention of 1850 to vote in favor of African American suffrage
- Elizabeth May, former Sierra Club of Canada president and former leader of the Green Party of Canada
- Alice Merritt (1876–1950), first woman to serve in the Connecticut State Senate (1925–1929); represented Hartford
- Rachel Taylor Milton, community activist and Connecticut Women's Hall of Fame inductee
- Chris Murphy (born 1973), U.S. senator, U.S. congressman
- Lewis Rome (1933–2015), Connecticut State Senate leader and Republican Party nominee in the 1982 Connecticut gubernatorial election
- Maria W. Stewart, abolitionist
- Thomas A. Sullivan, Wisconsin state assemblyman
- Elmer Watson, US Army officer and Connecticut State Senate majority leader

== Religion ==
- Horace Bushnell (1802–1876), Congregational minister and theologian
- Mary E. Van Lennep (1821–1844), missionary, school founder, memoirist

== Science and medicine ==
- Ring Cardé (born 1943), entomologist
- Barbara McClintock (1902–1992), cytogeneticist, awarded the 1983 Nobel Prize in Physiology or Medicine
- Frederick E. Olmsted (1872–1925), forester and one of the founders of American forestry
- Alexander Rich (1925–2015), biologist and biophysicist
- Paul Schimmel (born 1940), biophysical chemist and translational medicine pioneer
- Theodore Wirth (1863–1949), horticulturalist and park planner

== Sports ==
- Michael Adams (born 1963), NBA player
- Steve Berthiaume, ESPN anchor
- Nick Bonino (born 1988), NHL player
- Marcus Camby (born 1974), NBA player
- John Carney (born 1964), NFL placekicker
- Jacob Conde (born 1992), soccer player who represented the Puerto Rico national team
- Mike Crispino, sportscaster for WVIT and WRCH, and ESPN
- Andre Drummond (born 1993), NBA player for the Los Angeles Lakers
- Jayson Durocher (born 1974), MLB player for the Milwaukee Brewers
- Johnny Egan (1939–2022), NBA player
- Dwight Freeney (born 1980), NFL player
- Craig Janney (born 1968), NHL player
- Tyrique Jones (born 1997), basketball player for Hapoel Tel Aviv in the Israeli Basketball Premier League
- Rick Mahorn (born 1958), NBA player
- Eric Mangini (born 1971), head coach of Cleveland Browns and New York Jets
- Mike McGuirl (born 1998), basketball player for Hapoel Haifa in the Israeli Basketball Premier League
- Stephanie McMahon, businesswoman, professional wrestling personality
- Alex Mighten (born 2002), footballer
- Cliff Olander (born 1955), player of gridiron football
- Steve Potts (born 1967), former West Ham United footballer, current U21 coach
- Ryan Preece (born 1990), NASCAR driver
- Eugene Robinson (born 1963), NFL player
- Will Solomon (born 1978), basketball player
- Charley Steiner, Los Angeles Dodgers sportscaster
- John Sullivan (born 1961), NFL player
- Roderick G. (Rod) Taylor (1943–2014), Olympic skier
- Tony Younger (born 1980), American-Israeli basketball player in the Israeli National League

== Other ==
- Nathaniel Bar-Jonah (1957–2008), convicted child molester and a suspected serial killer and cannibal
- Howard Long (1905–1939), convicted murderer and child molester
- Martha Bulloch Roosevelt (1835–1884), mother of president Theodore Roosevelt and grandmother of Eleanor Roosevelt

== See also ==
- List of people from Connecticut
- List of people from Bridgeport, Connecticut
- List of people from Brookfield, Connecticut
- List of people from Darien, Connecticut
- List of people from Greenwich, Connecticut
- List of people from New Canaan, Connecticut
- List of people from New Haven, Connecticut
- List of people from Norwalk, Connecticut
- List of people from Redding, Connecticut
- List of people from Ridgefield, Connecticut
- List of people from Stamford, Connecticut
- List of people from Westport, Connecticut
