= List of people from Stamford, Connecticut =

This is a list of notable people in the past and present associated with Stamford, Connecticut.

== Art ==
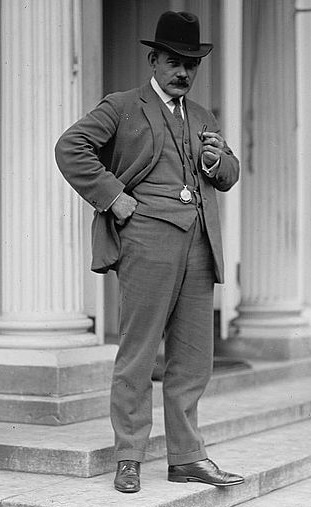
Gutzon Borglum at the White House, 1924

- Gutzon Borglum (1867–1941), sculptor of Mount Rushmore, lived in Stamford 1910–1920
- Paul Calle (1928–2010), artist who created the 1969 stamp commemorating the first crewed Moon landing
- J.A. Ten Eyck III (1893–1932), painter and etcher
- Helen Frankenthaler (1928–2011), artist, had a home in the Shippan section of town
- Joe Harris (1928–2017), commercial illustrator and storyboard artist, creator of Underdog and the Trix Rabbit
- Hildreth Meière (1892–1961), artist and designer, lived in North Stamford
- Alex Raymond (1909–1956), creator of the Flash Gordon comic strip, lived in North Stamford
- Kevin Salatino, art curator and former director of Huntington Library and Bowdoin College Museum of Art
- Alexander Rummler (c.1867–1959), painter, lived in the city

== Business ==
- Ralph Bahna (1942–2014), CEO of Cunard Line, chairman of Priceline.com, founder of Club Quarters
- Robin Bennett Kanarek, nurse, philanthropist, and author
- Jeph Loeb (born 1958), comic book writer, film and television writer, producer, former head of Marvel Television
- Vince McMahon (born 1945) and Linda McMahon (born 1948), founders of World Wrestling Entertainment

== Entertainers ==
- Christopher Abbott (born 1986), actor
- Elizabeth Crocker Bowers (1830–1895), stage actress and theatrical manager, also known professionally as Mrs. D. P. Bowers
- Michael Dante (born 1931), actor and professional baseball player, born in the city
- Dana Delany (born 1956), actress, grew up in Stamford
- Kenny Delmar (1910–1986), actor, died in the city
- Kim Greist (born 1958), actress, was born in the city
- Eileen Heckart (1919–2001), Oscar-winning actress and city resident
- John Henson (born 1967), comedian, was born in the city
- Earl Hindman (1942–2003), actor, died in the city
- Harry Houdini (1874–1926), escape artist, had a summer home in Stamford
- Alan Kalter (1943–2021), announcer on Late Show with David Letterman, lived in the city
- Christopher Lloyd (born 1938), actor, born in Stamford
- Antonio Macia, screenwriter and actor
- Don Morrow (1927–2020), actor, announcer and voiceover artist
- Bill Moseley (born 1951), horror film actor, was born in the city
- Chris Noth (born 1954), actor
- Louise Platt (1915–2003), theatre and film actress, was born in the city
- Bruce Prichard (born 1963), professional wrestling executive
- Gilda Radner (1946–1989), comedian, actress, wife of Gene Wilder, lived in the city
- Katherine Reback (1950/51–2010), screenwriter (Fools Rush In), was a native of Stamford
- Rosemary Rice (1925–2012), actress (Mama), voice-over artist and children's musician
- Dan Sileo (born 1963), athlete, radio host, was born in the city
- Henry Simmons (born 1970), actor, was born in the city
- Stephen Sondheim (1930–2021), composer, lived in North Stamford when he was a boy
- Grant Tinker (1926–2016), former husband of Mary Tyler Moore and former chairman and CEO of NBC (1981–1986), was born in the city
- Mark Tinker (born 1951), producer, director, and writer, was born in the city
- Vivian Vance (1909–1979), actress who starred as Ethel Mertz in I Love Lucy
- Fredi Washington (1903–1994), actress, died in the city
- Marc Weiner (born 1955), Jewish comedian, clown, puppeteer, and television producer, lives in the city
- Gene Wilder (1933–2016), actor and director, lived and died in the city
- Peggy Wood (1892–1978), actress, member of the Algonquin Round Table, died in the city

== Government and politics ==
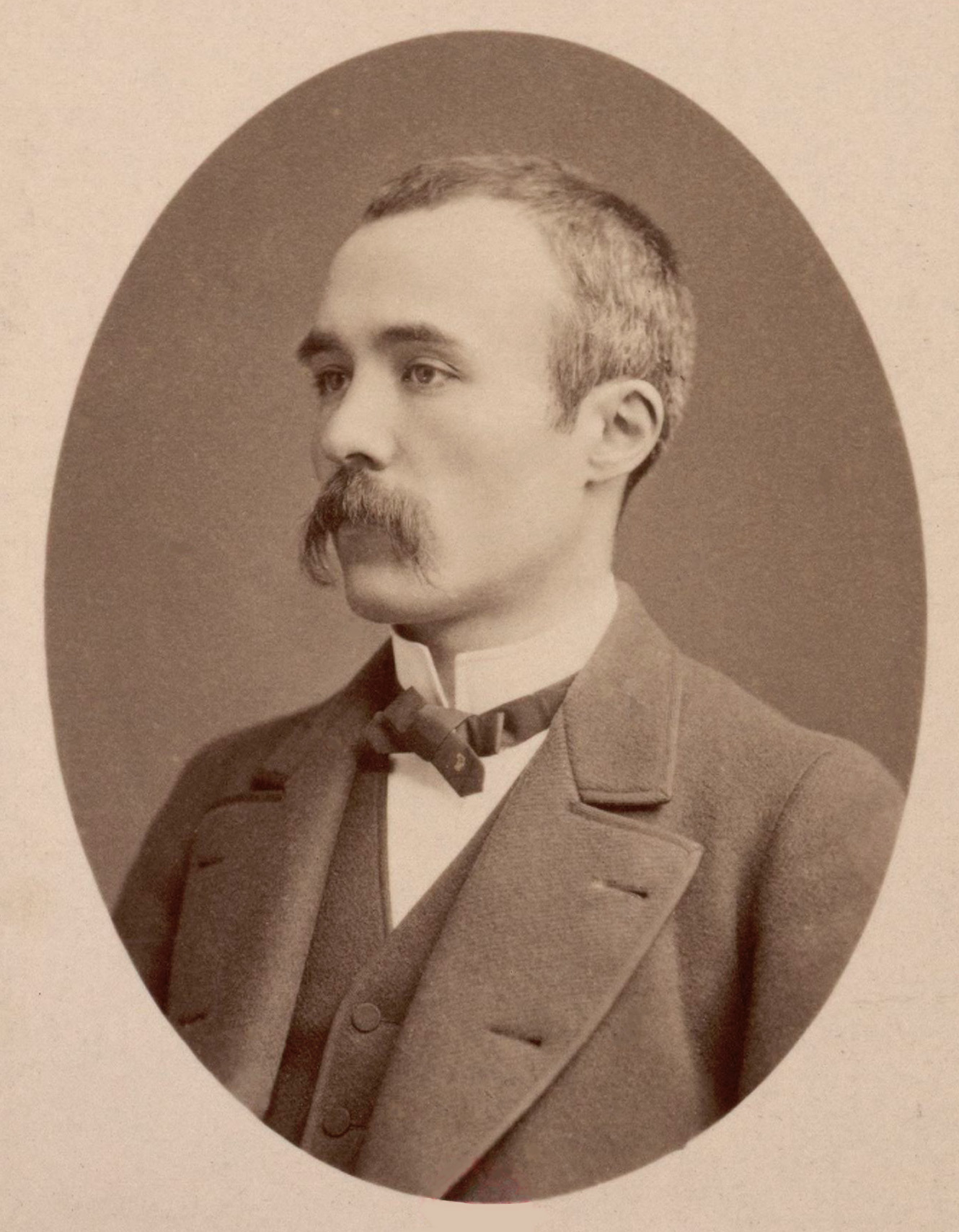
French Premier Georges Clemenceau by Nadar

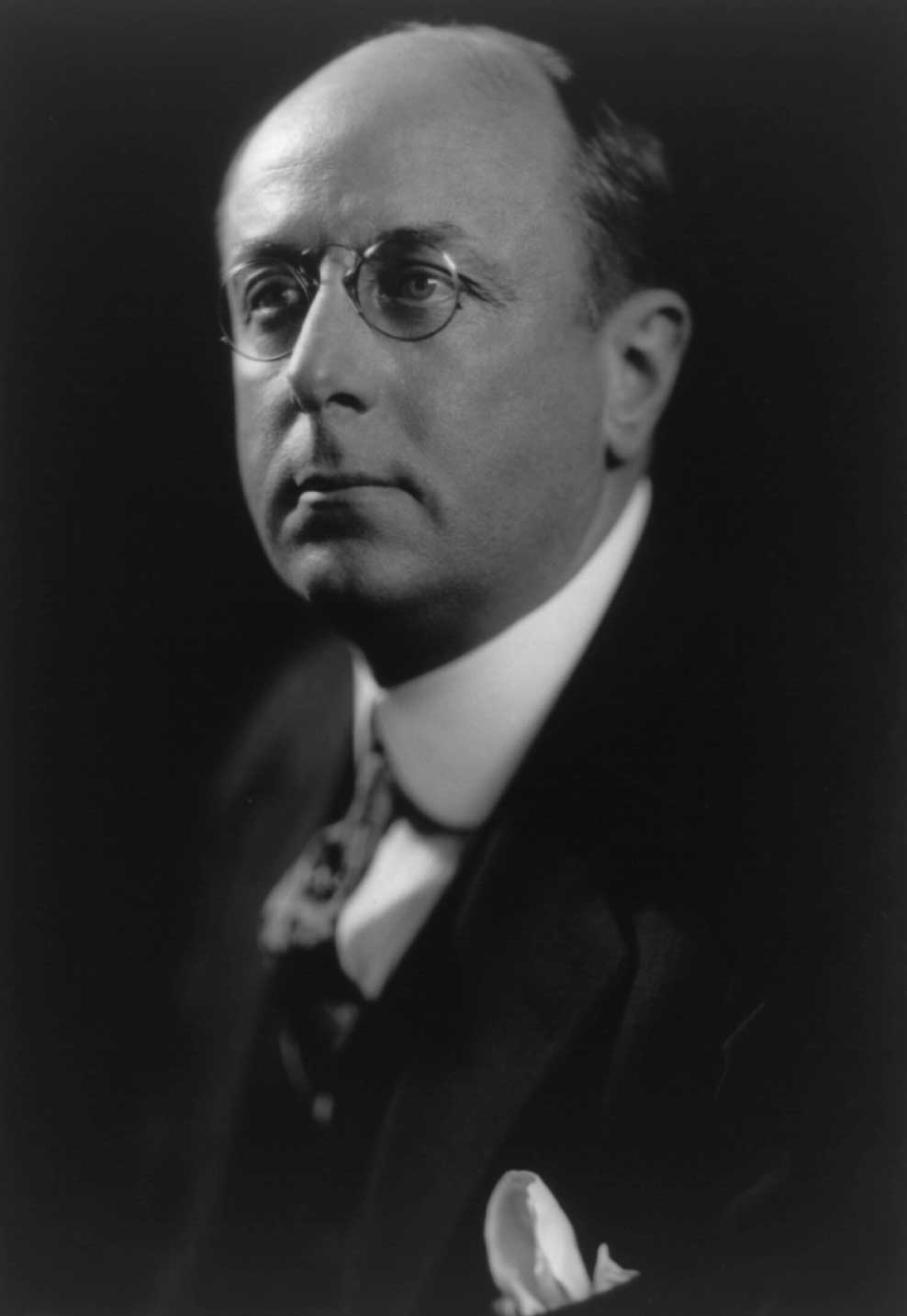
Homer Cummings

- Frank Aranow (1883–1971), lawyer and member of the New York State Assembly; resided in Stamford at the end of his life
- Andrew P. Bakaj (born 1982), former Department of Defense and CIA ifficial; lead counsel for the Whisteblower during the impeachment inquiry and the subsequent impeachment of President Donald Trump, born and raised in Stamford
- J. Cofer Black (born 1950), former United States Department of State coordinator for Counterterrorism with the rank of ambassador at-large (2002–2004); born in Stamford
- Georges Clemenceau (1841–1929), French premier during World War I; one of the major voices behind the Treaty of Versailles; taught in a girls' school in Stamford
- Homer Stille Cummings (1870–1956), United States attorney general, 1933–1939; in 1900, 1901, and 1904, he was elected mayor of Stamford; helped found the Cummings & Lockwood law firm in 1909
- Charles A. Duelfer, chief U.S. weapons inspector in Iraq; raised in Stamford
- Joe Lieberman (born 1942), U.S. senator and 2000 Democratic nominee for vice president; born in Stamford
- Dan Malloy (born 1955), governor of Connecticut
- John J. McCloy (1895–1989), prominent adviser to President Franklin D. Roosevelt and President Ronald Reagan; died in Stamford
- William T. Minor (1815–1889), 39th governor of Connecticut, consul-general to Havana, Cuba and judge on the Connecticut Superior Court; born in Stamford
- Candace Owens (born 1989), conservative commentator and political activist
- Jen Psaki (born 1978), former White House press secretary
- Chris Shays (born 1945), Fourth District U.S. representative; former resident of Stamford

== Literature, writing, journalism ==
- Christopher Buckley (born 1952), novelist, editor, William F. Buckley's son, partly grew up in the Cove section
- William F. Buckley, Jr. (1925–2008), founder of National Review magazine, longtime resident in the Cove section
- Albert K. Dawson (1885–1967), photojournalist and film correspondent in World War I; his firm "Brown & Dawson" was based in Stamford 1912–1919
- Eric Jay Dolin (born 1961), author of numerous books on American history; lived in Stamford 1971–1979
- Greg Farshtey (born 1965), author, editor at Lego, known for his work on Bionicle, grew up in Stamford
- Estelle Feinstein (1923–2002), University of Connecticut professor, local historian, lived 45 years in Stamford
- Chris Hansen (born 1959), television journalist, lives in the city
- Harry Harrison (born Henry Maxwell Dempsey, 1925–2012), science-fiction author, was born in the city
- John Hawkes (1925–1998), novelist, was born in the city
- Carol Iovanna (born 1952), newscaster on Fox News, is a resident of the city
- Jeph Loeb, comic book, screen, and television writer, and television and motion picture producer, grew up in Stamford
- J. D. Salinger (1919–2010), author of The Catcher in the Rye, lived in north Stamford briefly in the late 1940s
- Chuck Scarborough (born 1943), television news anchor, lives in North Stamford
- Anthony Julian Tamburri (born 1949), professor, scholar, publisher (Bordighera Press); writes on literature and cinema
- Dana Tyler (born 1958), news anchor for WCBS-TV in New York City, lives in Stamford
- Mort Walker (1923–2018), comic artist, lived in Stamford

== Music ==
- Dave Abbruzzese (born 1968), Pearl Jam's drummer, 1991–1994, was born in the city
- Michael Bolton (born 1953), singer, lived in North Stamford
- Henry "Harry" Thacker Burleigh (1866–1949), singer who made "Swing Low, Sweet Chariot," a nineteenth-century spiritual, popular (in a 1917 compilation); died in the city
- Michael Cuscuna (1948–2024), jazz record producer and founder of Mosaic Records
- Willy DeVille (1950–2009), R&B singer and composer, was born in Stamford in 1950
- Dorothy Fields (1905–1974), lyricist, rented Buttonwood Manor in North Stamford from William E. Stevens during World War II
- Benny Goodman (1909–1986), the 'King of Swing', lived the last 20 years of his life in Stamford; buried in Long Ridge Cemetery
- Jimmy Ienner (born 1945), music producer
- Jim Koplik, concert promoter, city resident since 1981
- Jim Kweskin (born 1940), sang "Ladybugs' Picnic", born in Stamford; went to school at Brunswick School
- Cyndi Lauper (born 1953), singer, has a home in North Stamford
- Meat Loaf (born 1947), rock singer and songwriter, lived in Stamford 1979–1982, coached Babe Ruth League and Little League baseball, born in Dallas, Texas
- Moby (born 1965), recording artist, previously lived in the South End
- Ezio Pinza (1892–1957), a star of the Metropolitan Opera, lived in the West Side
- Lara Raj (born 2005), singer and member of Katseye, was born in the city
- Rhea Raj (born 2000), singer and songwriter, was born in the city
- Rakim (born 1968), rapper, lives in the city
- Chris Risola (born 1958), musician and songwriter, lead guitarist of Steelheart, was born in the city
- Sasha Sokol (born 1970), Mexican singer, has a home in Stamford
- Andrew Sterling (1874–1955), lyricist, died in Stamford
- Rida Johnson Young (1869–1926), lyricist, died in the city

== Religion ==
- Job Bishop (1760–1831), Shaker leader and community founder, born and raised in Stamford
- James Davenport (1716–1757), clergyman and itinerant preacher noted for often controversial actions during the First Great Awakening, born in Stamford
- Frederick Dibblee (1753–1826), Canadian Church of England clergyman
- Lubomyr Husar (1933–2017), major archbishop of the Ukrainian Greek Major-Archdiocese of Lviv, was educated at St. Basil's College in Stamford
- Cardinal Ignatius Pin-Mei Kung (1901–2000), Roman Catholic bishop of Shanghai, China from 1950 until his death, lived his final years in Stamford
- Robert Lombardo (1957–), auxiliary bishop of Chicago
- Thaddeus F. Malanowski (1922–2020), deputy chief of chaplains of the U.S. Army
- Harriet Bradford Tiffany Stewart (1798–1830), missionary

== Sports ==
- Semyon Belits-Geiman (born 1945), Olympic medal-winning swimmer
- Keith Bennett (born 1961), American-Israeli basketball player
- Andy Bloom (born 1973), Olympic shot putter
- Matt Brennan (1897–1963), NFL player
- Garry Cobb (born 1957), NFL football player
- David Cone (born 1963), former MLB pitcher
- Michael Dante (born 1931), former professional baseball player and later a television and film actor, was born in the city
- Chris Dudley (born 1965), former NBA basketball player for teams including the Cleveland Cavaliers and New York Knicks; born in Stamford
- Fred Dugan (1933–2018), NFL player with SF 49ers, Dallas Cowboys and Washington Redskins
- Gigi Fernández (born 1964), member of the International Tennis Hall of Fame
- Jane Geddes (born 1960), winner of 11 LPGA Tour events
- Ryan Haggerty (born 1993), NHL hockey player on the Pittsburgh Penguins
- J. Walter Kennedy (1912–1977), NBA commissioner (1963–1975) and former athletic director at St. Basil's Preparatory School in Stamford; born in Stamford
- Parker Kligerman (born 1990), NASCAR driver, born in Stamford
- Dick Mayer (1924–1989), professional golfer, born in Stamford
- Dave Puzzuoli (born 1961), NFL football player
- Andy Robustelli (1925–2011), member of the Pro Football Hall of Fame; born and raised in Stamford
- Alex Rodriguez (born 1975), MLB player, has a home in Stamford
- Boris Said (born 1962), NASCAR driver, raised in Stamford
- Dan Sileo (born 1964), former NFL player and currently a radio personality in Los Angeles on The Mighty 1090, born and raised in Stamford
- William E. Stevenson (1900–1985), 1924 Olympic gold medal winner in track; president of Oberlin College; bought Buttonwood Manor in North Stamford in 1937
- Gene Tunney (1897–1978), boxing champion; interred in Long Ridge Union Cemetery in Stamford
- Bobby Valentine (born 1950), former baseball player and former manager of the Boston Red Sox, owner of downtown sports bar "Bobby V's", a downtown sports bar, the city's director of Public Health and Safety, born in Stamford
- Herb Williams (born 1958), former NBA player and current New York Knicks assistant coach, has a home in Stamford

== Other ==
- Charles Benedict Davenport (1866–1944), biologist and eugenicist
- Sandra Diaz-Twine (born 1974), two-time winner of Survivor (Pearl Islands and Heroes vs. Villains)
- Dennis Gabor (1900–1979), worked at the CBS Research Lab in Stamford and won a Nobel Prize in Physics
- Ina Garten (born 1948), cooking author, grew up in the city
- Esther A. Hopkins (1926–2021), chemist, environmental attorney and Framingham's first African-American selectwoman, born in Stamford
- Stephanie Izard, James Beard Foundation Award-winning chef; winner of Top Chef (season 4), grew up in Stamford.
- Robert Jaffe (born approx. 1946), physicist, grew up in Stamford
- Robert Jarvik (born 1946), inventor of the first artificial heart, was reared in Stamford
- Harold June (1895–1962), U.S. Navy test pilot and Antarctic aviator
- F. N. Monjo (1875–1929), Arctic fur trader
- C. Henry Phillips (1820–1882), inventor of magnesium hydroxide, lived in and had a factory making the product in town
- Martha Pollack (born 1958), president of Cornell University
- Barry Preedom (1940–2025), physicist
- Thomas H. Ruger (1833–1907), Union general in the Civil War and superintendent of West Point, died in the city
- Will Shortz (born 1952), puzzle editor of The New York Times, current resident and organizer of the annual World Puzzle Championship, which was held in Stamford in 2000
- David Hammond Vinton (1803–1870), Civil War brevet major general
- Mort Walker (1923–2018), cartoonist for Beetle Bailey and Hi and Lois

== See also ==
- List of people from Connecticut
- List of people from Bridgeport, Connecticut
- List of people from Brookfield, Connecticut
- List of people from Darien, Connecticut
- List of people from Greenwich, Connecticut
- List of people from Hartford, Connecticut
- List of people from New Canaan, Connecticut
- List of people from New Haven, Connecticut
- List of people from Norwalk, Connecticut
- List of people from Redding, Connecticut
- List of people from Ridgefield, Connecticut
- List of people from Westport, Connecticut
