= List of people from Redding, Connecticut =

People associated with Redding, Connecticut, listed in the area they are best known:

== Actors, musicians and entertainers ==
- Paul Avgerinos (born 1957), musician and electronic music composer
- Leonard Bernstein (1918–1990), composer and conductor, lived on Fox Run Road in the 1950s
- Michael Ian Black (born 1971), actor, comedian and author
- Ritchie Blackmore (born 1945), musician, former resident
- John Byrum (born 1947), motion picture director, screenwriter, and producer, long-time resident of West Redding
- Diana Canova (born 1953), actress; spouse of Grammy Award-winning producer Elliott Scheiner
- Rachel Crothers (1979–1958), playwright and director
- Hume Cronyn (1911–2003), Academy Award-nominated actor, lived with his wife, Jessica Tandy, on Stepney Road in the 1940s and 1950s
- Morton DaCosta (1914–1989), director and producer of films and Broadway shows
- Daryl Hall (born 1946), musician with Hall & Oates, lived on Topstone Road
- Jascha Heifetz (1901–1987), violinist, lived on Sanfordtown Road in the 1940s
- Matt Hoverman (born 1968), actor, playwright
- Charles Ives (1874–1954), musician, composer
- Igor Kipnis (1930–2002), musician who died at his home in town
- Hope Lange (1933–2003), Emmy Award-winning, Oscar-nominated actress
- Jack Lawrence (1912–2009), composer inducted into the Songwriters Hall of Fame in 1975
- Barry Levinson (born 1942), Academy Award-winning film director
- Enoch Light (1905–1978), composer, musician, music label executive and sound technician
- Meat Loaf (1947–2022), rock singer, Joel Barlow High School softball coach during the 1990s
- Lori March Scourby (1923–2013), once known as the "first lady of daytime television" for her roles in soap operas
- Carmen Mathews (1911–1995), actress, environment and philanthropist; created New Pond Farm preserve and camp for disadvantaged children
- Fred Newman (born 1952), actor, voice actor, composer, and sound effects artist, current resident
- Colleen Zenk Pinter (born 1953), actress; spouse of Mark Pinter
- Mark Pinter (born 1950), actor; spouse of Colleen Zenk Pinter
- Derek Piotr (born 1991), composer and vocalist
- Andy Powell (born 1950), guitarist and only constant member of British progressive rock group Wishbone Ash, has lived in Redding since 1991
- Elliot Scheiner (born 1947), engineer and five-time Grammy Award-winning producer; spouse of actress Diana Canova
- Karen Kopins Shaw (born 1961), actress in films; winner of Miss Connecticut pageant in 1977
- Jessica Tandy (1909–1994), Academy Award-winning actress, lived with her husband, Hume Cronyn (1911–2003), on Stepney Road in the 1940s and 1950s
- Russ Titelman (born 1944), Grammy-winning record producer, lived in town in the 1980s
- Mary Travers (1936–2009), of the Peter, Paul and Mary group
- Guinevere Van Seenus (born 1977), model, photographer and jewelry designer
- Marcy Walker (born 1961), actress, lived in West Redding during the mid-1990s
- Maura West (born 1972), daytime Emmy Award-winning actress on As the World Turns
- Frank Whaley (born 1963), actor, director, and screenwriter who had roles in multiple films by Oliver Stone

== Authors and other writers ==
- Joel Barlow (1754–1812), poet and diplomat, born in Redding
- Julian Barry (born 1930), Oscar nominee for Lenny, resident since 2001
- Ann Beattie (born 1947), author of eight novels and short stories in The New Yorker and other publications
- Amy Ella Blanchard (1854–1926), writer
- Marcia Brown (1918–2015), children's book author and illustrator
- Stuart Chase (1988–1985), author credited with coining the slogan "A New Deal" for Franklin D. Roosevelt, lived in Redding from the 1930s until his death in 1985
- Les Daniels (1943–2011), author and noted historian on comic books
- Howard Fast (1914–2003), author, lived on Cross Highway in the 1980s
- Robert Fitzgerald (1910–1985), translator, poet, mentor of Flannery O'Connor, lived on Seventy Acre Road
- William Honan (1930–2014), Pulitzer Prize-nominated author
- Eliot Janeway (1913–1993), author and economist; spouse of Elizabeth Janeway and father of Michael Janeway
- Elizabeth Janeway (1913–2005), novelist, spouse of Eliot Janeway and father of Michael Janeway
- Michael Janeway (1940–2014), author and editor of The Boston Globe; son of Eliot and Elizabeth Janeway
- Holly Keller (born 1942), children's author and illustrator, lived in West Redding in the 1970s, 1980s, and 1990s
- Phyllis Krasilovsky (1926–2014), authored 20 books for children between 1950 and 1997
- Joseph Wood Krutch (1893–1970), author and naturalist, lived on Limekiln Road in the 1940s
- Flannery O'Connor (1925–1964), novelist, wrote Wise Blood while a boarder at the home of Robert Fitzgerald and family on Seventy Acre Road (from 1949 to 1951)
- Albert Bigelow Paine (1861–1937), writer, lived on Diamond Hill
- Jane and Michael Stern (both born 1946), of West Redding, write the "Roadfood" column for Gourmet magazine; authors of Roadfood and other books
- Ruth Stout (1884–1980), writer about organic gardening
- Anne Parrish Titzell (1888–1957), children's book author, lived on Peaceable Street
- Ada Josephine Todd (1858–1904), author and educator
- Alvin Toffler (1928–2016), author of Future Shock, lived on Mountain Road
- Aaron Louis Treadwell Ph.D. (1866–1947), college professor; author of The Cytogeny of Podarke obscura and other scientific books
- Tasha Tudor (1915–2008), children's author and artist, lived on Tudor Road
- Mark Twain (born Samuel Clemens) (1835–1910), lived in mansion dubbed "Stormfield" built on land located on present-day Mark Twain Lane from 1908 to 1910

== Artists, art experts and critics, cartoonists ==
- Dan Beard (1850–1941), illustrator and one of the founders of the Boy Scouts of America; lived on Great Pasture
- Rebecca Couch (1788–1863), painter
- Katherine Sophie Dreier (1877–1952), late artist and patron of the arts who helped found the Museum of Modern Art, lived on Marchant Road in 1912
- Hal Foster (1892–1982), Prince Valiant cartoonist
- Gill Fox (1915–2004), two-time Pulitzer Prize-nominated cartoonist
- Anna Hyatt Huntington (1876–1973), artist; with husband Archer Huntington, gave land to create Collis P. Huntington State Park
- Robert Natkin (1930–2010), abstract expressionist
- Edward Steichen (1879–1973), artist and photographer, lived on Topstone (Topstone Park was his property)
- Ida Waugh (1846–1919), illustrator

== People in government and politics ==
- Stephen Barlow (1779–1845), member of the U.S. House of Representatives from Pennsylvania 1827-29, born in Redding
- Dudley S. Gregory (1800–1874), member of the U.S. House of Representatives from New Jersey 1847-49, born in Redding
- Ebenezer J. Hill (1845–1917), Connecticut member of the United States House of Representatives from 1895 to 1913
- David Lilienthal (1899–1981), scientist and director of the U.S. Atomic Energy Commission and the Tennessee Valley Authority, lived on Stepney Road
- Dick Morris (born 1946), political consultant and author
- Walter White (1893–1955), former head (executive secretary) of NAACP, lived on Seventy Acres Road

== Other ==
- Adam D'Angelo, former CTO of Facebook, co-founder of Quora
- Wendell Garner (1921–2008), Yale University researcher who made significant contributions to the cognitive revolution, retired to Meadow Ridge
- Frank M. Hawks (1897–1938), aviator who made the fourth-ever nonstop coast-to-coast flight in the United States in 1929, lived in town
- Alfred Winslow Jones (1900–1989), hedge fund manager, lived on Poverty Hollow Road
- Alex Kroll, inductee of the College Football Hall of Fame and Advertising Hall of Fame, lived in town
- Lawrence Kudlow (born 1947), host of Kudlow and Company television program, current resident
- Gerald M. Loeb (1899–1974), author and founding partner of brokerage E.F. Hutton
- Lee MacPhail (1917–2012), former Major League Baseball commissioner and inductee to the National Baseball Hall of Fame
- Christopher McCormick, CEO of L.L. Bean
- Lauren S. McCready (1915–2007), a founder of the U.S. Merchant Marine Academy
- Charlie Morton (born 1983), Major League Baseball pitcher; raised in Redding, attended Joel Barlow High School
- Arthur D. Nicholson, United States Army officer shot and killed by a Soviet sentry in 1985, while conducting intelligence activities in East Germany
- Clementine Paddleford (1898–1967), author and food critic who coined the term "hero" for the submarine sandwich
- Major General Samuel Holden Parsons (1737–1789), commander in the Continental Army under Gen. Israel Putnam, later chief judge of the Northwest Territory, lived on Black Rock Turnpike
- Lucien M. Underwood (1853–1907), founding member of the New York Botanical Society
- Chickens Warrups, established a Native American village on land that eventually became part of Redding

== See also ==
- List of people from Connecticut
- List of people from Bridgeport, Connecticut
- List of people from Brookfield, Connecticut
- List of people from Darien, Connecticut
- List of people from Greenwich, Connecticut
- List of people from Hartford, Connecticut
- List of people from New Canaan, Connecticut
- List of people from New Haven, Connecticut
- List of people from Norwalk, Connecticut
- List of people from Ridgefield, Connecticut
- List of people from Stamford, Connecticut
- List of people from Westport, Connecticut
