= List of people from Bridgeport, Connecticut =

This is a list of notable people associated with Bridgeport, Connecticut who achieved great public distinction, listed in the category for which they are best known.

== Athletes ==
=== Baseball players ===
These baseball players were born in or lived in the city:

- Howard Baker, Major League baseball player
- Cornelius "Neal" Ball, credited with the first unassisted triple play in the major leagues
- George Bryant, MLB player for Detroit Wolverines
- George "Kiddo" Davis, who in the 1933 World Series against the Washington Senators had 7 hits in 19 at-bats, and batted .368, helping the New York Giants win the championship
- Rob Dibble, pitcher for Cincinnati Reds, Chicago White Sox, and Milwaukee Brewers
- Angel Echevarria, played in National League for Colorado Rockies, Milwaukee Brewers, and Chicago Cubs
- Ray Keating, pitched for the New York Highlanders, New York Yankees, and Boston Braves
- Kurt Kepshire, pitcher for the St. Louis Cardinals
- Charles Nagy, pitcher for Cleveland Indians and San Diego Padres, pitched in the 1995 and 1997 World Series
- Tricky Nichols, pitcher for the Boston Red Caps, St. Louis Brown Stockings, Providence Grays, Worcester Ruby Legs and Baltimore Orioles
- Jim O'Rourke, first player to be credited with a hit and single in a professional baseball game
- Ed Rowen, 19th-century baseball player for the Boston Red Caps and Philadelphia Athletics
- Dan Shannon, played second base for the Louisville Colonels and the Philadelphia Quakers, and second base and shortstop for the New York Giants and the Washington Senators
- Ed Wojna, pitcher for the San Diego Padres and Cleveland Indians

=== Basketball players ===
- Courtney Alexander, played three seasons in the NBA and is currently an assistant coach of the College Park Skyhawks of the NBA G League
- John Bagley, played for eleven seasons in the NBA
- Walter Luckett, star high school and college player in the 1970s
- Wes Matthews, played ten seasons in the NBA
- Frank Oleynick, played two years for NBA in Seattle
- Charles D. Smith, University of Pittsburgh and New York Knicks
- Chris Smith, University of Connecticut and Minnesota Timberwolves
- Harper Williams, basketball player

=== Football players ===
- Kevin Belcher, NFL player
- Keith Dudzinski, college football player and coach
- Tony Elliott, played six seasons in the NFL
- Nick Giaquinto, played four seasons in the NFL
- Ching Hammill, football player
- Mike L. Jones, NFL player for Minnesota Vikings, Indianapolis Colts and Seattle Seahawks
- Alex Joseph, pro football player

=== Soccer players ===
- Alyssa Naeher, goalkeeper for the Chicago Red Stars in the National Women's Soccer League (NWSL) and United States women's national soccer team (USWNT)

=== Hockey players ===
- Julie Chu, three-time Olympic ice hockey medalist

=== Tennis players ===
- Sidney Wood, tennis player, won at Wimbledon in 1931, reached Davis Cup finals in 1934

=== Boxers ===
- Jack Delaney, world light heavyweight boxing champion

== Business people ==
- Kenton Clarke, founder of Computer Consulting Associates International Inc.
- Fred DeLuca, founder of Subway
- George Gilman, founder of the Great Atlantic and Pacific Tea Company
- Edwin H. Land, founder of Polaroid Corporation
- James Murren (born 1961), banker
- Nathaniel Wheeler, manufacturer of Wheeler & Wilson; state legislator
- Vincent Zarrilli, founder of The Pot Shop

== Entertainers, artists, writers ==
- Emma Dunning Banks (1856–1931), actress, dramatic reader, teacher, and writer
- P.T. Barnum, circus owner, entrepreneur and mayor of Bridgeport
- Madeline Blair, prostitute and naval stowaway
- Robert O. Bowen, novelist
- Al Capp, cartoonist, creator of comic strip Li'l Abner
- Adriana Caselotti, voice of Snow White
- Adger Cowans, fine arts photographer and abstract painter
- Perry DeAngelis, co-founder and executive director of NESS, co-founder of The Skeptics' Guide to the Universe
- Sally Haley, artist and painter
- Maureen Howard, author
- Walt Kelly, cartoonist, creator of Pogo
- Larry Kramer, playwright and gay rights activist, writer of The Normal Heart
- Roy Neuberger, art collector and donor
- Charles Schnee, screenwriter and film producer
- Jim Shepard, author
- Cyndy Szekeres, children's book author and illustrator
- General Tom Thumb (Charles Stratton), performer, little person

=== Actors ===
- Richard Belzer, actor and comedian who once worked as a reporter for the Connecticut Post
- Alexandra Breckenridge, actress
- Adriana Caselotti, actress
- Bob Crane, actor known for his lead role in Hogan's Heroes; radio host on WICC-AM in Bridgeport, 1950–1955
- Brian Dennehy, actor
- John Forrest, actor
- Arline Judge, actress
- John Mitchum, actor
- Robert Mitchum, actor
- Tony Musante, actor
- Kevin Nealon, comedian and actor
- John Ratzenberger, actor known for role of Cliff Clavin in TV series Cheers
- Bill Smitrovich, actor
- Deborah Walley, actress
- Michael Jai White, actor

=== Musicians ===
- Art Baron, jazz trombonist
- Mimi Benzell, Metropolitan Opera soprano
- Joseph Celli, oboist
- Fanny Crosby, composer of more than 8,000 Christian hymns; lived here for the last fifteen years of her life; buried in the Mountain Grove Cemetery
- Vernon Dalhart, singer-songwriter
- Jessica Delfino, musician, comedian
- Jin Hi Kim, geomungo player and composer
- Deon Kipping, gospel singer
- Paul Leka, singer-songwriter, composer, member of band Steam, known for "Na Na Hey Hey Kiss Him Goodbye"
- Angus Maclise, experimental musician and poet, founding member of The Velvet Underground
- John Mayer, singer-songwriter, born in Bridgeport, largely grew up in neighboring Fairfield
- Peter McCann, singer-songwriter, "Do You Wanna Make Love", "Right Time of the Night"
- Syesha Mercado, singer, actress and American Idol contestant
- Justin Quiles, singer, songwriter
- Lou "Boulder" Richards, guitarist (Hatebreed)
- Vinnie Vincent, guitarist (KISS)

=== Musical groups ===
- The Alternate Routes (2002–present), rock band
- Hatebreed (1994–present), metallic hardcore band
- Last Common Ancestor (2018–present), punk grunge band
- The Skinny Boys, 1980s rap group
- Steam, late 1960s pop band
- The Stepkids (2009–present), psych soul band
- Youthful Praise (2001–present), gospel choir
- The Zambonis (1991–present), hockey rock

== Government service ==
- David H. Burr, cartographer
- Robert E. De Forest, mayor, congressman
- Paul Gottfried, former professor of Elizabethtown College
- Robert A. Hurley (1895–1968), Connecticut governor (first Roman Catholic to hold that office in Connecticut)
- Leonard Mastroni (1949–2020), Kansas state representative and judge
- Anita McBride, chief of staff to the First Lady of the United States, 2005–2009
- Jasper McLevy (1933–1957), mayor
- Margaret E. Morton (1924–2012), first African American woman to serve in the Connecticut General Assembly
- Mae Schmidle, Connecticut state representative
- William Shaler, U.S. consul in Mexico, Algiers and Havana
- James C. Shannon (1896–1980), Connecticut governor
- Christopher Shays, Fourth District congressman
- Samuel Simons (1792–1847), United States representative from Connecticut

== Inventors ==
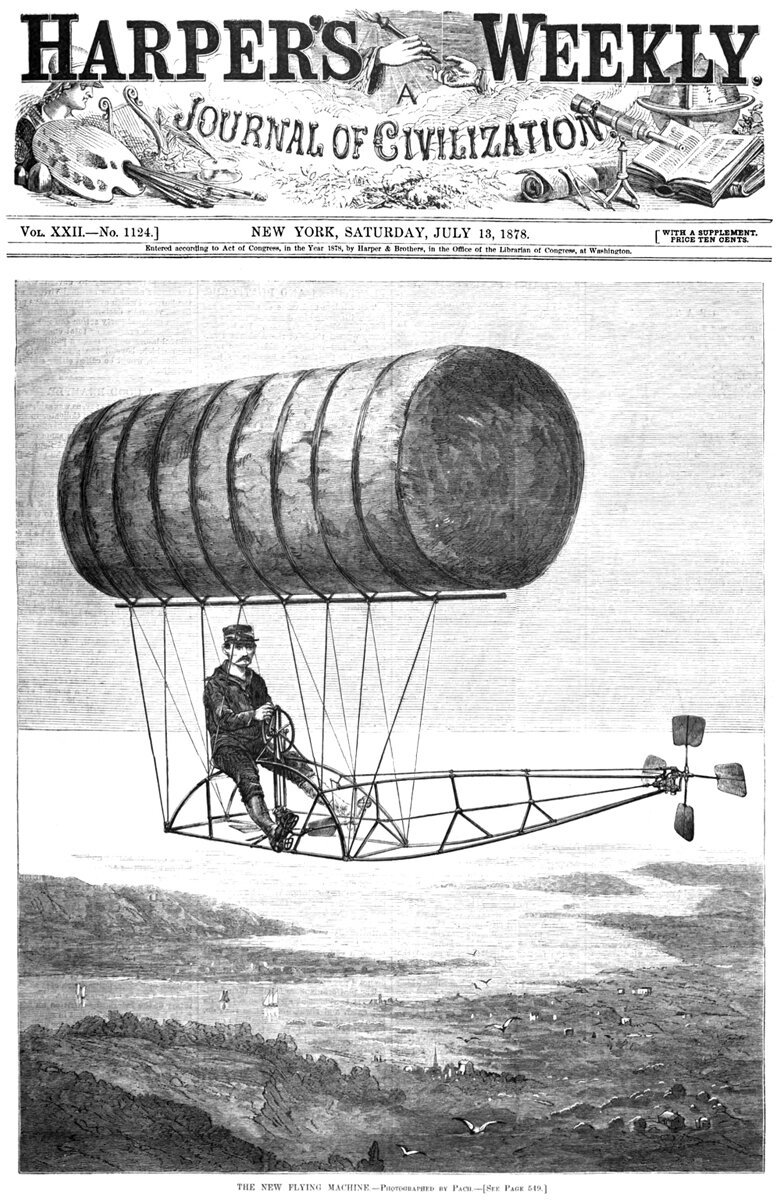
C.F. Ritchel of Bridgeport riding his dirigible, as seen on the July 15, 1878 cover of Harper's Weekly

- William Higinbotham, worked on the nuclear bomb, created one of the first video games Tennis for Two
- Harvey Hubbell, inventor of the electric plug and the pull-chain light socket
- Lewis Latimer, inventor
- Charles F. Ritchel, inventor
- Gustave Whitehead, inventor

== Medical ==
- Alfred Fones, dentist credited with founding the profession of dental hygiene in 1906
- Augustus Huggins Abernathy, obstetric physician and former member of the City Board of Health during 1870's.

== Military ==
- David Hawley, Naval commander and privateer during the American Revolution
- Raymond Jacobs, claimed to be in photo of first flag raised on Iwo Jima in World War II
- Henry A. Mucci, led the raid that rescued survivors of the Bataan Death March in World War II

== Religious ==
- Edward Egan, former Roman Catholic bishop of Bridgeport, later became the cardinal archbishop of New York

== Other ==
- Victoria Leigh Soto, born in Bridgeport, school teacher, victim of the Sandy Hook Elementary School shooting, died at age 27

== See also ==
- List of people from Connecticut
- List of people from Brookfield, Connecticut
- List of people from Darien, Connecticut
- List of people from Greenwich, Connecticut
- List of people from Hartford, Connecticut
- List of people from New Canaan, Connecticut
- List of people from New Haven, Connecticut
- List of people from Norwalk, Connecticut
- List of people from Redding, Connecticut
- List of people from Ridgefield, Connecticut
- List of people from Stamford, Connecticut
- List of people from Westport, Connecticut
