= List of people from Greenwich, Connecticut =

This is a list of people who have lived in or been associated with Greenwich, Connecticut now or in the past and are well known beyond the town.

They are listed based on the area in which person is best known (in alphabetical order within each category):

== Actors, directors, producers ==
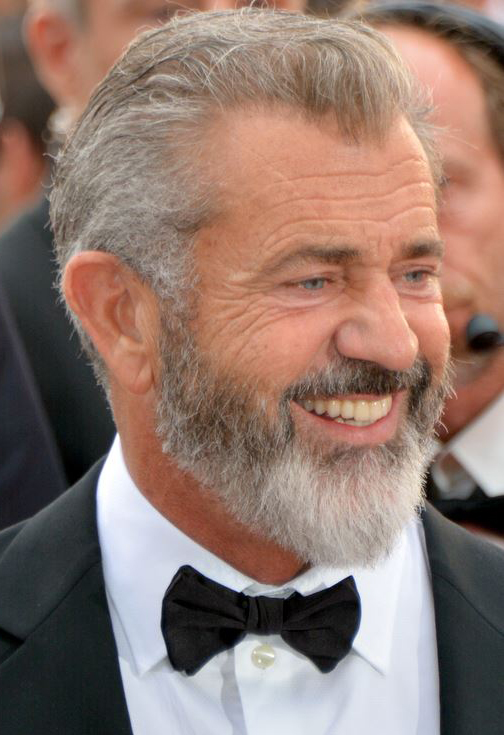
Mel Gibson, actor, director, and producer

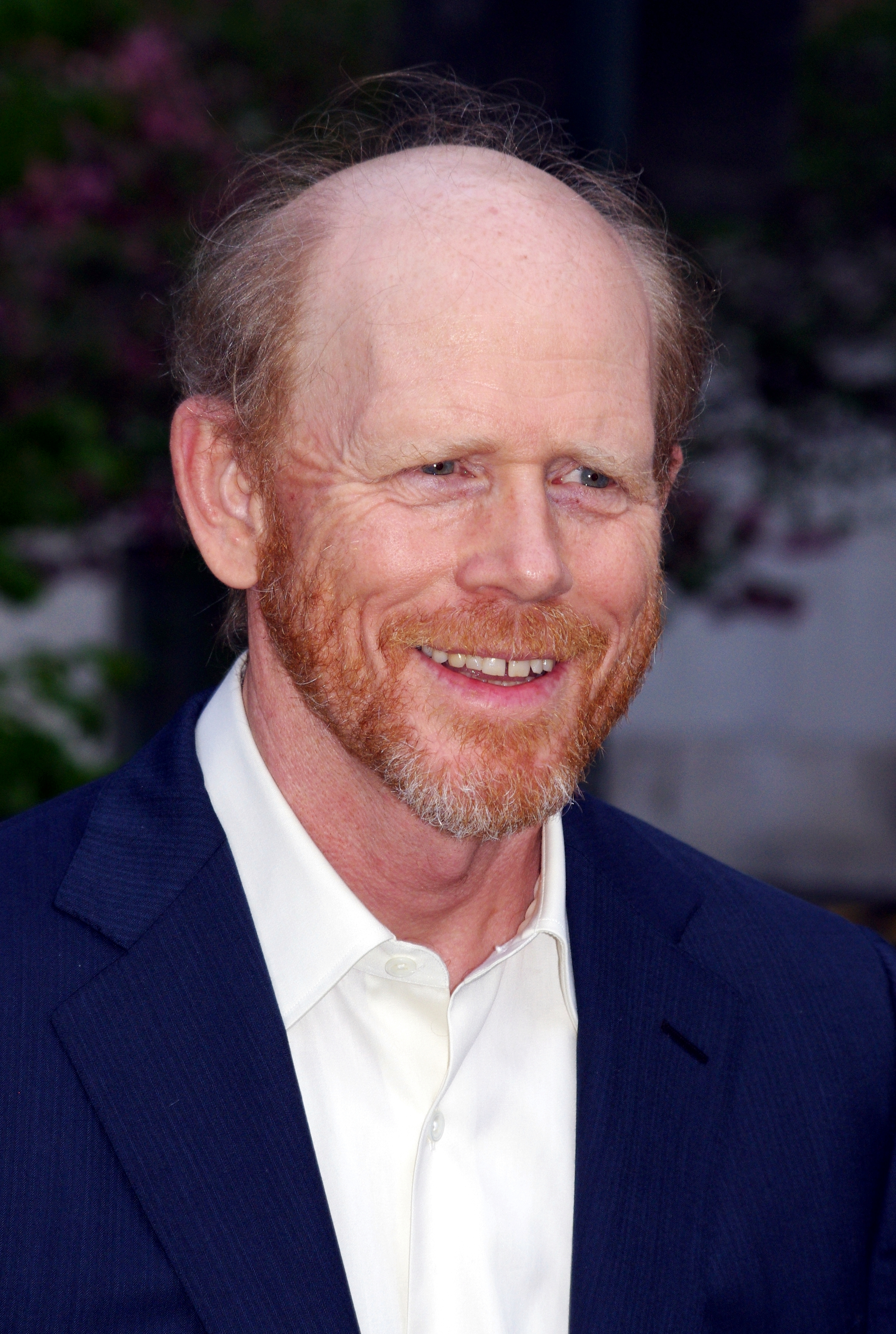
Ron Howard, actor, director, and producer

- Christopher Abbott, actor
- Bill Boggs, actor, author and journalist
- Scooter Braun, music producer and talent manager
- Glenn Close, actress
- Terry Crews, actor
- Gabriela Dias, actress, producer, writer, humanitarian
- Johnny Doran, actor
- Henry Fonda (1905–1982), actor
- Jane Fonda (born 1937), actress
- Peter Fonda (1940–2019), actor
- Mel Gibson (born 1956), actor, director, producer
- Shelley Hack (born 1947), actress
- Bob Haymes (1923–1989), actor and composer
- Bryce Dallas Howard (born 1981), actress; daughter of filmmaker Ron Howard
- Ron Howard (born 1954), actor and director
- Leatrice Joy (1893–1985), silent film actress
- Tom Kuntz (born 1972), commercial and music video director
- Joseph E. Levine (1905–1987), film producer and distributor
- Rod Lurie (born 1962), director and screenwriter
- Mary Tyler Moore (1936–2017), actress
- Bert Parks (1914–1992), actor, television personality
- Bijou Phillips (born 1980), actress, singer and model
- Linda Purl (born 1955), actress and singer
- Elisabeth Röhm (born 1973), actress
- Kelly Rohrbach (born 1990), model and actress
- Madeleine Sackler (born 1983), director, producer, and editor
- Rick Schroder (born 1970), actor
- George C. Scott (1927–1999), actor
- Zack Snyder (born 1966), film director
- Heather Thomas (born 1957), actress and screenwriter
- Dyanne Thorne (1936–2020), actress, model and ordained minister
- Justin Zackham, director and screenwriter; writer of The Bucket List
- Hasan Minhaj, comedian, writer, producer, political commentator, actor, and television host

== Musicians, models, other entertainers ==
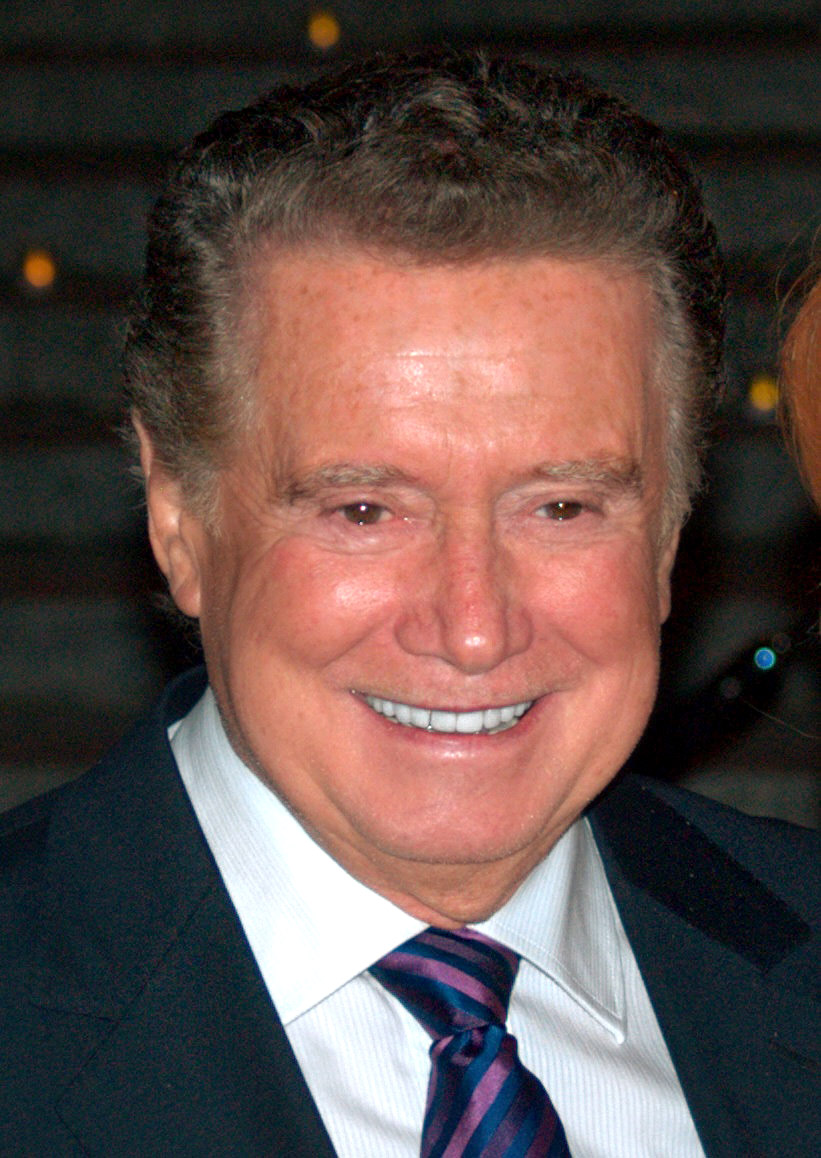
Regis Philbin, TV host

- Tom Bergeron, host of America's Funniest Home Videos and Dancing With the Stars
- Victor Borge (1909–2000), pianist and comedian
- A. Whitney Brown, writer and comedian
- Eugenia Cooney, YouTuber and influencer
- Alice Cooper, singer-songwriter and actor
- Wilhelmina Cooper (1940–1980), supermodel
- Gary Dell'Abate (born 1961), radio personality known as "Baba Booey"; producer at The Howard Stern Show
- Tommy Dorsey (1905–1956), trombonist and bandleader in the Big Band era
- Clyde Fitch (1865–1909), dramatist
- Stephan Galfas, Grammy Award-nominated record producer
- Kathie Lee Gifford, television personality, wife of the late Frank Gifford
- Cynthia Gregory, prima ballerina
- Bob Haymes (1923–1989), actor and composer
- Ray Henderson (1896–1970), songwriter
- Jim Henson (1936–1990), puppeteer, animator, cartoonist, actor, inventor, composer, and screenwriter
- Erich Kunzel (1935–2009), conductor of the Cincinnati Pops Orchestra
- Rodney Leinhardt (born 1970), professional wrestler
- Jana Mashonee, Native American singer-songwriter
- Michael Matijevic, lead singer of Steelheart
- Stefano Miceli (born 1975), conductor and pianist
- Tom Noonan (born 1951), actor, director, playwright
- Jack Paar (1918–2004), host of The Tonight Show
- Regis Philbin (1931–2020), television personality
- Caroline Polachek, singer
- Francesca Roberto, operatic soprano
- Diana Ross, singer and actress
- Stephanie Seymour, model; wife of Peter M. Brant, publishing mogul
- Judy Sheindlin, television personality and producer
- Sean Smith (born 1965), modern jazz double bass player
- Hana Soukupova, model; wife of Drew Aaron, paper magnate and entrepreneur; restored Greenwich's North Court estate
- Montel Williams, television personality

== Sports ==
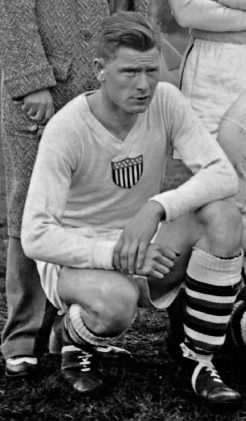
Jim Brown at the 1st FIFA World Cup in 1930

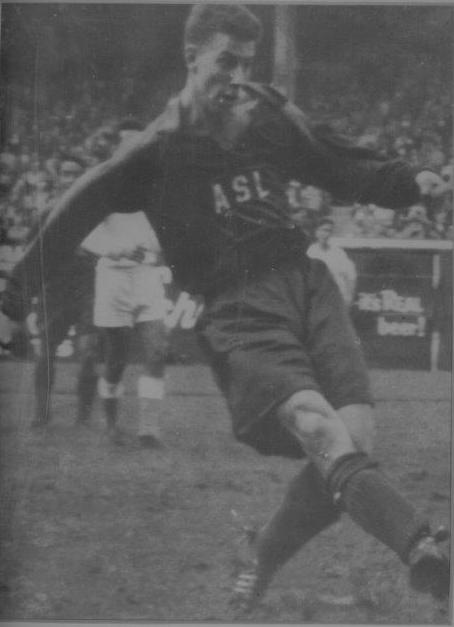
George Brown, ASL All-Star

- Ken Bell, NFL player
- Rolando Blackman, NBA player
- William Blumberg (born 1998), tennis player
- Bobby Bonilla (born 1963), MLB player
- Aaron Boone, MLB player and manager
- George Brown (born 1935), soccer player, coach, and National Soccer Hall of Fame inductee
- Jim Brown (1908–1994), soccer player and coach
- Glenn Caruso (born 1974), football player and coach
- Chris Cleary (born 1979), professional soccer player
- Casey Close (born 1963), MLB player, sports agent, husband of Gretchen Carlson
- Gerrit Cole (born 1990), MLB player
- David Cone, MLB player
- Carlos Delgado, New York Mets first baseman
- Tony DeLuca (1960–1999), NFL player
- George Foster (born 1948), MLB player
- Doug Friedman, professional ice hockey player
- Frank Gifford (1930–2015), NFL player, sportscaster; husband of Kathie Lee Gifford
- Joe Girardi, manager of the New York Yankees
- Gail Goodrich (born 1943), basketball player; studio analyst for NBA TV
- Dorothy Hamill, Olympic figure-skating gold medalist
- Allan Houston (born 1971), NBA player
- Andres Jasson,(born 2002) American professional soccer player
- Cornelius Johnson (wide receiver), American football player, Division 1 Wide Receiver
- Mike Keenan, professional ice hockey coach
- Ralph Kiner (1922–2014), Baseball Hall of Famer and broadcaster
- Alexei Kovalev, NHL player
- Pat LaFontaine, NHL player
- Ivan Lendl, tennis player
- Skip Lockwood (born 1946), MLB pitcher
- Dave Maloney, hockey player and radio commentator
- Pedro Martínez, MLB player
- Lee Mazzilli, MLB player and coach
- Shane McMahon, former World Wrestling Entertainment wrestler and executive, son of Vince and Linda McMahon
- John F. Merchant (1933–2020), lawyer, activist, golfer and politician; first Black member of the USGA Executive Committee and former lawyer for Tiger Woods and Eldrick Woods
- Donovan Mitchell, NBA player for the Cleveland Cavaliers
- Markus Näslund, retired NHL player
- Ahmad Rashad, NFL player
- Helen Resor (born 1985), ice hockey player; 2006 Winter Olympics bronze medalist
- Mike Richter, NHL Stanley Cup-winning goalie
- Martin St. Louis, NHL player
- David Sayler, Athletic Director at Miami University
- Tom Seaver (1944–2020), Cy Young Award-winning pitcher and Baseball Hall of Fame inductee
- Kevin Shattenkirk (born 1989), professional ice hockey player
- John Sullivan, NFL player
- Craig Swan (born 1950), MLB pitcher
- Mark Teixeira, MLB player for New York Yankees
- Tim Teufel (born 1958), MLB player
- Donna de Varona (born 1947), Olympic gold medalist in swimming; sportscaster
- Fay Vincent (1938–2025), commissioner of baseball (1989–1992)
- Billy Wagner, MLB pitcher
- Alister Walker, professional squash player
- Mats Wilander (born 1964), tennis player
- Colin Wilson (born 1989), hockey player
- Steve Young (born 1961), NFL player
- Shahid Zaman, professional squash player

== Authors, writers ==
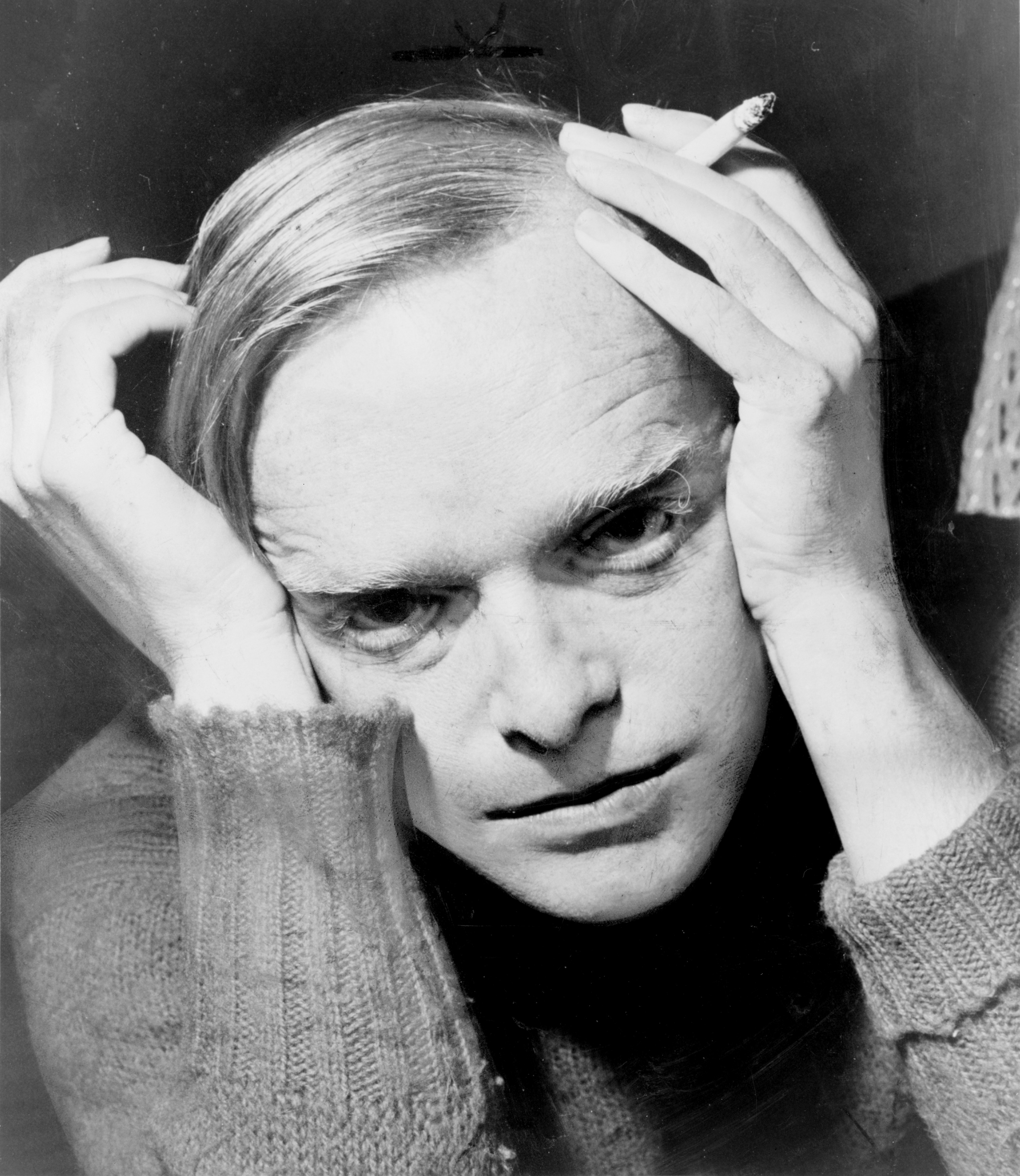
Truman Capote in 1959

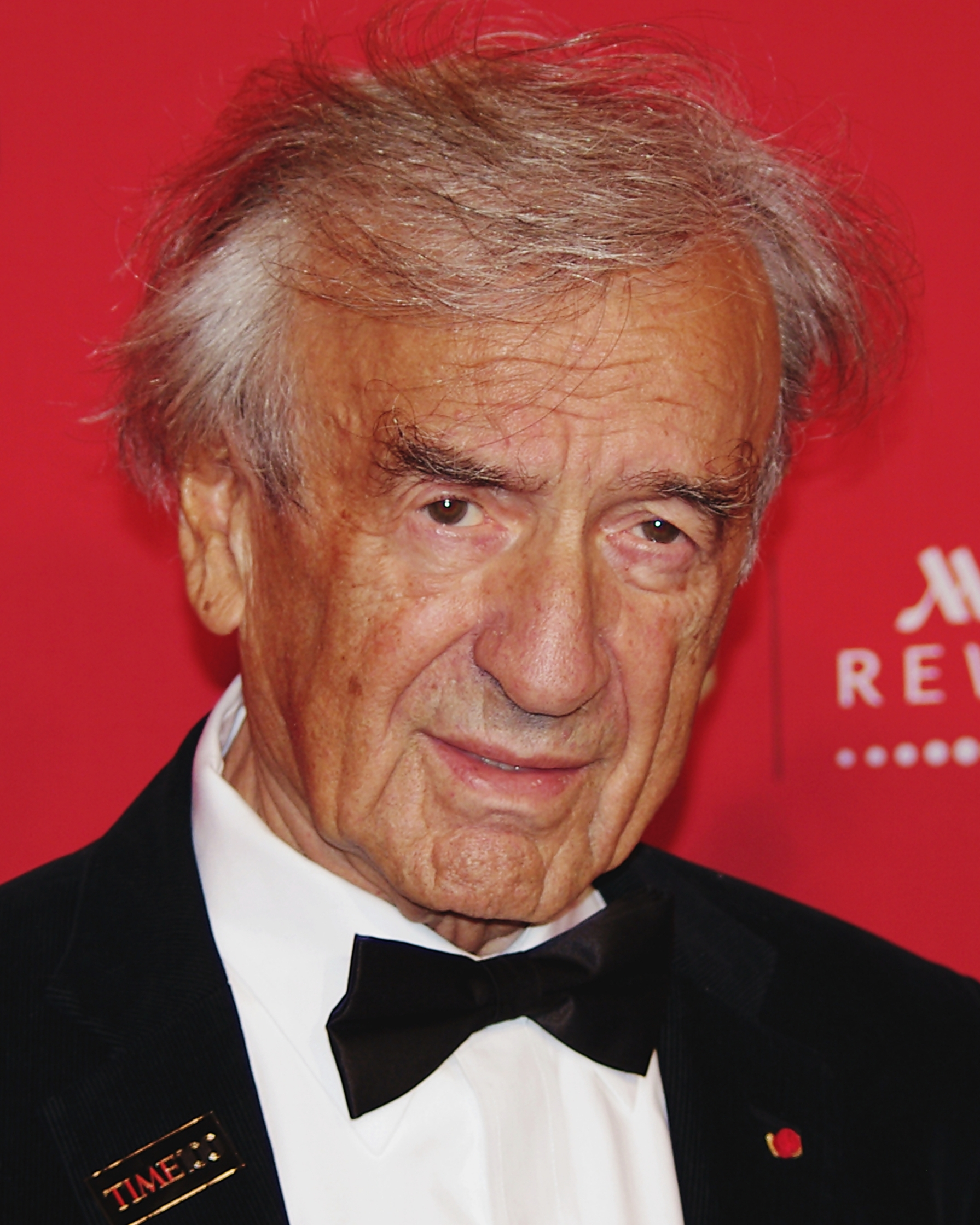
Elie Wiesel in 2012

- Taylor Caldwell (1900–1985), British-born American novelist
- Truman Capote (1924–1984), writer
- Caroline B. Cooney (born 1947), horror and mystery author
- A. J. Cronin (1896–1981), Scottish author
- Frederick Exley (1929–1992), author
- Howard Fast (1914–2003), author; had an editorial column in The Greenwich Time
- Jonathan Fast (born 1948), author and social work educator
- James F. Fixx (1932–1984), author
- Thomas Flanagan (1923–2002), writer, university professor
- Carl Higbie (born 1983), decorated Navy SEAL and author
- John Jakes (1932–2023), novelist
- D. J. Machale (born 1955), author of the Pendragon series
- Courtney Maum, author and book coach
- R. A. Montgomery (1936–2014), author
- Evan Osnos (born 1976), journalist and author
- Lawrence Riley (1896–1974), playwright and screenwriter
- Mark Salzman (born 1959), author
- Anya Seton (1904–1990), author of historical romances
- Barbara W. Tuchman (1912–1989), non-fiction author
- Elie Wiesel (1928–2016), Romanian-born American writer, professor, political activist, Nobel Peace Prize laureate, and Holocaust survivor

== Artists, architects, designers, cartoonists ==
- Phoebe Adams (born 1953), painter and sculptor; born in Greenwich
- Robert Denning (1927–2005), interior designer
- Tony DiPreta (1921–2010), comic book and comic strip artist
- Edgar de Evia (1910–2003), photographer, artist and author
- Steve Giovinco (born 1961), photographer
- Tommy Hilfiger (born 1951), fashion designer
- Bai Ji Kong (1932–2018), contemporary painter originally from China
- Ranan Lurie (born 1932), editorial cartoonist and journalist
- Elmer Livingston MacRae (1875–1953), artist
- Robert Motherwell (1915–1991), abstract expressionist
- John Cullen Murphy (1919–2004), comic artist
- Leonard Ochtman (1854–1935), his wife Mina Fonda Ochtman (1862–1924), artists and part of the Cos Cob Art Colony
- Edward Clark Potter (1857–1923), sculptor, designed the lions in front of the New York Public Library
- John von Bergen (born 1971), sculptor
- Mort Walker (1923–2018), cartoonist; creator of Beetle Bailey

== Government ==
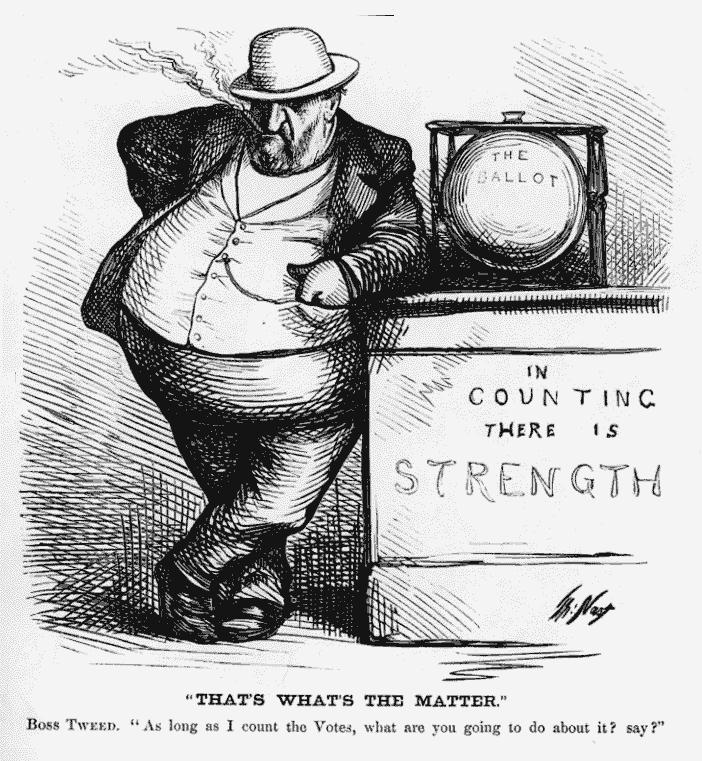
Expert vote-counter Boss Tweed, by Thomas Nast

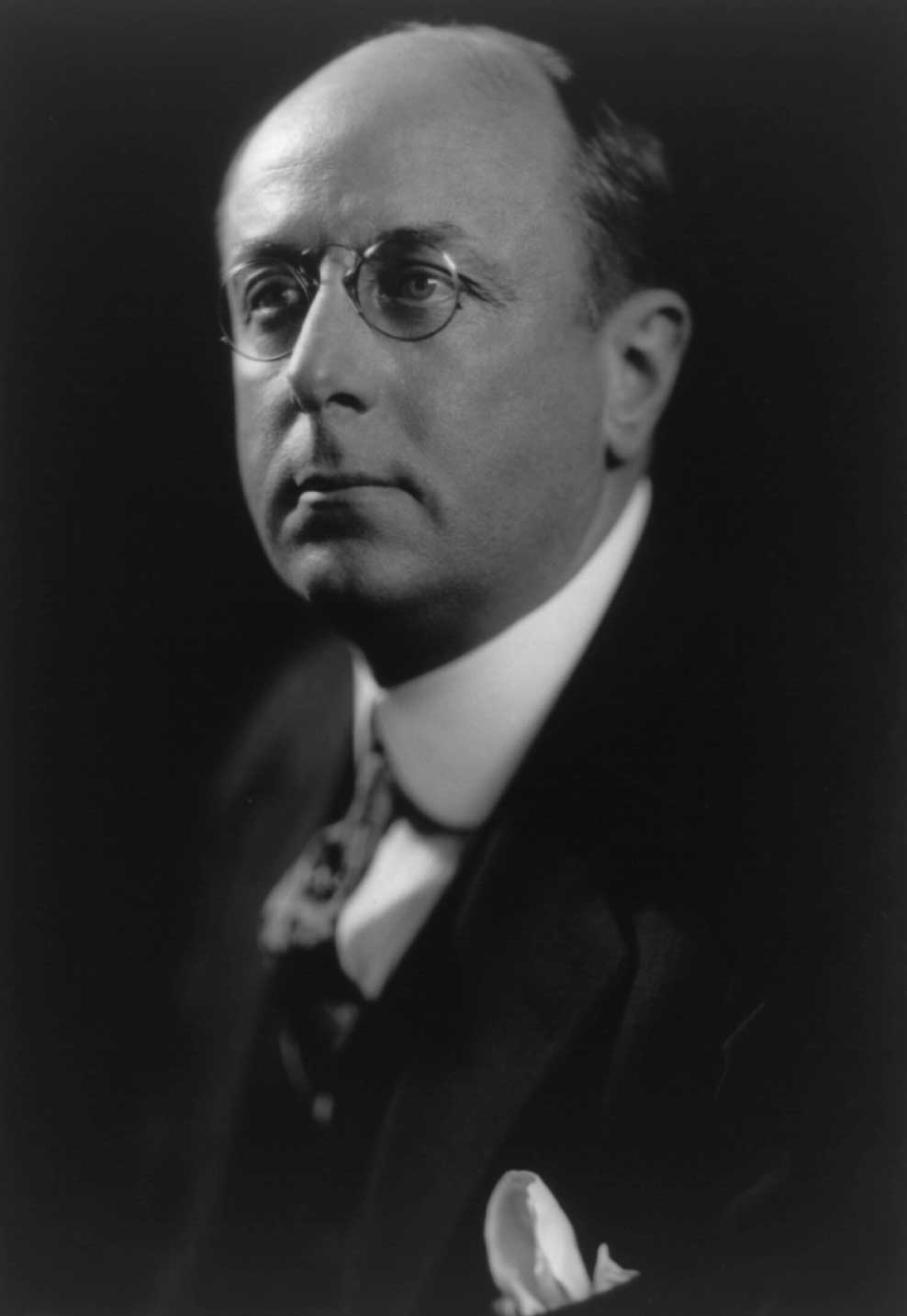
Homer Stille Cummings

- Richard Blumenthal, U.S. Senator, state Attorney General
- George H. W. Bush (1924–2018), 41st President of the United States
- George W. Bush, 43rd President of the United States
- Prescott Bush (1895–1972), U.S. Senator; father of George H.W. Bush
- Chris Coons (born 1963), U.S. senator for Delaware
- Homer Stille Cummings (1870–1956), U.S. Attorney General, 1933–1939 and Stamford mayor
- Florence Finney (1903–1994), first woman to serve as president pro tempore of the Connecticut State Senate
- Russell Benjamin Harrison (1854–1936), diplomat, member of the Indiana House of Representatives and Indiana Senate, son of President Benjamin Harrison and Caroline Harrison, great-grandson of President and Major General William Henry Harrison, father of U.S. Representative William Henry Harrison II
- Hope Hicks (born 1988), White House Director of Strategic Communications
- Jim Himes, U.S. Representative for Connecticut's 4th congressional district
- Ned Lamont, 89th Governor of Connecticut
- Samuel A. Lewis (1831–1913), politician and philanthropist
- Clare Boothe Luce (1903–1987), congresswoman, ambassador, playwright
- Mary Harrison McKee (1858–1930), daughter of President Benjamin Harrison and Caroline Harrison, great-granddaughter of President and Major General William Henry Harrison, Acting First Lady of the United States 1892–1893
- Michael L. Morano (1915–2000), businessman and politician
- Jennifer Psaki, Assistant to the President of the United States and the White House Communications Director
- Craig Roberts Stapleton, U.S. ambassador
- David Stockman, director of the Office of Management and Budget
- Kathleen Kennedy Townsend, member of the Kennedy political family; Lt. Governor of Maryland
- William M. "Boss" Tweed (1823–1878), famously corrupt New York City official
- Thomas Watson Jr. (1914–1993), IBM President and 16th United States Ambassador to the Soviet Union
- Lowell P. Weicker Jr. (born 1931), Connecticut Governor, U.S. Senator and U.S. Representative

== Judges, lawyers ==
- Roy Cohn (1927–1986), lawyer made famous as an aide to U.S. Senator Joseph McCarthy
- Lebbeus R. Wilfley (1866–1926), Attorney-General of the Philippines and Judge of the United States Court for China

== Business ==
- Warren Anderson (1921–2014), chairman of Union Carbide and CEO at the time of the Bhopal disaster
- Mary Anselmo (1929–2013), wife of billionaire Reynold "Rene" Anselmo
- Reynold "Rene" Anselmo (1926–1995), founder of PanAmSat
- Paul V. Applegarth, CEO of Millennium Challenge Corporation and executive of World Bank, Bank of America, and American Express
- Richard Attias, Moroccan events producer with his spouse, Cécilia
- Donald J. Bainton (1931–2010), Chairman and CEO of Continental Can Company, Knight of Malta
- Joseph Beninati, real estate developer and private equity investor
- Barton Biggs (1932–2012), money manager
- Steven Black, co-CEO of the Investment Bank at JP Morgan Chase & Co.
- Peter M. Brant, publisher, founder of the Greenwich Polo Club, husband of model Stephanie Seymour
- Richard C. Breeden, chairman of the U.S. Securities and Exchange Commission
- Steven A. Cohen, runs Point72 Asset Management in Stamford, and majority owner of the New York Mets
- Ray Dalio (born 1949), CEO of Bridgewater Associates of Westport
- Robert Diamond (born 1951), banker, President and CEO for investment banking at Barclays
- Brady Dougan (born 1959), CEO of Credit Suisse First Boston; CEO of Credit Suisse Group in Zurich
- Börje Ekholm, CEO of Ericsson
- Gerard Finneran, investment banker arrested after 1995 air rage incident
- Martin Frankel (born 1954), financier
- Richard S. Fuld Jr., CEO of Lehman Brothers Holdings Inc.
- Louis V. Gerstner Jr. (1942–2025), CEO of IBM
- Vladimir Gusinsky, Russian media baron
- Leona Helmsley (1920–2007), hotel owner
- Joseph Hirshhorn (1899–1981), mining tycoon and namesake of the Hirshhorn Museum and Sculpture Garden on the Mall in Washington, D.C.
- Paul Tudor Jones, runs Tudor Investments and lives in the Belle Haven section of town
- Robin Bennett Kanarek, nurse, philanthropist, and author
- Mel Karmazin, CEO of Sirius Satellite Radio
- Raymond Kassar (1928–2017), chairman and CEO of Atari
- Donald M. Kendall (1921–2020), CEO of PepsiCo
- Edward Lampert, head of ESL Investments
- George Lauder (1837–1924), Scottish-American billionaire industrialist, partner in the Carnegie Steel Company, board member of U.S. Steel, owned the Lauder Greenway Estate
- Paul "Triple H" Levesque, former World Wrestling Entertainment professional wrestler, CCO, chairman and head of creative for World Wrestling Entertainment, husband of Stephanie McMahon
- Andrew Madoff (1966–2014), financier and son of Bernie Madoff,
- Mark Madoff (1964–2010), financier and son of Bernie Madoff
- William F. May (1915–2011), chemical engineer; CEO of the American Can Company; co-founded the Film Society of Lincoln Center
- Charles Peter McColough (1922–2006), Chairman and CEO of Xerox
- Henry McKinnell (born 1943), CEO and chairman of the board of Pfizer Inc.
- Linda McMahon, co-founder of World Wrestling Entertainment with husband Vince McMahon
- Stephanie McMahon, World Wrestling Entertainment chairwoman and co-CEO, daughter of Vince and Linda McMahon
- Vince McMahon, World Wrestling Entertainment founder, former chairman and CEO, husband of Linda McMahon
- John Meriwether (born 1947), founder and CEO of JM Advisors Management
- Robert Hiester Montgomery (1872–1953), accountant and donor of 102-acre Montgomery Pinetum Park
- Indra Nooyi, CEO of PepsiCo
- Thomas Peterffy (born 1944), founder and chairman of Interactive Brokers
- Raymond Sackler (1920–2017), co-founder of Purdue Pharma
- Alan Schwartz, CEO of Bear Stearns
- Daniel Scotto (1952–2018), director of research at Bear Stearns, DLJ, L.F. Rothschild and S&P, institutional investor
- John Sculley, president of PepsiCo; CEO of Apple
- Christopher A. Sinclair, chairman and CEO of Mattel; CEO of PepsiCo
- Chip Skowron, hedge fund portfolio manager convicted of insider trading
- Barry Sternlicht, founder of Starwood Capital Group
- Edward Vick, CEO of Young & Rubicam
- Sanford I. Weill, banker, financier, formerly chief executive officer and chairman of Citigroup
- John Weinberg (1925–2006), CEO of Goldman Sachs
- Elisha Wiesel (born 1972), businessman, hedge fund manager, social activist, and philanthropist
- Cameron Winklevoss, Bitcoin investors and owners of Gemini cryptocurrency exchange headquartered in New York City; twin brother of Tyler
- Tyler Winklevoss, twin brother of Cameron; partner in Gemini and Bitcoin related ventures
- John Zimmer (born 1984), co-founder and president of Lyft

== Journalists, sportscasters ==
- Chris Berman (born 1955), host and anchor of various ESPN television programs
- Gretchen Carlson, television news personality, wife of Casey Close
- Charles C. W. Cooke, editor of National Review Online
- Rita Cosby (born 1964), television news personality
- Bill Evans, former WABC-TV weatherman
- Dan Hicks, NBC sportscaster
- Michael Kay (born 1961), television play-by-play broadcaster of the New York Yankees and ESPN sportscaster
- Matt Lauer, Today Show television host
- Louis Rukeyser (1933–2006), business columnist, economic commentator, and television personality
- Lara Spencer, co-host of ABC's Good Morning America; host of Antiques Roadshow
- Hannah Storm, ESPN sportscaster and host of CBS television's The Early Show
- Trey Wingo, ESPN sportscaster
- Warner Wolf, television and radio sportscaster

== Other ==
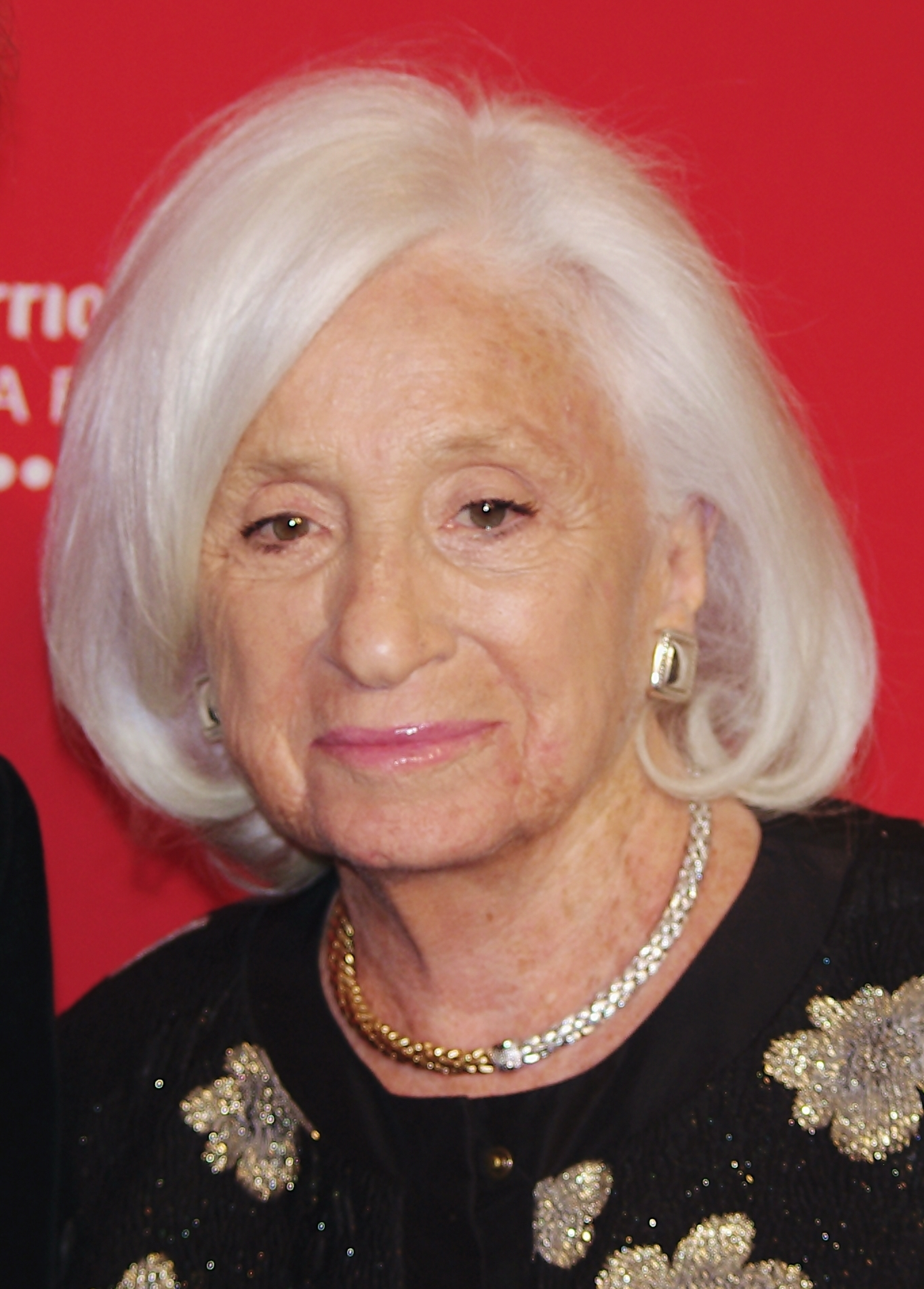
Marion Wiesel

- Carolyn Bessette-Kennedy (1966–1999), wife of John F. Kennedy Jr.
- Colonel Raynal Bolling (1877–1918), Pre-War Bolling was an esteemed New York Lawyer and General Counsel for US Steel during President Teddy Roosevelt's battle against Corporate Anti-Trusts, one of the founding fathers of American Air Power, first U.S. Army Officer and highest ranking American aviator to be killed in combat in World War I
- Blackleach Burritt (1744–1794), noted clergyman during the American Revolution
- Douglas Campbell (1896–1990), first American World War I aviator flying in an American unit to achieve the status of ace
- Michael Fossel (born 1950), professor of clinical medicine at Michigan State University
- Bill Gold (1921–2018), graphic designer
- G. Lauder Greenway (1904–1981), Chairman of the Metropolitan Opera Association; patron of the arts
- James Greenway (1903–1989), curator, Museum of Comparative Zoology, ornithologist, Lt. Commander U.S. Navy
- Henry U. Harder (born 1965), Adjutant General of Vermont
- Kara Hultgreen (1965–1994), lieutenant in the U.S. Navy; first female naval carrier-based fighter pilot
- Ethel Kennedy (1928 - 2014), human rights activist and wife of Robert F. Kennedy
- Barry Klarberg (born 1961), manager for athletes and entertainers
- Martha Moxley (1960–1975), high-profile murder victim
- Farah Pahlavi, Iranian empress
- Katherine E. Price (1864–1951), philanthropist and Papal countess
- Hubert Scott-Paine (1891–1954), British-American aircraft and boat designer, including PT boats
- Ernest Thompson Seton (1860–1946), author, helped found the Boy Scouts of America
- Mickey Sherman, criminal-defense attorney
- Polly Lauder Tunney (1907–2008), philanthropist, wife of World Heavyweight Champion Gene Tunney
- Cornelius Wendell Wickersham (1885–1968), U.S. Army officer, lawyer, and author
- Marion Wiesel (1931–2025), Austrian-American Holocaust survivor, humanitarian, and translator

== See also ==
- List of people from Connecticut
- List of people from Bridgeport, Connecticut
- List of people from Brookfield, Connecticut
- List of people from Darien, Connecticut
- List of people from Hartford, Connecticut
- List of people from New Canaan, Connecticut
- List of people from New Haven, Connecticut
- List of people from Norwalk, Connecticut
- List of people from Redding, Connecticut
- List of people from Stamford, Connecticut
- List of people from Westport, Connecticut
