= List of people from Darien, Connecticut =

This list of people from Darien, Connecticut, includes current and past residents as well as others associated with Darien, Connecticut. The list is categorized by area in which each person is best known, in alphabetical order within each category:

== Actors, musicians, and others in entertainment ==
- Kate Bosworth, actress, starred as Lois Lane in film Superman Returns and as Sandra Dee in biopic Beyond the Sea
- Eddie Bracken, film, Broadway, television and radio star with two stars on the Hollywood Walk of Fame
- Alexandra Breckenridge, actress
- Rose Marie Brown, actress and Miss Virginia (1939)
- Garrett Brown, film and TV actor, appeared in Uncle Buck, The O.C., Cold Case, CSI, The Practice and The Shield
- Eliza Clark, child actress in films and soap operas, grew up in town (sister of Spencer Treat Clark)
- Spencer Treat Clark (born 1987), child actor in films such as Gladiator and Mystic River, grew up in town (brother of Eliza Clark)
- Clint Conley, musician in the band Mission of Burma
- Kathleen Delaney, voice actress, best known for voicing Rouge the Bat in the Sonic the Hedgehog franchise from 2003-2009.
- Tom Gammill, Emmy-winning television producer and writer of The Simpsons, Monk, Seinfeld, Futurama, It's Garry Shandling's Show, Late Night with David Letterman, Saturday Night Live
- Topher Grace, actor, star of TV series That '70s Show and films such as Interstellar and Spider-Man 3
- Frank La Forge, pianist and composer
- Frank Latimore, actor, star of 1940s films such as 13 Rue Madeleine and Shock
- Garett Maggart, actor
- Alex Michel, cast member on The Bachelor
- Moby, musician, grew up partly in Darien
- Gerry Mulligan, Grammy Award-winning jazz musician and film music composer; died in Darien
- Christopher Plummer, Oscar-winning actor, former resident
- Chris Risola, American musician and songwriter. He is best known as the original lead guitarist for the glam metal band Steelheart
- Chloë Sevigny, Oscar-nominated, Golden Globe award-winning actress
- Steve-O, comedian; lived in Darien during his early years
- Mark Tinker, multiple Emmy-winning television producer/director, St. Elsewhere, The White Shadow, NYPD Blue, Deadwood, John From Cincinnati
- Gus Van Sant, director of films such as Good Will Hunting and Milk, attended Darien High School
- Steve Wilkos, host of television's Steve Wilkos Show, resident
- Paul Yates, artist, film director, born and raised in Darien
- Matthew Porretta, television, film, and voice actor known his role as the voice of the titular character of Alan Wake, and Alan Wake 2.
- Arca, Electronic music producer, moved to Darien when she was 3.

== Authors, writers, journalists, photojournalists ==
- Margaret Bourke-White, late photojournalist, lived in town first with author Erskine Caldwell, then in the same home on Point O'Woods South after their divorce
- Erskine Caldwell, late author, lived in town with Margaret Bourke-White, left her the house when they divorced
- Anne Morrow Lindbergh, late author, wife of Charles Lindbergh
- Rob Morrison, former anchor of CBS 2 News This Morning and CBS 2 News At Noon, resident
- Robert Newton Peck, author (now lives in Florida)
- Scott Pelley, 60 Minutes correspondent and anchor of the CBS Evening News, resident
- Joanna Scott, novelist, grew up in town
- Louise Hall Tharp, biographer

== Government, military ==
- Ethan Allen Brown (1776–1852), Ohio governor, U.S. Senator, diplomat, was born on the Fourth of July in town
- Leslie Groves, military head of the Manhattan Project, afterward lived in town
- Stephen Mather, founder and first director of the National Park Service
- Martha Peterson, former operations officer of the United States Central Intelligence Agency
- Christopher Shays, Republican congressman representing Connecticut's Fourth District, born in Darien and a 1964 graduate of Darien High School (now lives in the DC area)
- Ralph E. Van Norstrand (1961), minority leader of the Connecticut General Assembly, 1979—1985; Speaker of the Connecticut House of Representatives, 1985—1987

== Business ==
- Glenn Britt (1949–2014), former CEO of Time Warner
- Andrew Carnegie, steel magnate and philanthropist, vacationed for several summers at what became the Convent of the Sacred Heart on Long Neck
- Richard Chilton, billionaire, founder, chairman, and CEO of Chilton Investment Company
- Andreas Halvorsen, billionaire, CEO and co-founder of Viking Global Investors
- James B. Lee, Jr. (1952–2015), investment banker, former Vice Chairman of JPMorgan Chase & Co.
- Harold McGraw III, chairman, president and CEO of McGraw-Hill book publishing company, chairman (as of 2006) of the Business Roundtable, an association of CEOs of "leading" U.S. companies
- Walter E. Sachs (1884–1980), partner at Goldman, Sachs & Co.
- Peter Schiff, founder of Euro Pacific capital, former economic advisor to Texas Congressman Ron Paul's 2008 bid for the presidency
- Dennis Weatherstone, banker with J.P. Morgan & Co., moved to the area in 1971.

== Sports ==
- Brian Cashman, New York Yankees General Manager
- James Ignatowich (born 2000), professional pickleball player
- Hugh Jessiman (born 1984), professional hockey player
- Spencer Knight (born 2001), ice hockey goaltender
- Eddie Lopat (1918–1992), Major League Baseball pitcher, lived elsewhere, died at the home of his son in town
- Scott Morrow (b.2002), professional hockey player
- Michael Schwartz, Connecticut Boxing Hall of Fame
- Ryan Shannon, NHL player for Ottawa Senators, traded from Anaheim Ducks after they won the Stanley Cup in 2007
- Emmet Sheehan (born 1999), MLB pitcher for the Los Angeles Dodgers

== Artists ==
- Vincent Colyer (1825–1888), artist and humanitarian, lived on Contentment Island
- Gus Edson (1901–1966), cartoonist who drew The Gumps and Dondi
- Helen Frankenthaler (1928–2011), prominent second-generation abstract expressionist
- Lurelle Guild (1898–1985), industrial designer
- Walt Kelly (1913–1973), cartoonist who drew Pogo
- John Frederick Kensett (1816–1872), luminist, second generation Hudson River School; lived on Contentment Island
- Ruth Ray (1919–1977), artist who painted in a magical realist style

== Others ==
- Alex Kelly, convicted rapist who fled country to escape charges
- Charles Lindbergh, iconic aviator, husband of Anne Morrow Lindbergh, lived on Tokeneke Trail

== See also ==
- List of people from Connecticut
- List of people from Bridgeport, Connecticut
- List of people from Brookfield, Connecticut
- List of people from Greenwich, Connecticut
- List of people from Hartford, Connecticut
- List of people from New Canaan, Connecticut
- List of people from New Haven, Connecticut
- List of people from Norwalk, Connecticut
- List of people from Redding, Connecticut
- List of people from Ridgefield, Connecticut
- List of people from Stamford, Connecticut
- List of people from Westport, Connecticut
