= Jacob Conde =

Puerto Rican association football player

Personal information
- Full name: Jacob Rafael Conde
- Date of birth: October 13, 1992 (age 34)
- Place of birth: Hartford, Connecticut, United States
- Height: 5 ft 9 in (1.75 m)
- Position: Defender

College career
Years	Team	Apps	(Gls)
2010–2013	Medaille Mavericks	49	(2)

Senior career*
Years	Team	Apps	(Gls)
2014–2015	Eccleshill United		
2015	Marbella United	8	(0)
2016	HAŠK		
2016–2019	Mass United		
2019–2020	Hartford City		

International career
2016–2019	Puerto Rico	7	(0)
- * Club domestic league appearances and goals

Jacob Rafael Conde (born October 13, 1992) is a former Puerto Rican football player. He played in England, Spain and Croatia, as well as his native United States.

== Career statistics ==
=== Club ===
Club	Season	League			Cup		Other		Total	
Club	Season	Division	Apps	Goals	Apps	Goals	Apps	Goals	Apps	Goals
Marbella United	2015–16	Tercera Andaluza Málaga	8	0	0	0	0	0	8	0
Career total			8	0	0	0	0	0	8	0

=== International ===
National team	Year	Apps	Goals
Puerto Rico	2016	3	0
Puerto Rico	2017	0	0
Puerto Rico	2018	0	0
Puerto Rico	2019	4	0
Total		7	0
