= Mary A. Wray =

American actress (1804 – 1892)

- Born: Mary A. Retan; 1804
- Died: October 5, 1892 (aged 88); Newtown, New York, U.S.
- Occupation: Actress
- Years active: 1826–1864
- Spouse: Mr. Wray
- Children: 4

Mary A. Wray (née Retan; 1804 – October 5, 1892) was an American actress known for her significant contributions to the theater in the 19th century. Beginning her career as a dancer at the Chatham Street Theater in New York City, she quickly rose to prominence in the dramatic arts. Wray's notable performances included roles alongside renowned actors such as Edwin Forrest and Junius Brutus Booth. She was an active member of the American Dramatic Fund for over thirty-five years and was considered the oldest representative of the American stage at the time of her death.

== Biography ==
Mary A. Retan was born in 1804 in Ridgefield, Connecticut. In 1826, she married Mr. Wray. Shortly after her marriage, she began her career in the theater.

Wray made her debut as a dancer at the Chatham Street Theater in New York City. She quickly progressed in the dramatic arts, notable for her performance as Lady Macbeth alongside Edwin Forrest at the Walnut Street Theater in Philadelphia. For six years, Wray performed at the Old Bowery Theater in New York City, where she supported Junius Brutus Booth, the father of Edwin Booth. She also toured the southern United States with a company that included Joseph Jefferson and John Ellsler, performing in Charleston, South Carolina. In 1848, she became a member of the Seguin Opera Company. Wray retired from the stage in 1864.

Wray's family included four children. Her son, known on the minstrel stage as "Billy Wray," died in the burning of the "Evening Star" in 1866. Her other son, Edward, also died in 1866 in Illinois. Wray was survived by two daughters and several grandchildren.

After her retirement, Wray moved out to her country home purchased by her son Billy Wray. Wray was a member of the American Dramatic Fund for over thirty-five years. She died on October 5, 1892, in Newtown, New York. At the time of her death, she was recognized as the oldest American actress.
