= Peter St. John =

American poet

Peter St. John (Jan. 11, 1726, Norwalk, Connecticut-Jan. 4, 1811, Walton, New York) was an American poet and schoolteacher from Norwalk, Connecticut, who supported the Patriot cause during the American Revolution.

== Works ==
St. John’s better-known poems include The Death of Abel, An Historical or rather a Conjectural Poem; Relating Many Things Which Might Probably Take Place Both Before and After That Barbarous Fratricide (1793) and American Taxation (1765), which features new lyrics set to the well-known colonial tune The British Grenadiers.

== Imprisonment ==
On July 22, 1781, St. John was among forty-eight congregants captured when Tories surrounded the Congregational Church in present-day Darien, Connecticut. St. John and the others, including the church’s revered pastor Moses Mather, were made to walk to Long Island Sound, where they were loaded onto a ship bound for Lloyd's Neck, Long Island where they were held in cruel, filthy conditions. Thereafter, half of the prisoners, including St. John, were sent to New York, where they were paraded through the streets before a jeering crowd and held in the Provost Prison as prisoners of war. St. John was imprisoned until the end of December, 1781, when he was freed along with eighteen other survivors in a prisoner exchange. The incident became the basis for St. John’s poem Descent on Middlesex, a Poetical Relation of the Capture of the Congregation at Middlesex...with an Account of their Sufferings &c. while in captivity.

== See also ==
- United States poetry
- List of poets from the United States
