= Steven Black (businessman) =

American businessman

Steven D. Black
- Born: 1953 (age 72–73)
- Education: Duke University (BA)
- Occupation: Investment Banker
- Employer: JPMorgan Chase & Co.
- Title: Co-CEO of Investment Banking
- Spouse: Lyn Murdock Black
- Parent: Creed Carter Black
- Relatives: Jackson V.

Steven "Steve" D. Black (born 1953) is the former vice-chairman of JPMorgan Chase & Co. He previously served as the Co-Chief Executive Officer of J.P. Morgan, the investment banking subsidiary of JPMorgan Chase.

== Biography ==
Black is a 1974 graduate of Duke University, and has served on the New York Development Council. In October 2009 he was succeeded by Jes Staley. He began his career at Smith Barney, where he was part of the company's trainee program in 1974. He rose to become the head of the company's capital markets division and, by 1993, he was appointed vice chairman. He left the company in 1998 together with his mentor, Jamie Dimon, who was then the company's president.

In 2000, JPMorgan tapped Black to head its global equities unit. He was credited for the company's acquisition of Bear Sterns.

In April 2020, he was elected to the board of Wells Fargo.

Black and his wife Lyn live in Greenwich, Connecticut.
