= Alexander Rummler =

American painter

Alexander Joseph Rummler
- Born: Alexander Joseph Rummler; July 25, 1867; Dubuque, Iowa
- Died: 1959; Stamford, Connecticut
- Education: Jean-Paul Laurens at the Académie Julian
- Known for: Murals
- Patrons: Works Progress Administration

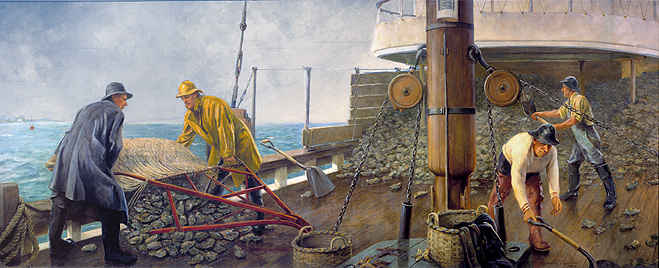
Dredging For Oysters by Alexander Rummler, Works Progress Administration mural

Alexander Joseph Rummler (July 25, 1867 – 1959) was an American painter best known for his work on murals and billboards.

Rummler was born in Dubuque, Iowa to German immigrants Joseph and Rosalia Rummler. In 1888 Rummler traveled to New York to study art at the Art Students League of New York. In 1905 Rummler moved with his wife, Maria, and their children to Europe to further study painting at the Académie Julian in Paris with Jean-Paul Laurens. He moved to South Norwalk, Connecticut in 1907.

Rummler became known nationwide at the end of World War I when his painting of the signing of the armistice was displayed on billboards. In 1926 he was chosen to represent Connecticut in the Philadelphia Exposition of 1926, where his paintings took first place.

In 1936 Rummler began working for the Works Progress Administration painting murals for the then still under construction Norwalk High School. He painted sixteen murals and eight smaller panels depicting life in Norwalk. During this time he also served as town treasurer of Norwalk.

In 1942 Rummler moved to Stamford, Connecticut. He died at the age of 92 in 1959.
