= Hells Angels MC criminal allegations and incidents in Ontario =

Criminal incidents involving the Hells Angels in Canadian province

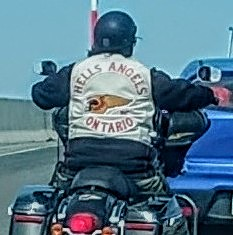
Ontario Hells Angels member

The Hells Angels Motorcycle Club (HAMC), an international outlaw biker gang, has been involved in multiple crimes, alleged crimes, and violent incidents in Ontario since its establishment in the province in 2000.

== Origins ==
In the summer of 2000, the Hells Angels national president Walter Stadnick made an offer to most of the Ontario outlaw biker gangs that was too sweet for them to refuse; namely they could join the Hells Angels "patch for patch", allowing them to enter the Hells Angels with patches equivalent to their current patches. On 29 December 2000, most of the Ontario biker gangs in a mass "patch over" in at the clubhouse of the Hells Angels Montreal chapter in Sorel joined the Hells Angels. In the ceremony in Sorel, 179 bikers from the Satan's Choice, Para-Dice Riders, the Last Chance, the Lobos, the Outlaws and the Rock Machine joined the Hells Angels, making them at one stroke the dominant biker gang in Ontario. The police stated that the Satan's Choice and the Para-Dice Riders were strong biker gangs worthy of joining the Hells Angels, but the Last Chance and the Lobos were "mumblies" (slang for drug addicts who were said to mumble all the time because of their drug-addled state).. Andy Stewart of the Ontario Provancial Police's Anti-Biker Unit said: "They're loyal to each other until they die-and then the next day they're swapping patches with guys who are their sworn enemies. I think it all boils down to money. That's what drives these guys. Why stay with such a small group when you can go to the Hells Angels and become part of an international gang that has contracts all over the world?".

From Satan's Choice, the Hells Angels formed chapters in Sudbury, Thunder Bay, Simcoe County, Kitchener, Oshawa, Keswick and a chapter in Toronto that became the Angels Toronto East chapter. From the Para-Dice Riders, the Hells Angels formed chapters in Woodbridge and a chapter in Toronto that became the Toronto Central chapter. From the Lobos, the Hells Angels formed a chapter in Windsor. From the Last Chance, the Hells Angels formed the Toronto West chapter. And a group of defectors from the Rock Machine and the Outlaws formed the Nomad chapter based in Ottawa. On 12 April 2001, the Hells Angels formed a chapter in London, Ontario headed by the Coates brothers, John and Jimmy. Donny Petersen of the Para-Dice Riders became the Hells Angels national secretary and their chief spokesman. The Hells Angels in Ontario were quickly embraced by the political and business elites of Ontario, best symbolized by an incident on 12 January 2002 when Mel Lastman, the mayor of Toronto gate-clashed a Hells Angels national convention to thank them for bringing so much "business" to Toronto. Standing before a group of journalists, Lastman was photographed shaking hands with a Hells Angel, Tony Biancaflora, while telling the media that the Hells Angels were "a nice bunch of guys".

The most important of the Hells Angels chapters in Ontario were the Downtown Toronto chapter headed by John "Winner" Neal, the former president of the Para-Dice Riders, and the Niagara chapter headed by Gerald Ward, As usual with the Hells Angels, a number of puppet clubs were formed such as the Dogs of War club in Niagara Falls and the Redline Crew in Toronto that did much of the Angels' work for them. Paul Porter. one of the leaders of the Rock Machine, became the president of the Nomad chapter based in Ottawa.

== Drug trafficking ==
In the greater Toronto area, the cocaine sold by the Hells Angels is reported as being 85%-90% pure owing to competition from the Mafia and Asian gangs. In northern Ontario where the Hells Angels have no rivals, the cocaine is diluted to about 25%, which thereby brings in a greater profit. Don Bell of the Ontario Provincial Police's Anti-Biker Enforcement Unit told the journalists William Marsden and Julian Sher in 2006: "In the north the HA more or less control the market. It's Red-and-White coke or no coke. In the North they are the game".

== Conflict with the Outlaws ==
In June 2001, the Outlaws clubhouse in Woodstock was burned down by the Hells Angels. In July 2001, a Hells Angels "prospect", Douglas "Plug" Johnstone, visited Garry Smith, a car dealer in London, Ontario to demand that he pay $70, 000 in extortion money. When Smith refused, Johnstone returned with Jimmy Coates of the London chapter, to demand that Smith pay the money. During a third visit, Coates told Smith: "We know where you live. We know you have a wife. We know you have a daughter". Along with a third Angel, Thomas Walkinshaw, Coates and Johnstone stormed into Smith's house to demand the money; Smith paid them the $70, 000 and the three Angels were arrested leaving his house with the money. On 7 January 2002, four members of the Jackals, a Hells Angels puppet gang in London, Ontario, were involved in a shoot-out at the house of an Outlaw at 434 Egerton in London. The Jackals gathered outside of the house of Thomas Hughes, the president of the Outlaws London chapter, leading to a shoot-out that saw a Jackal, Eric Davingnon, shot in the stomach after Hughes and another Outlaw, Marcus Cornelisse, opened fire. The shoot-out ended with the Jackels fleeing in their car as Hughes and Cornelisse ran down the street shooting at them.

== Extortion ==
The Hells Angels chapter in London, Ontario was dominated by two brothers, John and Jimmy Coates. John Coates was a large statured man, with a height of 6 foot 7 inches, and weighing 300 pounds, and worked for the Angels' Sherbrooke chapter, while his younger brother Jimmy, although not as big as his older brother, was described as a very intimidating individual. In July 2001, Gerry Smith, owner of a car dealership in London was threatened by a Hells Angels member, Douglas "Plug" Johnson who told him had to pay the Angels $70,000 immediately. The following week, Jimmy Coates, the president of the Angels' London chapter at the time, arrived to tell Smith and verbally threatened him by saying, "We know where you live. We know you have a wife. We know you have a daughter". Smith informed the police of the threat. A week later, Coates, Johnson and another Angel, Thomas Walinshaw, knocked on the door of Johnson's house to tell him to pay the $70,000 as Walinshaw maintained he "didn't want to see anyone get hurt". Finally after Smith paid the $70,000, the police arrested all three men for extortion. At their trial, the three men maintained that they had no weapons, but the Crown Attorney, Elizabeth Maguire, argued that the mere fact the men were wearing jackets with the Hells Angels patches when they went to Smith's house was a threat alone, saying: "The weapon of that was held to Mr. Smith's head, his wife's head, his daughter's head was the Hells Angels". The three men pleaded guilty to lesser charges.

== Shoot-out on the 401 ==
On 10 March 2002, two members of the Hells Angels Montreal puppet gang, the Rockers, Daniel Lamer and Marc Bouffard, were stopped by the OPP on the 401 highway just outside of Kingston. Lamar opened fire on the OPP constable, wounding Constable Dan Brisson. A shoot-out followed that saw Lamar shot dead by the OPP. Found inside of the car that Lamer and Bouffard were using were four handguns, a silencer, a balaclava, and pictures of every single Bandido in Ontario.

== Project Shirlea ==
In April 2003, the OPP launched Project Shirlea using information gathered by a waitress turned informer. The OPP arrested 14 Hells Angels from the downtown Toronto, East Toronto, North Toronto, Simcoe County and Keswick chapters with regard to the "Quebec connection" as the smuggling route from Montreal was known. The OPP alleged that the sleazy bar, the Country Behops, in Toronto was the base for selling cocaine and prescription drugs. However, the Crown assigned only two Crown Attorneys to prosecuting Project Shirlea vs. the 86 defense lawyers hired by the Angels, which overwhelmed the Crown attorneys so much that the Project Shirlea chargers were either dropped or reduced as a result of plea bargains. The most senior Angel charged was Thomas Craig, the secretary of the downtown Toronto chapter, who received six years in prison in a plea bargain.

== The Lindsay case ==
In September 2004, two Angels, Steven "Tiger" Lindsay and Raymond Bonner, were convicted of extorting $75,000 from a black-market satellite dealer in Barrie. Both Angels had arrived at the man's house wearing their patches while a police bug recorded Lindsay as saying to pay the money or else deal with "five other guys that are fucking the same kind of motherfucker as I am". Justice Micelle Fuerst also convicted the two men of gangsterism, saying "...they presented themselves not as individuals, but as members of a group with a reputation for violence and intimidation. They deliberately invoked their membership in the HAMC with the intent to inspire fear in the victim. They committed extortion with the intent to do so in association with a criminal organization, the HAMC to which they belonged".

== Project Tandem ==
Steven Gault, the treasurer of the Angels' Oshawa chapter, was already a police informer when he joined the Angels in 2000. On the basis of the evidence collected by him, the OPP launched Project Tandem in June 2006 that lead to the arrests of 27 people. In September 2006, after an 18-month investigation conducted by numerous law enforcement agencies, 500 officers and 21 tactical teams raided property connected to the Hells Angels chapters in Ontario at the conclusion of Project Tandem. At least 27 people were arrested of which 15 were members of the Hells Angels. Property seized was worth more than 1 million dollars and included $470,000 in cash, $300,000 in vehicles and $140,000 in motorcycles. During the raids, drugs such as cocaine and ecstasy were seized; the total street value of drugs seized was more than 3 million dollars. Project Tandem was made possible by recruiting Gault to serve as an informer, who is believed to have been the first Canadian "full patch" Hells Angel to wear a wire for the police and who served as the star witness for the Crown in the subsequent trials. The most prominent of the Angels arrested was Ward. Ward was convicted of gangsterism on 25 March 2009 and sentenced to 14 years in prison..

== Project Develop ==
In 2005, David Atwell, the sergeant-at-arms of the Angels Downtown Toronto chapter, became a police informer. In April 2007, after another 18-month investigation dubbed "Project Develop," 32 Hells Angels clubhouses were raided in Ontario, New Brunswick and British Columbia. The Hells Angels clubhouse on 498 Eastern Avenue in Toronto was raided by the Biker Enforcement Unit of the Ontario Provincial Police (OPP) and members of the Toronto Police Service on 4 April 2007, and at least fifteen members of the Hells Angels were detained and charged with drug and weapons offenses at the Eastern Avenue clubhouse raid. According to police, Project Develop seized some 500 litres of GHB worth an estimated $996,000, nine kilograms of cocaine, two kilograms of hashish and oxycodone and Viagra pills. Police also seized $21,000 in cash. Project Develop also seized 67 rifles, five handguns, three pairs of brass knuckles and a police baton. Project Develop was made possible by recruiting David Atwell to serve as an informer. On the basis of the information provided by Atwell, the police charged 31 Hells Angels with 169 criminal charges, plus seized drugs worth $3 million and property worth half-million dollars.

At a trial that took place between September 2010 and May 2011 where Atwell was the star witness for the Crown, five Hells Angels including John "Winner" Neal, the president of the Downtown Toronto chapter, were convicted on charges relating to dealing in GHB and cocaine plus possession of illegal weapons, but all of the accused were acquitted on charges of belonging to a criminal organization. On 21 May 2011, five of the accused arrested as part of Project Develop were convicted by a jury of various drug offences including trafficking in cocaine and oxycodone, participating in a conspiracy to traffic GHB and possession of GHB for the purpose of trafficking. One of the accused was convicted of possessing a restricted firearm without a license. However, one accused, represented by defence lawyer Lenny Hochberg, was acquitted of two counts of trafficking handguns and possession of brass knuckles and another accused, Larry Pooler the Toronto chapter vice-president who represented himself, was acquitted of two counts of possessing unrestricted firearms without a license, two counts of trafficking oxycodone and one count of participating in a conspiracy to traffic GHB. Furthermore, all accused were acquitted of all charges of acting in association with, or for the benefit of, a criminal organization.

== Project Manchester ==
On 15 December 2009, the OPP arrested Andre Watteel, the president of the Hells Angels Kitchener chapter and the owner of the Barking Fish Cafe in Cambridge on charges of 28 counts of drug trafficking and 27 counts of the possession of the proceeds of crime. On 12 January 2011, a in plea bargain with the Crown, Watteel admitted to selling cocaine to an undercover police officer in exchange for the other charges being dropped; Wateel was sentenced to 4 years in prison.

== Book ==
- Langton, Jerry (2010). Showdown: How the Outlaws, Hells Angels and Cops Fought for Control of the Streets. Toronto: John Wiley. ISBN 978-0470678787.
- Langton, Jerry (2015). Cold War How Organized Crime Works in Canada and Why It's About to Get More Violent. Toronto: HarperColllins. ISBN 978-1-4434-3255-9.
- Sher, Julian; Marsden, William (2003). The Road To Hell How the Biker Gangs Are Conquering Canada. Toronto: Alfred Knopf. ISBN 0-676-97598-4.
- Sher, Julian; Marsden, William (2006). Angels of Death: Inside the Bikers' Empire of Crime. Toronto: Alfred Knopf Canada. ISBN 9780307370327.
