= List of people from New Canaan, Connecticut =

List of notable people

The following people are associated with New Canaan, Connecticut and notable far beyond it (including those who were born in, raised in, lived in, worked in, or died in town):

== Actors, directors, producers ==
- Tony Goldwyn, actor, Scandal
- Katherine Heigl, actress
- Christopher Lloyd, actor
- Michael McCusker, film editor
- Christopher Meloni, actor, Law & Order SVU
- Martin Mull (born 1943), actor and comedian
- Sarah Rafferty, actor, known for Suits
- Allison Williams, actor, Girls
- Richard Gere, actor

== Musicians ==
- Liona Boyd, classical guitarist and composer
- Edie Brickell, singer, wife of Paul Simon
- Harry Connick Jr., singer
- Merrill Garbus, founder of indie-pop band Tune-Yards
- Stephen Jenks (1772–1856), composer, teacher, and tunebook compiler
- Paul Simon, singer-songwriter, husband of Edie Brickell

== Athletes and those in the sports industry ==
- Zach Allen, current defensive end for the Denver Broncos
- Curt Casali (born 1988), current baseball catcher for the San Francisco Giants
- Dave Eichelberger, Jr. (born 1943), professional golfer
- Terry Hanratty, NFL quarterback 1969–1976 for the Pittsburgh Steelers and Tampa Bay Buccaneers
- Pierre McGuire (born 1961), ice hockey analyst, former NHL coach and scout
- George H. Morris (born 1938), equestrian
- Lucas Niang, former offensive lineman for the Kansas City Chiefs
- Elmer Oliphant (1892–1975), football player
- Max Pacioretty (born 1988), NHL player for the Toronto Maple Leafs
- Doug Perlman, sports media executive
- Bill Toomey, 1968 Olympic decathlon champion
- Christopher "Mad Dog" Russo, sports talk-show personality on WFAN radio
- Fay Vincent, eighth commissioner of Major League Baseball 1989–1992

== Journalists ==
- Tyler Kendall, Washington Correspondent, Bloomberg Television
- Glenn Beck, television and radio commentator
- Ann Coulter, commentator
- Ann Curry, former co-host of NBC's Today
- Buzz Kanter, motorcycle magazine publisher (American Iron Magazine, Garage Build)
- Armen Keteyian (born 1953), television reporter
- Mike Wallace, 60 Minutes correspondent
- Brian Williams, former anchor of NBC Nightly News and former host of The 11th Hour with Brian Williams
- Sid Yudain, founder of Roll Call

== Authors, writers ==
(not including journalists)

- Bliss Carman, Canadian poet
- A. J. Cronin, Scottish novelist
- Peter D'Adamo, naturopathic physician and author
- Jack Douglas, writer
- Phoebe Dunn, author and photographer of children's books
- Edward Eager, children's author and playwright
- Gerald Green (1922–2006), author
- Fran Lebowitz, writer and humorist
- Douglas Marland, soap opera writer
- Rick Moody, author of The Ice Storm
- Maxwell Perkins (1884–1947), editor of F. Scott Fitzgerald and Thomas Wolfe
- Armstrong Sperry, Newbery Medal-winning author of Call It Courage
- Peter von Ziegesar, writer and memoirist

== Artists, architects, designers ==
- Solon Borglum, sculptor
- Roland Crandall, early animator
- Philip C. Johnson (1906–2005), architect who built and lived in the Ponus Ridge Glass House
- John Black Lee, architect
- Eliot Noyes, architect and industrial designer for IBM
- Glenora Richards, miniature painter and postage stamp designer
- Rudolph von Ripper, war artist and Office of Strategic Services agent
- Arthur Szyk, anti-Nazi cartoonist and book illustrator; artist

== Government ==
- Chris Dodd, U.S. senator for Connecticut
- Justin Elicker, mayor of New Haven, Connecticut
- Stuart Symington, U.S. senator for Missouri and Secretary of the Air Force
- Walter Childs Wood (1864–1953), state legislator and retired surgeon

== Business ==
- Rich Barton, CEO of Zillow Group and founder of Expedia
- Dave Checketts, former CEO of Madison Square Garden
- Gary Crittenden, CFO of Citigroup
- Jeff Immelt, CEO of General Electric
- Nigel MacEwan, former CEO of Kleinwort Benson North America; former president of Merrill Lynch
- Erika Nardini, CEO of Barstool Sports
- David Neeleman, CEO of JetBlue Airways
- Daniel Rotman, Founder and CEO of PrettyLitter
- Rich Riley, CEO of Shazam
- Stephen S. Roach, economist and senior fellow at Yale University
- Monroe Trout (born 1962), formerly American, hedge fund manager

== Other ==
- Emily Barringer (1876–1961), physician; first female ambulance surgeon
- H. Keith H. Brodie, former Duke University president
- Anthony Comstock Christian activist and reactionary, namesake of Comstock laws
- Marion Dickerman, with her lover Nancy Cook, suffragists
- Kathy Giusti, founder of the Multiple Myeloma Foundation
- Henry Hanford (1784–1866), first Euro-American settler of Lewistown, Ohio

== See also ==
- List of people from Connecticut
- List of people from Bridgeport, Connecticut
- List of people from Brookfield, Connecticut
- List of people from Darien, Connecticut
- List of people from Greenwich, Connecticut
- List of people from Hartford, Connecticut
- List of people from New Haven, Connecticut
- List of people from Norwalk, Connecticut
- List of people from Redding, Connecticut
- List of people from Ridgefield, Connecticut
- List of people from Stamford, Connecticut
- List of people from Westport, Connecticut
