= Riding Into History =

Riding Into History is a non-profit vintage motorcycle event founded in 2000 by Billy Aldrich. It was created in order to celebrate the heritage and history of motorcycles. The event also raised money for designated charities, that have changed over the years. It has now become one of America's premier motorcycle events and the attendance has increased every year.

== History ==
Billy Aldrich is the founder of a vintage motorcycle club in Northeast Florida. His wife, Jackie, survived breast cancer and inspired him to create the event. The event was named Riding Into History by William Robinson, a vintage motorcycle enthusiast, noting that the name implies a trip into the history of the motorcycles.

Since its inception, Riding Into History has been held at the World Golf Village near St. Augustine, Florida. It was also nationally featured on the Speed Channel.

Proceeds go to Buddy Check 12, which is a partnership between Baptist Health and First Coast News (WTLV/WJXX). This organization creates a link between women who call each other on the 12th of every month to verify that their partner has done her self-breast check, thus enabling early detection of the disease. More than half a million women in the country are participating in the program. The event, featured on WTLV in Jacksonville, was originated by Jeannie Blaylock, the news anchor for First Coast News.

In 2010, Riding Into History changed their charity to the Wounded Warrior Project. As of 2013, they have contributed $105,000 to this charity.

In 2014, Riding Into History again changed their charity to K9s For Warriors an organization that trains rescue dogs as service dogs for PTSD warriors. Riding Into History's first donation to K9s For Warriors will be a record donation. The donation will be matched by the Weaver Foundation.

To date, Riding Into History, has donated over $300,000 to charity.

== Activities ==
Riding Into History is held every year on the 3rd Saturday in May. The organization is independent and run by volunteers from BMW Motorcycle Owners of North East Florida (BMWNEF), and the Historic Motorcycle Society. Other area motorcycle clubs, such as the Jacksonville Beach Chrome Divas and the Christian Motorcycle Association have also given their support to the event. Riding Into History has several facets:

=== Concours d'Elegance ===
The Concours d'Elegance competition attracts between 300 and 400 antique and vintage motorcycles each year. Collectors from all over America bring their motorcycles to the show, and they are displayed around the lake which forms the centerpiece of the World Golf Village. There are numerous exhibitors at the Concours, as well as representatives from several motorcycle clubs. For the 15th annual Riding Into History, the Barber Vintage Motorsports Museum had a display of 9 motorcycles considered exceedingly rare. Their display included a 1926 Ace 4 cylinder in mid-restoration and a 1914 Indian electric start original and operational motorcycle. They also brought a 1961 Honda RC161/4 GP, a 1979 Yamaha TZ750 E, ex Henry DeGouw, a 1969 M.V. Agusta 250 twin scrambler, a 1973 BSA/Triumph Dick Mann Daytona replica, 1967 Moto-Guzzi ISDT, a 2000 Lakewood custom, and a 1994 Harley Davidson VR1000.

=== Charity rides ===
These are charity rides for any motorcycle riders who wish to visit the event in North Florida. They ride from either Adamec Harley Davidson, Baymeadows or BMW Motorcycles of Jacksonville, Orange Park to the World Golf Village to see the Concours. VIP parking is provided, along with tickets to the Concours.

=== Grand Marshal dinner ===
The Grand Marshal dinner takes place the evening before the Concours. It starts with a silent auction and introduces the Grand Marshal as a guest speaker. The latter are always celebrities in the field. Craig Vetter was the 2004 grand marshal of the event; he is a famous motorcycle designer and author, Dennis Gage (2005) is the Television producer and host of TV shows on the Speed Channel, Peter Egan (2006) is an author and columnist for Cycle World magazine, Kel Carruthers (2007) is a former world champion motorcycle road racer, and Mert Lawwill (2008) was Grand National Champion and starred with Steve McQueen in On Any Sunday. In 2013, Buzz Kanter, editor of American Iron Magazine and Dale Walksler from the Wheels Through Time Museum, were dueling Grand Marshals. The 15th annual Riding Into History Grand Marshal was Dave Despain, the voice and face of motorcycle racing announcing.

=== Historic ride ===
This event is held on Friday morning before the Concours. The participants, who entered their motorcycles in the Concours, take their own motorcycles from the World Golf Village to Corky Bells in old Florida Palatka for a lunch. The goal is to present the antique and vintage bikes to the public and to enjoy riding into history.
