= Titan Motorcycle Company =

American motorcycle manufacturer

- Company type: Privately owned corporation
- Founded: 1994
- Headquarters: Phoenix, Arizona; Toronto, Canada
- Key people: Ovenden Family
- Products: Motorcycle, Clothing, Licensing, Parts, Etc
- Revenue: ▲US$ 5-10 Million (2003)
- Number of employees: fewer than 50 (2009)

Titan Motorcycle Company was an American motorcycle manufacturer that was founded in 1995 in Phoenix, Arizona and was the first custom motorcycle company to produce in volume.

== History ==
=== Founding ===
At the time Titan was founded because there was a shortage of new Harley-Davidsons, and those who were lucky enough to get a new one would quite often disassemble them and add many chrome custom parts. There was a market for fast available mildly customized bikes. These motorcycles had a registered name and a valid VIN and were easy to finance but at first not easy to insure due to bank uncertainty with the manufacturing processes. This carried over to the Blue-Book listing where it caused incorrect prices on these motorcycles and made it difficult for sellers to get the correct price. The few specialty motorcycles like the Titan Phoenix TRM Custom where only 25 were built, one at a time each bike built or put together by one person. Titan owners went public on the NASDAQ in 1997.

=== First bankruptcy ===
By 2001, the management had failed, then dealer and customer support failed and Titan filed for bankruptcy. Andrew Donald Proudfoot owned the largest Titan dealership in Florida and was stuck with a large inventory of Titan motorcycles. He also went to Titan's headquarters and bought the company in July 2001. Titan number 2 was born but went under due to the Company owing more to vendors than it had the capital to pay for their services. The new competition from companies like Big Dog, American IronHorse and many other Harley clones companies, and also because of a declining American motorcycle market since the beginning of 2007.

=== Second bankruptcy ===
In January 2007, Titan Motorcycles Cie (TMC) had filed a voluntary petition for relief under Chapter 11 of the Bankruptcy Code. In August 2007 an asset purchase agreement was signed between TMC (Titan Motorcycle Cie) debtor in-possession and Arizona Motorcycle Works as buyer where all assets of Titan were sold to Arizona Motorcycle Works. An Arizona bank called FNBA filed an objection to the proposed sale of now-bankrupt Titan's assets to Arizona Motorcycle Works claiming it has a first rights lien on Titan's assets and that the sale price undervalued the fair market value of the property. The bank also claims that Titan's owner Don Proudfoot and Hope Smith, a principal in Arizona Motorcycle Works, have a personal relationship and that the latter company is subtenant of Titan's and that this relationship has not been disclosed. These two allegations called into question that the proposed sale represents a "good-faith, arms-length negotiation" between the two entities, the complaint claimed. FNBA stated that Proudfoots’ company, TMC Acquisitions, owes the bank about $813,000 on a $1.5 million business loan that the company took out in February 2006.
