= Donny Petersen =

American outlaw biker (1947–2021)

- Born: Robert Donald Petersen; 17 April 1947; Toronto, Ontario, Canada
- Died: 12 December 2021 (aged 74); Oshawa, Ontario, Canada
- Occupations: Outlaw biker, motorcycle mechanic, writer
- Known for: National secretary of the Hells Angels in Canada

Robert Donald "Donny" Petersen (17 April 1947 – 12 December 2021) was a Canadian outlaw biker, writer, and alleged gangster. The author of 21 books, Petersen won the International Book Award in 2012, 2013 and 2014, and served as the national secretary and principal spokesman for the Hells Angels Motorcycle Club in Canada.

== Para-Dice Riders ==
Petersen was born in Toronto to a middle-class family. In his late teens, he joined the Para-Dice Riders, an outlaw biker club based in Toronto. Petersen graduated from North Toronto Collegiate Institute. Petersen attended York University where he studied Urban Planning, but did not graduate.

Petersen began his career as a social worker in downtown Toronto. Accordingly, to the biography posted on his website, Petersen "then began working with drug-induced problems in the early-seventies hippie era". He was notably vague on whose "drug induced problems" he resolved or how. In 1973, Petersen opened Heavy Duty Cycles, which became one of the most successful motorcycle shops in Toronto. He also was a successful columnist on motorcycle-related topics with his writings appearing in both Canada and abroad in various magazines. Petersen rose up became the vice president of the Para-Dice Riders. Petersen's nickname as an young man was "Sleaze". One policeman stated in 2003 that Petersen was confrontational, saying: "Donny got right in the middle – he was at the forefront. He's got that streak. But these days you don't see it. It's well hidden now". Starting in 1992 and continuing right up to his death, Petersen wrote a monthly column entitled "Techline" in American Iron Magazine.

Petersen had no criminal record and in 1996 sued the Ontario Provincial Police (OPP) for their roadside stop policy for outlaw bikers, claiming that this was harassment. In the spring of 1997, he went to Havana as a guest of the Canadian embassy to work as a guest lecturer at the Havana Harley Riders Club. In September 1997, Petersen – who favored having the Para-Dice Riders join the Hells Angels – welcomed the Hells Angels national president Walter Stadnick to Toronto. In the fall of 1997, Petersen became the first outlaw biker to address the prestigious Empire Club of Toronto, which the journalist Jerry Langton noted was "...an honor normally reserved for heads of state and titans of industry". Previous speakers at the Empire Club included former U.S. president Ronald Reagan, the evangelist Billy Graham and the 14th Dalai Lama. Petersen was a successful and wealthy businessman whose many friends in Toronto's corporate elite included Gareth Seltzer, a well known Bay Street investor. Seltzer was also the president of the Empire Club at the time. Seltzer invited Petersen to speak at the Empire Club on the subject of being both a successful businessman and outlaw biker. Petersen's speech to a well-heeled crowd, which included some of the most wealthiest and powerful people in Toronto, was well received. Petersen's speech at the Empire Club represented a trend of the outlaw biker sub-culture becoming part of the mainstream of Canadian life. Sitting alongside Petersen at his table at the Empire Club were Charles Dubin, the former chief justice of the Ontario Court of Appeal, and Alan Borovoy, the president of the Canadian Civil Liberties Association.

In February 2000, Deanne Cunningham, the Ontario Minister of Training, Colleges and Universities, appointed Petersen to be the chief of a government committee assessing apprenticeship training for mechanics. Petersen was appointed to head the committee because of his "expertise and experience", with his membership of the Para-Dice Riders not being a handicap. Petersen personified the embourgeoisement of the Canadian outlaw bikers, going from having long hair and a shaggy appearance as an young man to becoming a businessman with trimmed hair and a 'respectable' appearance in his middle-age.

== Hells Angels ==
On 29 December 2000, Petersen joined the Hells Angels. At a ceremony at the clubhouse of the Hells Angels' "mother chapter" in Sorel-Tracy, Petersen burned his Para-Dice Rider colours and put on a Hells Angel jacket. Petersen became the national secretary of the Hells Angels and their principal spokesman, a role for which was selected for by Stadnick. When the Hells Angels held a convention in Toronto on 12 January 2002, Petersen bristled during a press conference at the suggestion that the Angels were a "gang" as he insisted that the Angels were merely a "motorcycle club". As a public relations move, Petersen had all of the Hells Angels attending the convention donate to the local food bank. The convention was crashed by Mel Lastman, the mayor of Toronto, who posted for photographs with the Angels and thanked them for bringing so much "business" to Toronto. As he posed for a photograph with Tony Biancaflora of the Angels, Lastman told the assembled journalists that the Angels were "fantastic" and were "a nice bunch of guys".

Petersen used the Lastman incident to argue to the media that the Hells Angels were not a criminal organization. At that the point, the media discovered that Petersen was still in charge of the Ontario government's apprenticeship program. The revelation that the Hells Angels national secretary was the director of the Ontario apprenticeship program caused much controversy, and led the Ontario government to fire Petersen. In a letter announcing his firing, it was stated that he was being terminated because of "...your association with the Hells Angels". Amid a blaze of publicity, Petersen sued the Ontario government, claiming his right to free association has just been violated. Petersen wrote in his lawsuit: "My membership in a motorcycle club has always been and continues to be an important part of my personal belief system in individual freedoms and defiance of arbitrary and unlawful authority". In December 2002, Petersen lost his case with the Superior Court of Ontario ruling that the government was justified in firing him.

Petersen, described as the unofficial leader of the Hells Angels in Ontario, was known for his "brash" style. Petersen pioneered Hells Angels stores that sold Angel-related merchandise and clothing, through notably none of the items on sale bore the Hells Angels winged death head logo or their name, instead saying 81 (H is the eighth letter of the Latin alphabet while A is the first). The "support gear" on sale had slogans such as "Support 81" and ACAB (an abbreviation for "All Cops Are Bastards") Petersen told the media about the stores: "Obviously, we want to make money off them. And we do make good money off them". Langton noted that Petersen's assertion about the profitability of the stores seemed to be correct as he noted that business was very brisk at the one Toronto Hells Angels store he visited with a massive number of Torontonians buying clothing, hats and other merchandise covered with the numbers 81. The embourgeoisement associated with Petersen was very typical of the Hells Angels by the early 21st century. The Canadian criminologist Steven Schneider noted in 2009 that the popular stereotype of the Canadian Hells Angels as shaggy, disreputable types with long hair and long beards living on the margins of Canadian society is not true and has not been for some time. Schneider described the typical Canadian Hells Angels in the 21st century as well dressed, well trimmed, clean-cut businessmen who drive luxury cars and live in affluent suburbs, stating the club now aims to project a 'respectable' image. Sher and Marsden described Petersen as "a smart, smooth-talking businessman who would eventually rise to the top of the Hells Angels hierarchy in Ontario. Petersen is now neat and proper, his trim, light-colored hair belying his fifty-four years".

Petersen remained the principal spokesman for the Hells Angels, although he proved to be loath taking unscripted questions from journalists as time went on. Petersen refused a request for an interview from the journalists Julian Sher and William Marsden, saying in an email: "No matter what I say, it always gets mixed up with dead babies". In a letter to the Ottawa Citizen, Petersen wrote that the Hells Angels were not a criminal organization, saying that being an Angel "is a fun and adventurous life that appeals to many...Bike clubs keep one young at heart. The Hells Angels and the biker sub-culture represent freedom and individuality...In a multicultural society such as ours, it is my opinion that no one person or group could possibly dominate the drug culture. Criminality is not a prerequisite to becoming a member. If a member engages in a criminal act he does so under his own volition and is subject to the laws of the land". Sher and Marsden mocked Petersen for this statement, writing in response: "After all, the local president of a Kiwanis Club or a local cycling team would hardly think there were even enough criminals in his or her group to spell out the rule that the crimes they committed were on their own time". In 2002, Petersen went to the Hells Angels' Canada Run hosted by Gerald Ward and was confronted in a hotel lobby in Niagara Falls by Sher and Marsden. He refused their request for an interview, saying: "Naw, I have nothing to say. Every time I talk to the media, it gets twisted". Petersen told the media that "as for drug shipments coming into Ontario, it's not been the Hells involved. Sher and Marsden noted that the secretary of Petersen's downtown Toronto chapter, Thomas Craig, was convicted of drug charges as a result of Project Shirlea.

On 8 April 2006, Petersen was asked by Peter Edwards, the crime correspondent of The Toronto Star, if the Hells Angels had anything to do with the Shedden massacre. Petersen in response was highly dismissive of the "Shedden 8" victims, saying: "One of the reasons we [Hells Angels and Bandidos] don't travel in the same social circles is that they don't have two nickels to rub together. There's nothing to take...None of them [the victims] had any prospect of being Hells Angels. Certainly, there were no overtures from this side...We never approached people to become members. People approach us".

The police informer David Atwell who knew Petersen well wrote: "...Donny is an eloquent speaker who can skillfully articulate his positions in just about any debate, even if he can fall into blatant narcissism from time to time". Petersen stood out in the Hells Angels in never having a criminal record. Atwell described Petersen as "...polite and well spoken... He didn't seem to espouse the virulent racism that was commonplace with bikers, he didn't seem to swear at all, and I never saw him stoned". Atwell called Petersen "a quick study and very smart".

As a man with no criminal record, Petersen was able to travel to the United States, Australia, and Europe, becoming the principal liaison between the Canadian Hells Angels and those elsewhere. Petersen stated: "There are European countries where we are literally looked on as gods. In Scandinavia we're revered, feared". Atwell stated that Petersen had an encyclopedic knowledge of motorcycles, writing that he knew more about motorcycles than anyone else he had ever met. Atwell stated that he never saw Petersen break any laws, through his police handlers believed that Petersen was guilty of "facilitating crime". Petersen's high-profile with the Toronto media made the police especially determined to have him convicted. In 2006, Petersen was charged as a result of Project Tandem due to the information provided by the informer Steven Gault, but the charges were dismissed. A number of Hells Angels were convicted as a result of Project Develop as the sting operation associated with Atwell was known, but Petersen was not one of those charged as Atwell failed to record Petersen doing anything illegal with the wire he was wearing. One policeman disagreed with the claims that Petersen was a law-abiding citizen, telling Langton: "He used to be one of the most badass bikers in Ontario. He just remade himself and revised his personal history." After Stadnick was convicted in 2004, Petersen emerged as one of the Angels principle Canadian leaders. Petersen told the media: "I'm not a criminal-never have been, never will be. So why should I be treated differently from anyone else? I'm not say we're all angels. We get unjustly accused of a lot of stuff. Society needs whipping boys". Petersen claimed that the Ontario Hells Angels had no connection to the Quebec Hells Angels, but Sher and Marsden wrote that he was lying as a number of trials and convictions showed that the Ontario chapters purchased their drugs from the Quebec chapters.

In April 2010, Petersen ceased to be the owner of Heavy Duty Cycles, but continued to work there as a "master builder". He continued to write articles and books on motorcycles and to appear in television documentaries, but gradually ceased his spokesman duties. Many journalists were disappointed that Petersen ceased to be the Hells Angels spokesman as he always provided a good news stories with his media appearances. He became the president of the downtown Toronto Hells Angel chapter and was described in his obituary as the "boss" of all the Hells Angels in the greater Toronto area. Petersen wrote 21 books and won the International Book Awards for 2012, 2013 and 2014 for his series Donny's Unauthorized Technical Guide. He died at his home in Oshawa while writing on his computer on 12 December 2021, aged 74.

== Books by Petersen ==
- Donny's Unauthorized Technical Guide to Harley Davidson 1936–2008: Volume I: The Twin Cam, i:Universe: Bloomington, Indiana, 2007, ISBN 0595439020
- Donny's Unauthorized Technical Guide to Harley Davidson 1936 to Present: Volume II: Performancing the Twin Cam, i:Universe: Bloomington, Indiana, 2008, ISBN 0595515169
- Donny’s Unauthorized Technical Guide to Harley-Davidson, 1936 to Present: Volume III: the Evolution: 1984 to 2000, i:Universe: Bloomington, Indiana, 2010, ISBN 1450208207
- Donny’S Unauthorized Technical Guide to Harley-Davidson, 1936 to Present: Volume V: The Shovelhead: 1966 to 1985 i:Universe: Bloomington, Indiana, 2012 ISBN 1475942842
- Donny's Unauthorized Technical Guide to Harley-Davidson, 1936 to Present: Volume IV: Performancing the Evolution, i:Universe: Bloomington, Indiana, 2014, ISBN 1491737298.
- Donny's Unauthorized Technical Guide to Harley-Davidson, 1936 to Present: Volume VI: The Ironhead Sportster: 1957 to 1985, iUniverse: Bloomington, Indiana, 2016, ISBN 1532008112.
- Biker 101: The Life Of Don: The Trilogy: Part I of III, Tellwell Talent: Victoria, British Columbia, 2018, ISBN 1775193020
- Biker 101: The Life of Don: The Trilogy: Part II of III, Tellwell Talent: Victoria, British Columbia, 2018, ISBN 0228805767
- Biker 101: The Life of Don – Trilogy Part III of III: True Tales of the Tales I Can Tell..., Tellwell Talent: Victoria, British Columbia, 2020, ISBN 979-8607745882.

== Books ==
- Atwell, David; Langton, Jerry (2017). The Hard Way Out: My Life with the Hells Angels and Why I Turned Against Them. Toronto: HarperCollins. ISBN 978-1443450409.
- Edwards, Peter (2010). The Bandido Massacre; A True Story of Bikers, Brotherhood and Betrayal. Toronto: Harper Collins. ISBN 978-0307372765.
- Langton, Jerry (2006). Fallen Angel: The Unlikely Rise of Walter Stadnick and the Canadian Hells Angels. Toronto: Harper Collins. ISBN 144342725X.
- Langton, Jerry (2010). Showdown: How the Outlaws, Hells Angels and Cops Fought for Control of the Streets. Toronto: John Wiley. ISBN 978-0470678787..
- Sher, Julian; Marsden, William (2003). The Road To Hell How the Biker Gangs Are Conquering Canada. Toronto: Alfred Knopf. ISBN 0-676-97598-4.
- Sher, Julian; Marsden, William (2006). Angels of Death: Inside the Bikers' Empire of Crime. Toronto: Alfred Knopf Canada. ISBN 9780307370327.
- Schneider, Stephen (2009). Iced: The Story of Organized Crime in Canada. Toronto: John Wiley & Sons. ISBN 978-0470835005.
