= AIH =

AIH or AiH may refer to:

== Codes ==
- Air Incheon (ICAO airline designator AIH)
- Ai-Cham language, ISO 639-3 code

== Medicine ==
- American Institute of Homeopathy (AIH), established in 1844, is the oldest extant national physician's organization in the US
- Autoimmune hepatitis, a human disease

== Others ==
- American IronHorse, an American motorcycle manufacturer
- As It Happens, a Canadian radio news program broadcast on CBC Radio One
