= Palos Verdes Concours d'Elegance =

The Palos Verdes Concours d'Elegance is an automotive concours held yearly at the Zamperini Field (formerly called the Torrance Airport) in Torrance, California. The show is unique in including both automobiles and vintage airplanes. The event was held at the Trump National Golf Course in Palos Verdes, California from 2007 to 2015.

The 2016 show was cancelled because of the decline in attendance as the 2015 show faced parking issues at the old venue. It was decided that the show would resume in 2017. On October 1, 2017, the show was resumed at a new venue, Torrance's Zamperini Field.

On September 30, 2018, the show celebrated its 25th anniversary.
