= Misselwood Concours d'Elegance =

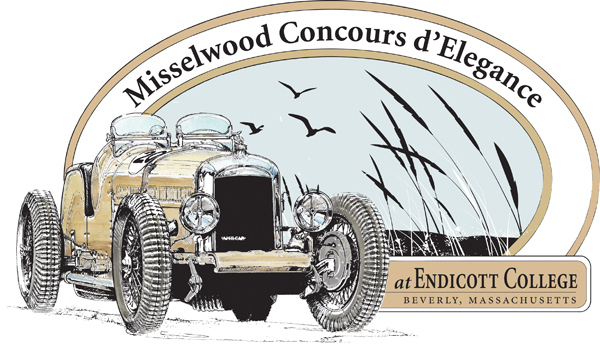
Misselwood Concours d'Elegance logo

The Misselwood Concours d’Elegance is an American classic car and motorcycle event that takes place on the last weekend in July at the Misselwood Estate, in Beverly, Massachusetts, and has been referred to as one of the most scenic classic car events on the East Coast and New England region. The event is a fundraiser for scholarship funds for Endicott College.

A Concours d’Elegance (from French meaning a competition of elegance, lit. "concourse of elegance", referring to the gathering of prestigious cars) dates back to 17th Century French aristocracy, who paraded horse-drawn carriages in the parks of Paris during summer weekends and holidays.

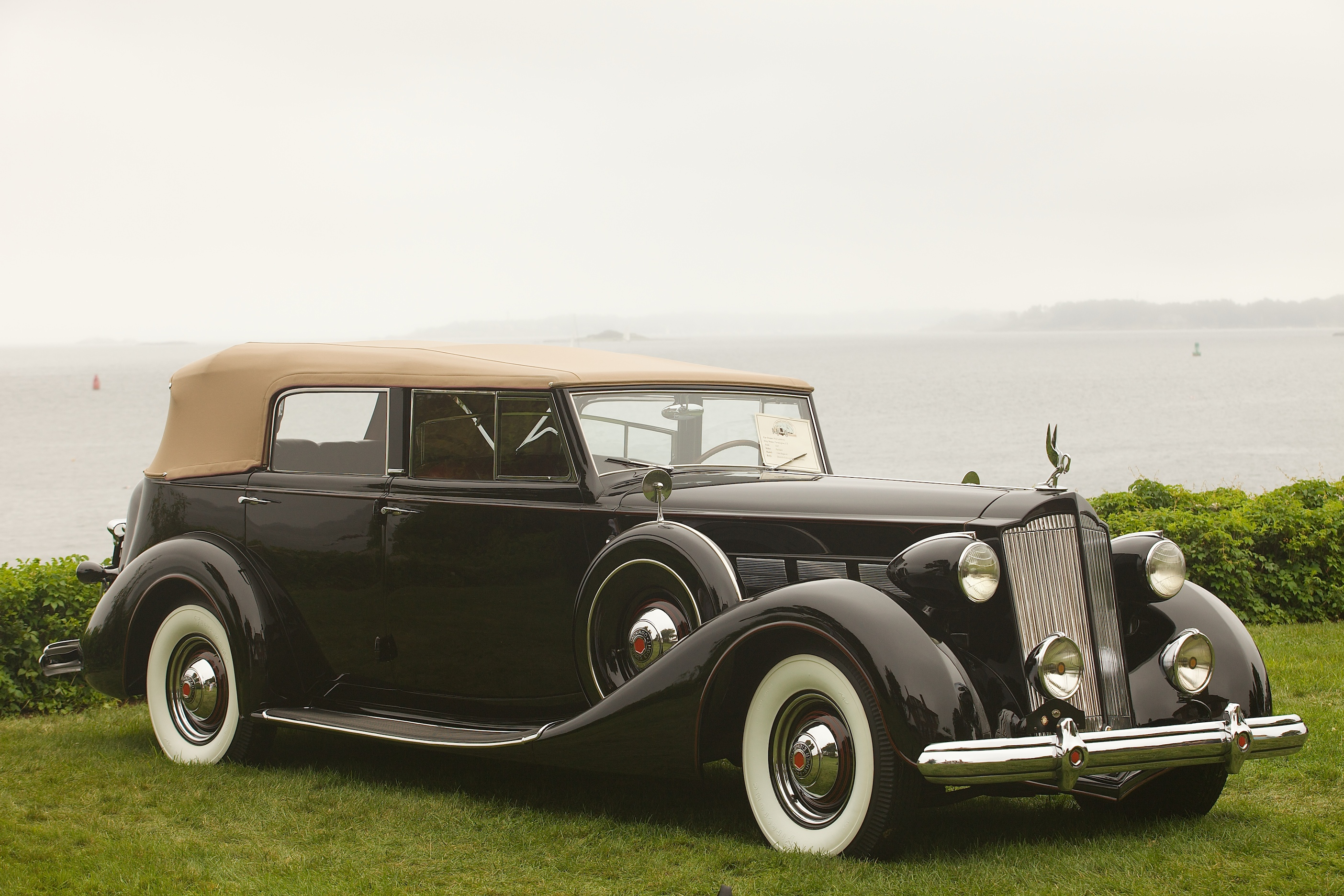
1937 Packard overlooking the Atlantic

== History ==
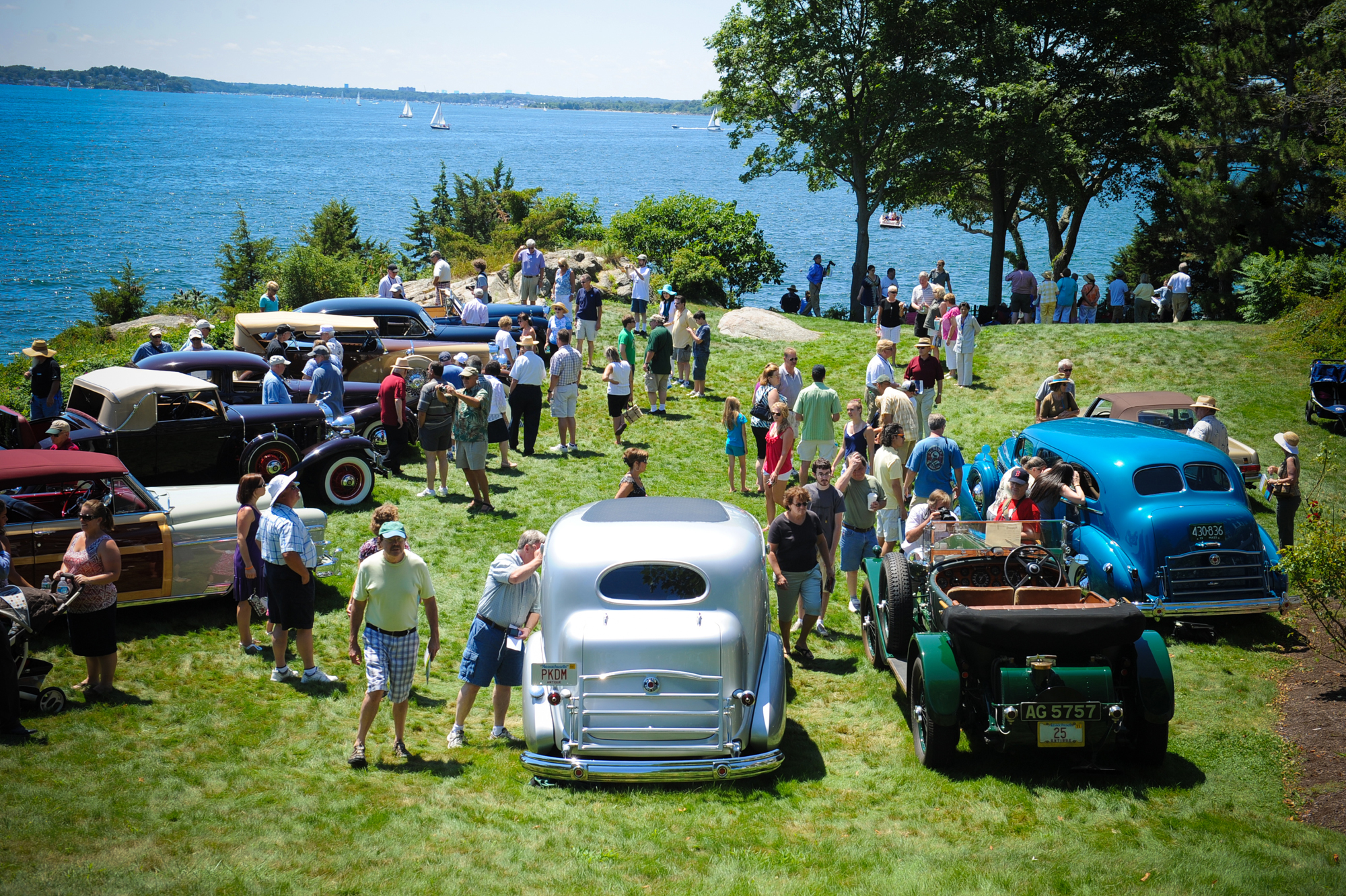
Spectacular vistas make the Misselwood Concours d'Elegance unique in its kind

Founded in 2009 by Patrick Cornelissen, the inaugural event took place in the summer of 2010 as the North shore Concours d’Elegance, and attracted 1,000 spectators and around 65 concours cars. Nowadays, the Misselwood Concours d’Elegance draws spectators and automobiles from all over the United States.

For the 2011 edition, the show moved to its current fixed date of the last weekend in July. That year the show also added a non-judged collector field, in addition to the established concours field.

After the 2012 edition, the show was renamed Misselwood Concours d’Elegance as homage to the extraordinary oceanfront property once owned by Susan B. Cabot, a Boston Brahmin – one of the “first families of Boston”.

In 2012 a partnership was formed with the Essex National Heritage Commission to help support a Tour d'Elegance, which takes place on the Saturday preceding the Concours d'Elegance. Following the Essex Coastal Scenic Byway, the tour lets drivers explore the winding roads of Cape Ann, starting in Newburyport and ending at the Misselwood Estate.

Shifting to a full weekend of events, a Tour d’Elegance, similar to the Pebble Beach Tour d'Elegance and the Road Tour organized at the Amelia Island Concours, was added in 2013. The inaugural event featured 80 vehicles, including a 1908 Stanley Model K from the Owls Head Transportation Museum, although a broken linkage rod ended the tour early for the caretakers.

2013 also welcomed record crowds and the concours field expanded considerably, opening up an extra show field next to its home at the Misselwood Estate. As one of only a few concours shows in the New England region, the Misselwood Concours provides an opportunity for the New England automobile community to congregate and showcase their exceptional vehicles.

Since 2014, the Misselwood Concours has continued to grow and provide scholarship funds for Endicott College students.

== Location ==
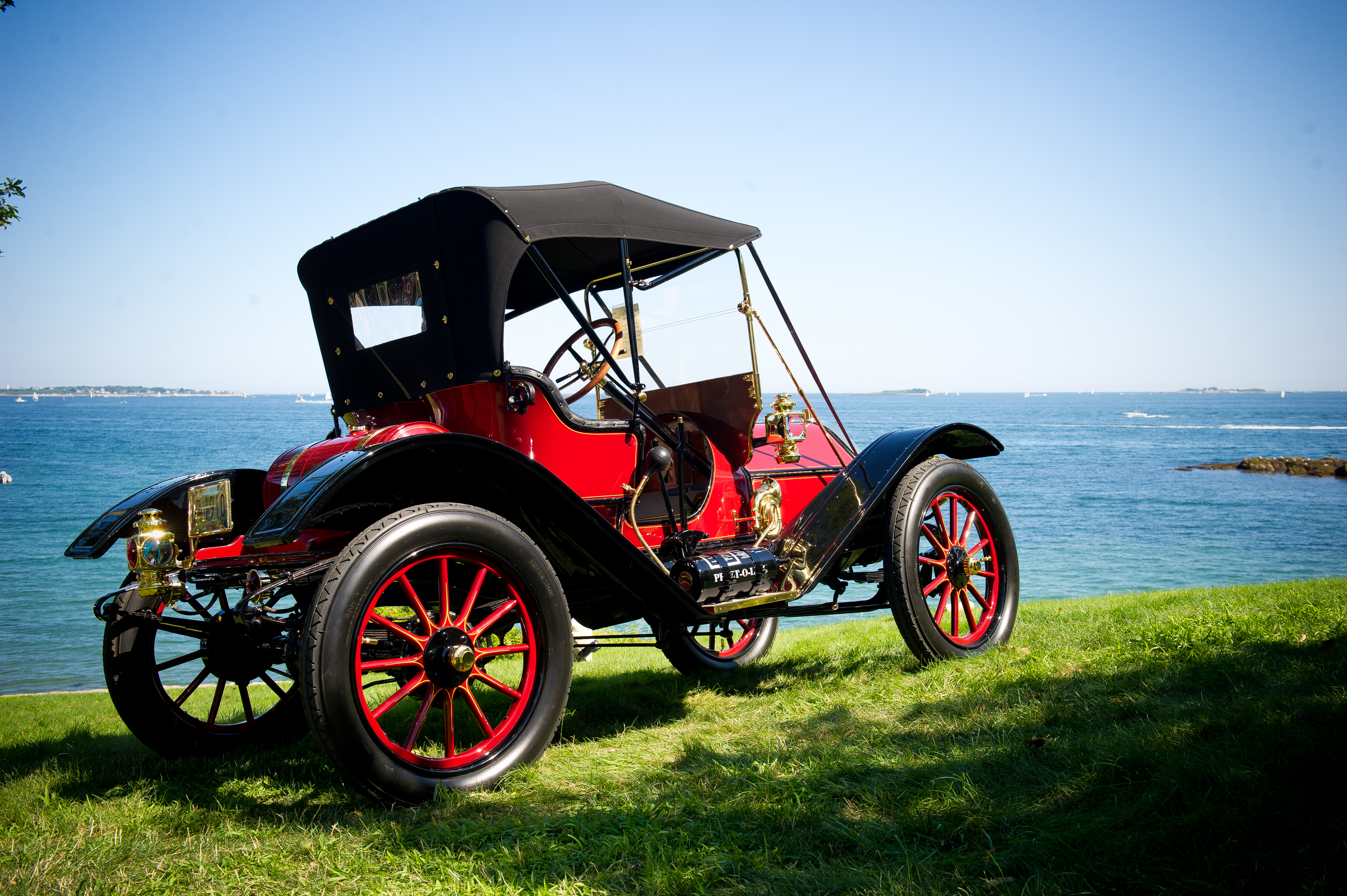
1910 Oakland overlooking the Atlantic Ocean

Located alongside the Essex Coastal Scenic Byway, on what was once known as Boston's Gold Coast, the Misselwood Estate sits on a small neck with views of Salem and Marblehead. Nearby Manchester-by-the-Sea is referred to as a playground for millionaires, and a favorite of the diplomatic community. Endicott College is the owner of the Misselwood Estate. The location and event has been noticed as the East Coast's Mini Pebble, and is among the top concours shows in the United States.

== Awards ==
Since its inception, the head judging has been done by Bob DeSantis and Rick Beecoff who both had experience with the Castle Hill Concours and are regularly invited to judge at other shows.

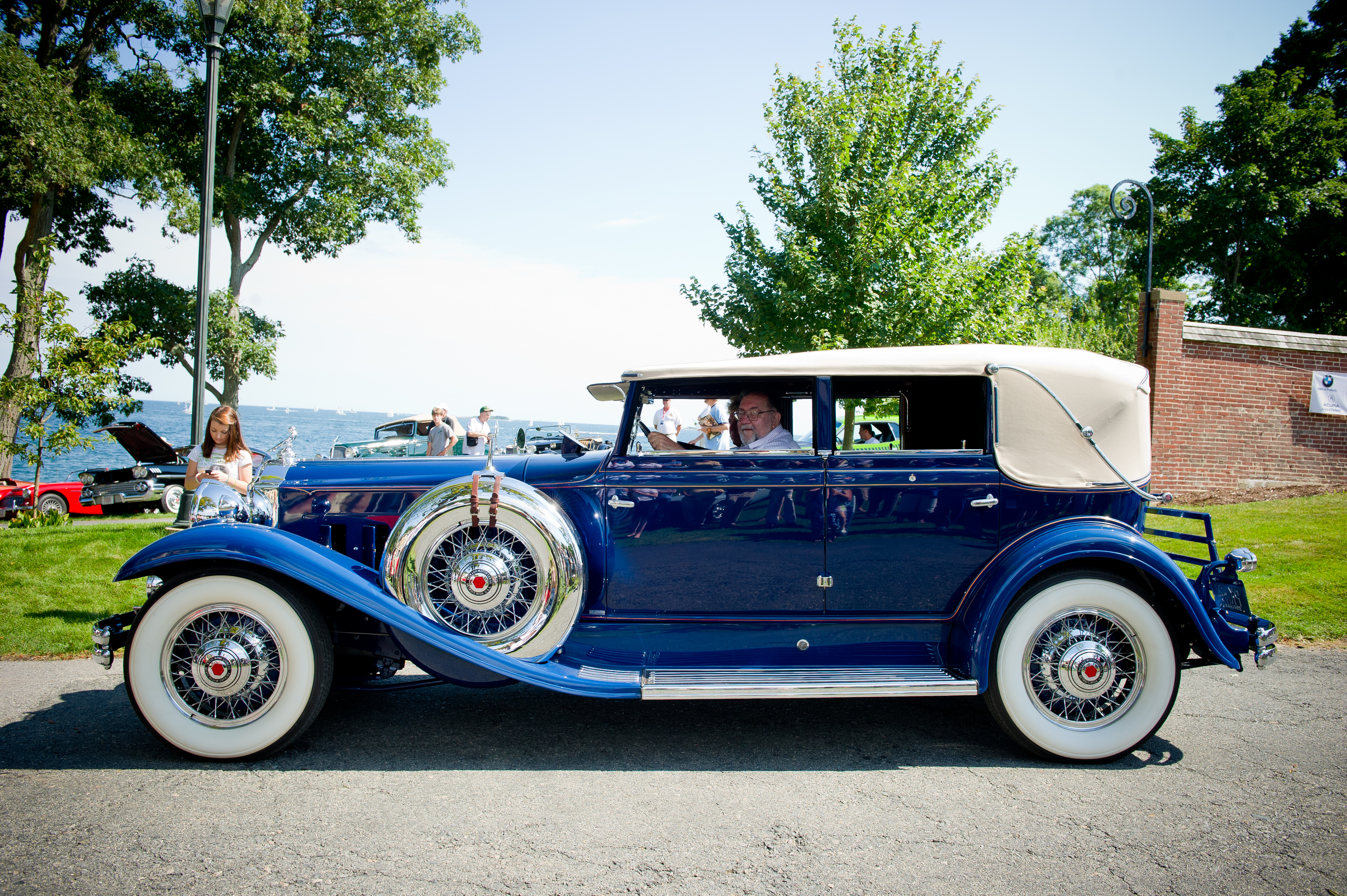
1931 Packard wins the 2010 Best of Show Award

Both automobiles and motorcycles compete for various class awards, yet ultimately compete for the coveted Ervin “Bud” Lyon III Best of Show award, named after the Ervin F. Lyon (1935-2012), an electrical engineer, one of the founders of the American Power Conversion Corporation and co-founder of the Lyon-Waugh Auto Group. In 2010, Bud's Book, author David E. Davis, outlined Lyon's passion for classic automobiles.

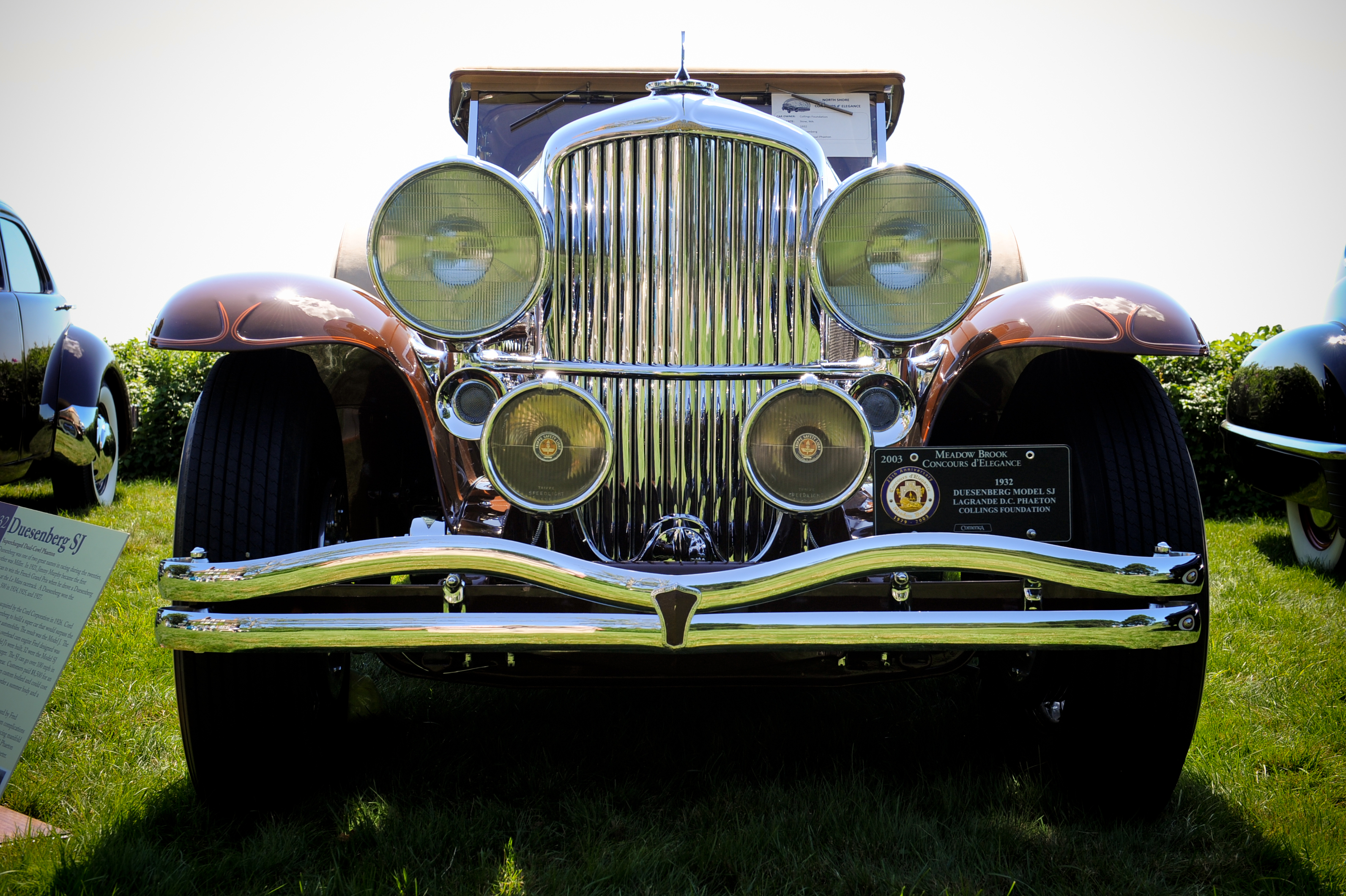
1932 Duesenberg was owned by Fred Duesenberg himself

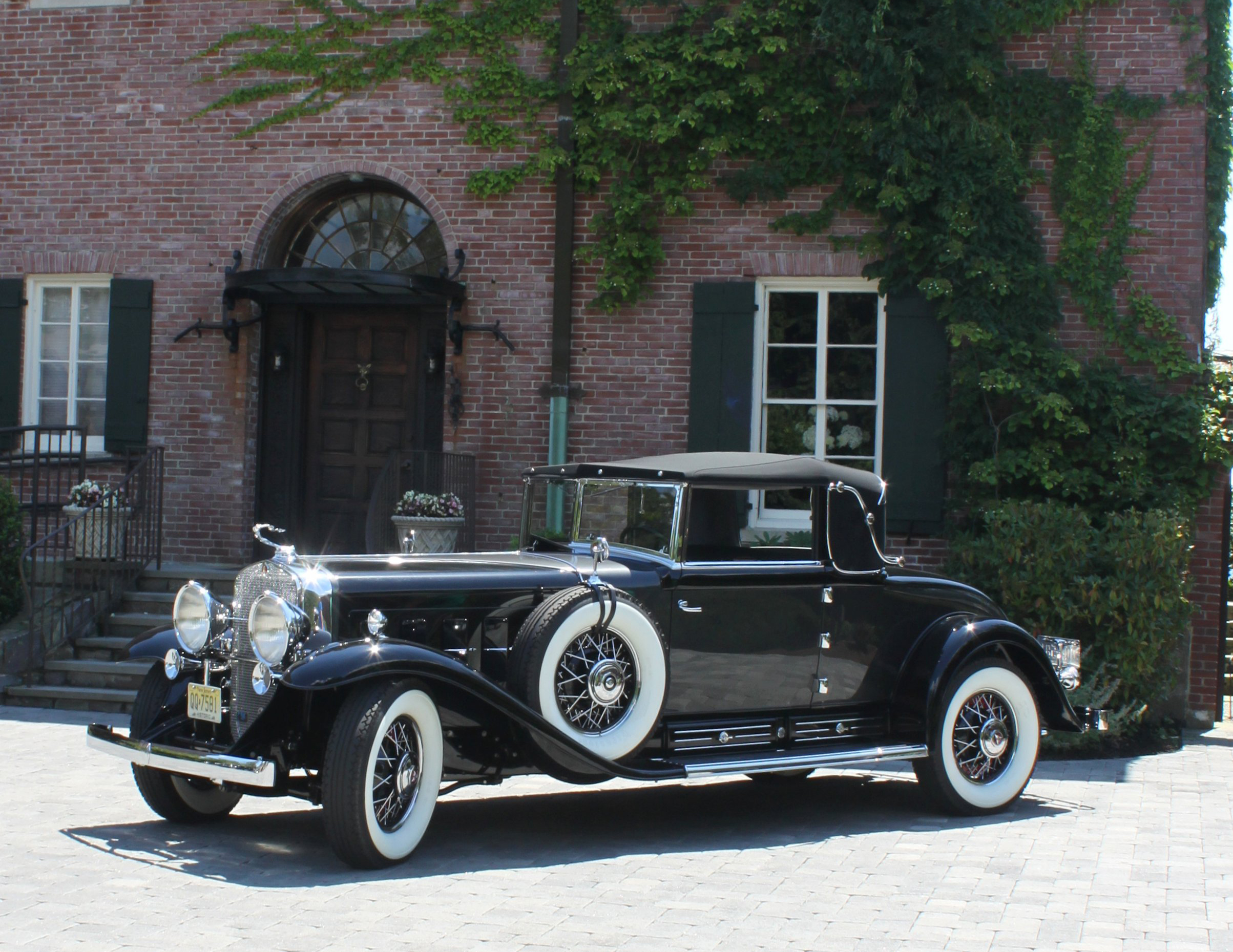
1931 Cadillac 16V Fleetwood 452A Convertible - 2013 Best of Show winner

=== Best of Show winners ===
- 2010: 1931 Packard 840 Dietrich Convertible, once owned by King Gustav of Sweden.
- 2011: 1932 Duesenberg SJ Dual Cowl Phaeton, owned by the Collings Foundation
- 2012: 1948 Delahaye 135M Figoni et Falaschi, owned by Bruce Male
- 2013: 1931 Cadillac 456A, owned by Charlie and Cheryl Eggert
- 2014: 1914 Locomobile Berline, owned by former olympian Bill Alley
- 2015: 1913 Rolls-Royce Silver Ghost, owned by Norm and Molly Shanklin
- 2016: 1954 Cunningham C-3, owned by James W. Taylor
- 2017: 1914 Rolls-Royce Silver Ghost Alpine, owned by Norm and Molly Shanklin
