= Concours d'Elegance =

Vehicle display event

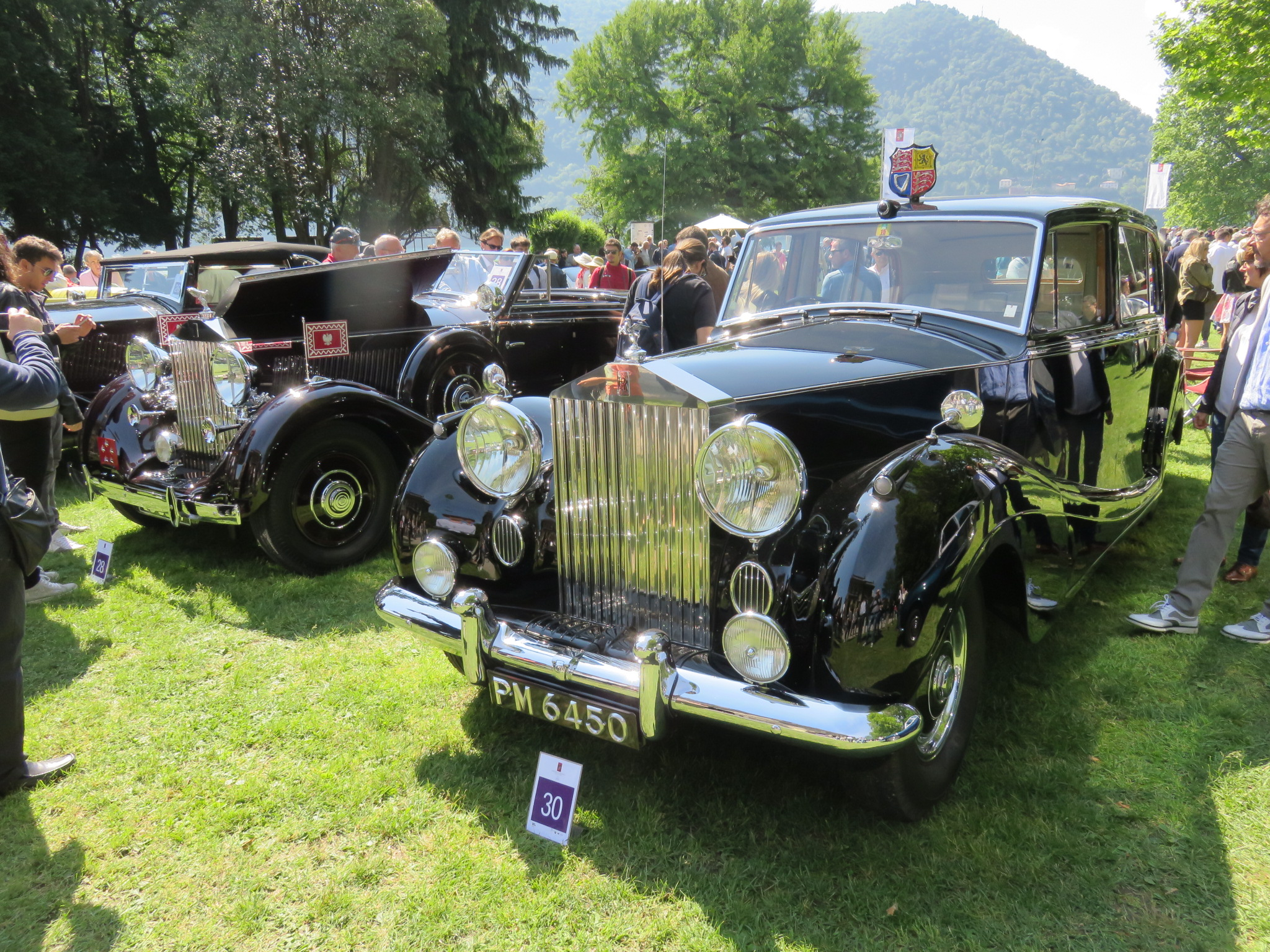
A 1954 Rolls-Royce Phantom IV exhibited at the Italian Concorso d'Eleganza Villa d'Este in 2015

Concours d'Elegance (French: concours d'élégance) is a term of French origin that means a "competition of elegance" and refers to an event where prestigious vehicles are displayed and judged. It dates back to 17th-century France, where aristocrats paraded horse-drawn carriages in the parks of Paris during summer weekends and holidays. Over time, carriages gave way to automobiles and the gatherings became a competition among vehicle owners to be judged on the appearance of their vehicles.

These events are often held at automobile shows, after racing competitions or, especially in the United States, as a fundraising event for charities. Many modern events also feature corporate exhibitions from luxury and sports car brands.

== History ==
The oldest still-extant Concours, the Concorso d'Eleganza Villa d'Este, is held annually near the Villa d’Este hotel in Cernobbio, on Lake Como in Italy. The first of these was held in September 1929. The first Concours in North America was held in 1950 (Pebble Beach Concours d'Elegance) at the Pebble Beach Golf Links in Monterey, California, in conjunction with the first Pebble Beach Road Race. The longest continually-running event is the Hillsborough Concours d’Elegance in Hillsborough, California, which has been held every year since 1956 (both Villa d'Este and Pebble Beach have skipped years since 1956).

== Judging ==
Numerous local organizations sponsor Concours events. Traditionally, vehicle judging at a Concours is more demanding than that of a local neighborhood or general automobile show. Trained judges examine the vehicle thoroughly. They rate each and every component. Only those vehicles that are judged perfect (or very nearly so) in every way are considered eligible for trophy class.

Often, the competitiveness of a Concours d'Elegance forces restoration of a vehicle to surpass "mint" condition. Mint condition would be the state of the vehicle when it originally left the factory. Concours-quality cars are often given upholstery, paint, plating, and mechanical restoration to a standard far exceeding that of the car when it was new.

Concours d'Elegance competitions also are run for classic cars. Here, the emphasis is as much on originality as the condition, although this also is very important. The general aim is to present a vehicle that is in the same, or better, condition than it was in when it left the production line. Unless original, modifications are not allowed, and components must be suitable for the year and model of the automobile. Even components or features fitted to automobiles of the same type, but in a different production year or trim level, are not allowed. Original-equipment accessories from the manufacturers' own range are allowed and some competitions allow after-market equipment and accessories, provided they are of the correct period. The automobiles must be presented in flawless visual condition, as with other Concours-grade cars.

== Events ==
Month	Location	Country	Event	Notes
February	Boca Raton, Florida	United States	Boca Raton Concours d'Elegance	
February	Karma Lakelands, Gurugram	India	21 Gun Salute International Vintage Car Rally & Concours Show	
February	Arrowtown, Queenstown	New Zealand	The Ayrburn Classic	
February	Ellerslie, Auckland	New Zealand	Ellerslie Car Show & Concours d'Elegance	
March	Sydney, NSW	Australia	Sydney Harbour Concours d'Elegance	
March	Amelia Island, Florida	United States	Amelia Island Concours d'Elegance	
April	La Jolla, California	United States	La Jolla Concours d'Elegance	
April	Montgomery, Texas	United States	Concours d'Elegance of Texas	
April	Japan (Various)	Japan	Concorso d'Eleganza Japan	
May	Lake Como	Italy	Concorso d'Eleganza Villa d'Este	
May	St. Augustine, Florida	United States	Riding Into History	
May	Montreal, Quebec	Canada	Concours Royalmount	
May	Balatonfüred	Hungary	Balatonfüred Concours d'Elegance	
June	San Marino, California	United States	San Marino Motor Classic	Successor to the Los Angeles Concours d’Elegance
June	Hillsborough, California	United States	Hillsborough Concours d'Elegance	The longest continually-running Concours d'Elegance in the world
June	Greenwich, Connecticut	United States	Greenwich Concours d'Elégance	
June	Coppet, Vaud	Switzerland	Swiss Elegance Concours	
June	Cincinnati, Ohio	United States	Cincinnati Concours d'Elegance at Ault Park	
June	Hershey, Pennsylvania	United States	The Elegance at Hershey (at The Hotel Hershey)	
June	London	United Kingdom	London Concours	
June	Chichester	United Kingdom	Cartier Style et Luxe	
June	Piešťany	Slovakia	Piešťanské zlaté stuhy – Concours d´Elegance	
July	England, UK	United Kingdom	Festival of the Unexceptional	A Concours d'Elegance-style event for classic cars considered to be 'ordinary' at the time of their manufacturing
July	Forest Grove, Oregon	United States	Forest Grove Concours d'Elegance	
July	Plymouth, Michigan	United States	Concours d'Elegance of America at The Inn at St. John's	Formerly Meadow Brook Concours d'Elegance
July	Northville, Michigan	United States	Northville Concours d'Elegance at Mill Race Historical Village	First youth-focused Concours d'Elegance event in the nation
July	Dyck Castle, Germany	Germany	Masterpieces & Style	
July	Massachusetts	United States	Misselwood Concours d'Elegance	
July	Lexington, Kentucky	United States	Keeneland Concours d'Elegance	
August	Pebble Beach, California	United States	Pebble Beach Concours d'Elegance	Most famous Concours d'Elegance event
August	Zurich	Switzerland	Concours d'Elegance "Zurich Classic Car Award"	
August	South Bend, Indiana	United States	Concours d'Elegance at Copshaholm	
September	Hampton Court Palace	United Kingdom	Concours of Elegance	
September	Keszthely	Hungary	Festetics Concours d'Elegance	
September	Old Westbury, New York	United States	Great Marques Concours d'Elegance	
September	Palace Schwetzingen	Germany	Classic-Gala Schwetzingen	
September	Kemble, Ontario	Canada	Cobble Beach Concours d'Elegance	
September	Oxfordshire	United Kingdom	Salon Privé	
September	Redondo Beach, California	United States	Palos Verdes Concours d'Elegance	
September	Nairobi	Kenya	CBA Africa Concours d'Elegance	
September	Dayton, Ohio	United States	Dayton Concours d'Elegance	
September	Philadelphia, Pennsylvania	United States	Radnor Hunt Concours d'Elegance	
September	St. Michaels, Maryland	United States	St. Michaels Concours d'Elegance	
September	Chantilly	France		
October	Padova	Italy	Stelle sul Liston Concours d'Elegance	
October	Newport, Rhode Island	United States	Audrain's Newport Concours & Motor Week	
October	Chattanooga, Tennessee	United States	Chattanooga Motorcar Festival	
October	Manhasset, New York	United States	Americana Manhasset	
October	Adelaide, South Australia	Australia	Bay to Birdwood	
October	Melbourne, Victoria	Australia	Motorclassica: The Australian International Concours d'Elegance and Motor Show	
October	Knokke-Heist	Belgium	Zoute Concours d'Elegance	
November	Las Vegas, Nevada	United States	Las Vegas Concours d'Elegance	
November	Hilton Head Island, South Carolina	United States	Hilton Head Island Concours d'Elegance & Motoring Festival	
December	Tampa, Florida	United States	Gasparilla Concours d'Elegance	
