= PrettyLitter =

American cat litter producer

- Company type: Private
- Industry: Cat Litter; Cat food
- Founded: 2015; 11 years ago
- Founders: Daniel Rotman
- Headquarters: Los Angeles, California, U.S.
- Parent: Mars
- Website: prettylitter.com

PrettyLitter is an American pet wellness company based in Los Angeles, that produces lightweight crystal-based cat litter that is designed to react to a cat's urine to indicate potential health problems by changing color based on the acidity, alkalinity or the presence of blood in a cat's urine. PrettyLitter also produces health-focused cat food. In May 2021, PrettyLitter was acquired by Mars for a reported $1 billion.

== History ==
PrettyLitter was founded in 2015 by Daniel Rotman who graduated from the University of California, Berkeley, and received his master's degree from Harvard University where he was a Fellow for the Center for Public Leadership. Rotman has previously worked for the U.S. Congressional Chair of the United States House Committee on Foreign Affairs. The idea of PrettyLitter was born after the passing of Rotman's cat, Gingi, where he discovered there were no at-home tools to help detect cats' potential health issues.

In 2015, PrettyLitter participated in the Startup U competition led by a 7-week reality television series that premiered on ABC Family from August to October 2015. As one of the finalists for Startup U, Rotman officially started PrettyLitter from his apartment after completion of the show in late 2015.

It is reported that Mars acquired PrettyLitter for more than $1 billion.
