= American Iron Magazine =

- American Iron Magazine, cover dated May 2007
- Editor in Chief: Buzz Kanter
- Categories: Motorcycling
- Frequency: Monthly
- Publisher: TAM Communications, Inc
- First issue: March 1989
- Country: United States
- Based in: Stamford, Connecticut
- Language: English
- Website: aimag.com
- ISSN: 1059-7891

American Iron Magazine was a Stamford, Connecticut based American motorcycle magazine specializing in the coverage of American-made motorcycles including Harley-Davidson, Indian and Big Dog Motorcycles. American Iron Magazine (or AIM) contained columns by Editor-in-Chief Buzz Kanter, Editor Chris Maida succeeded by Editor Steve Lita, and female motorcyclists Tricia Szulewski who also served as Creative Director, Genevieve Schmitt, Cris Sommer-Simmons, Marjorie Kleiman, and Stephanie Feld, as well as standard tech articles by featured writers Donny Petersen and Tom Johnson, plus skills and safety articles by Don Gomo. Typical articles included how-to stories on motorcycle repairs and maintenance, classic bikes, custom builds, motorcycle reviews, motorcycle product/accessory reviews, events, the Hog Helpline for tech questions, and recommendations on routes for motorcycle enthusiasts.

Launched in 1989 in California, the American Iron Magazine was purchased by magazine publisher Buzz Kanter and his TAM Communications in 1991 and moved to Connecticut, until it ceased publication in July 2020.

In 2008 the staff of American Iron Magazine launched an on-line version for classic motorcycle enthusiasts named Classic American Iron Magazine. Limited to topics related to American made motorcycles pre-1984, Classic American Iron Magazine features an on-line magazine format as well as an active bulletin board forum.

American Iron Magazine had several sister publications, including consumer-oriented magazines such as RoadBike, a print magazine in similar style focused on the motorcycle cruising market, Classic American Iron Magazine, an on-line magazine focused on classic American motorcycles like Harley-Davidson, Indian, Excelsior and others, and special print editions, such as American Iron Salute, that contained articles related to the American military and American Iron Garage, which focused on the technical aspects of American motorcycles. Another sister publication, industry-oriented magazine American Iron Retailer, with Editor Marjorie Kleiman at the helm and, in its final year, Bill Wood, was published from 2004 through 2008.
