= David Atwell =

Canadian outlaw biker and police informer

- Born: 1965 (age 60–61); Scarborough, Ontario, Canada
- Occupations: Outlaw biker; gangster; bouncer; police informer
- Years active: 1998–2007
- Known for: OPP informer within the Hells Angels
- Allegiance: Para-Dice Riders MC (1998–2000); Hells Angels MC (2000–2007)

David Atwell (born 1965) is a Canadian outlaw biker, gangster and police informer who played a key role in the Ontario Provincial Police's Project Develop operation against the Hells Angels between 2005 and 2007.

== Early life ==
Atwell was born into a middle-class family in the Toronto suburb of Scarborough, Ontario and started to work as a bouncer in Toronto-area bars as a teenager. On 18 October 1983, Atwell started working as a security guard at the age of 18. His mentor was "Jim", a British immigrant and a former Royal Marine who flagged him as a "natural" for the security business, taking him under his wing to train him to be a bodyguard and a security guard. Atwell described "Jim" as a tough veteran of the Falklands War who had seen combat, and who taught him much about serving as a bodyguard.

Through his guard duties at the Falcon's Nest nightclub in the 1990s, Atwell came to know members of the Para-Dice Riders, a Toronto outlaw biker club, with whom he often socialized. Atwell became friends with one of their leaders, Thomas Craig aka "TC", whom he described as a man who "...liked to drink, liked to party and he liked to fight". Atwell was recruited into the Para-Dice Riders by their secretary Donny Petersen. Atwell described Petersen as a "quick study and very smart". Douglas Myles, the vice president of the Para-Dice Riders, stated he was willing to sponsor Atwell in as a new member, an important endorsement. In September 1998, he joined the Para-Dice Riders. He came to be known as "Shaky" because one Para-Dice Rider stated his chances of being successful were "shaky" at best. In September 1999, Atwell was promoted from being a "hang-around" (the lowest level in an outlaw biker club) to being a "prospect" (the second level).

== Hells Angels ==
=== Sergeant-at-arms ===
In 2000, Walter "Nurget" Stadnick, the national president of the Canadian Hells Angels, made an offer to most of the Ontario biker gangs to allow them to join the Hells Angels "patch for patch", allowing them to enter the Hells Angels with patches equivalent to their current patches. Atwell recalled about Stadnick's offer: "There was a vote, and 51 per cent of the Para-Dice Riders decided to join the Hells Angels. The other 49 per cent could remain Para-Dice Riders, and many did. My friends were part of the 51 per cent, so I went with them." On 29 December 2000, in a much publicized ceremony, most of the Ontario outlaw biker gangs such as Satan's Choice, the Vagabonds, the Lobos, the Last Chance, the Para-Dice Riders and some of the Loners travelled to Hells Angels' "mother chapter" clubhouse in Sorel, just south of Montreal to join the Hells Angels, making them at one stroke the dominant outlaw biker club in Ontario. As a result of the mass "patch-over" in Sorel, with 168 outlaw bikers becoming Hells Angels, the greater Toronto area went from having no Hells Angels chapters to having the highest concentration of Hells Angels' chapters in the world. Atwell got lost on his way to Sorel, and when he arrived was ordered by the Para-Dice Riders national president, John "Winner" Neal, to report to serve his new masters in the Hells Angels. Atwell described his role at the party as "...cleaning tables, getting drinks and food for the full patches". Atwell described the new Ontario Hells Angels as submissive to the long-standing Quebec Hells Angels with some even going so far as to affect French accents in an attempt to sound like the Quebec Angels.

Atwell stated about joining the Hells Angels: "I had my apprehensions, but I was told that nothing would change except the patches we wore on our backs. We didn’t have to kick up 10 per cent of our earnings. My sponsors at the Para-Dice Riders had to vouch for me, or else I never would’ve been accepted. I don’t have what it takes to become a member of an established chapter of Hells Angels". Atwell stated most of the Hells Angels had what he lacked, namely: "That predator instinct and natural criminality—people who can take advantage of things like the fentanyl epidemic in Canada. They’re feeding it."

As a result of the mass "patch-over", Ontario went from having no Hells Angels chapters to having 14 Hells Angels chapters. The two Para-Dice Rider chapters in Toronto both became Hells Angels chapters. In addition, the former Satan's Choice, Last Chance and Loner chapters all became Hells Angels chapters to give Toronto a total of six Hells Angels chapters. One of the new chapters was the Niagara chapter led by Gerald "Skinny" Ward, a man who did not know how to ride a motorcycle when he joined the Hells Angels, but the Niagara chapter came to be the richest Hells Angel chapters as Ward had something close to a monopoly on drug dealing in the Niagara peninsula. As Ward and his gang were not bikers, Stadnick's decision to allow them to join the Hells Angels caused some tension, requiring Stadnick to visit Toronto to resolve the dispute. Atwell stated that he last spoke with Stadnick while serving as a guard at that meeting, describing Stadnick as cordial, but very cagey and careful about what he said.

Atwell described the life of a Hells Angel as one of privilege, stating: "Being a Hells Angel is not like being a normal person. You get treated differently by everyone, and you get used to it pretty quickly. If I went to any bar in Scarborough, there would be no doubt that I was not going to wait in line, that there was always a great seat empty for me and that there would be a cool beer on the table before my butt hit the seat cushion. Of course, there was never any talk of me paying for anything. I couldn’t have if I tried. My patch was like an entry pass for anything I wanted, a credit card I never had to pay off. But not all the attention Hells Angels get is positive. My weekdays were spent rolling around Scarborough like some kind of nobleman visiting the village paupers in my domain. That’s really what it felt like, because that’s really how people treated me...The club doesn’t just take over your life, the club is your life. Being a Hells Angel is not like any other career, because there is no off switch. Even when you’re not with the club, you’re doing something related to the club. You’re a Hells Angel 24/7, and the people close to you just have to put up with it"

On 4 April 2002, he was arrested by the Toronto police after selling drugs to a woman who turned out to a police informer, leading him to be charged with drug dealing, forcing him to live on bail for the next twenty months, during which he incurred large legal debts and was forced to live with his father to save money. Though the charges were ultimately dropped, he was left deeply in debt, all the more as he was fired from the security company that was employing him in 2004 after it was established that he was a Hells Angel following a security check by the Royal Canadian Mounted Police (RCMP) on the guards scheduled to be present at an event attended by Prime Minister Paul Martin. The RCMP told Intercon Security that it was unacceptable for a Hells Angel like Atwell to be serving as one of the guards to be present at the speech to be given by Martin, leading Intercon to terminate Atwell's employment immediately as the company did not wish to lose its contract with the federal government. The drug charges were stayed in February 2004 when a judge ruled that police had not obtained a proper warrant for the bug that recorded him selling the drugs. Atwell rose up the ranks of the Hells Angels Downtown Toronto chapter to become the sergeant-at-arms, and a "full patch" Angel (the highest level in an outlaw biker club).

During this time, Atwell started to become disenchanted with the general amorality and selfishness within the Hells Angels, writing in 2017: "I was free, but I wasn’t really. After the arrest, I began to see the club in an entirely different perspective. The guys weren’t Hells Angels because they wanted to ride bikes and have a good time together; they were all in it for themselves. TC’s insatiable greed had gotten us all in big trouble, and when it did, every guy just seemed to want to take the easiest way out, no matter who got hurt...And as soon as the charges against me were stayed, I was expected to go back to work for the club — after all, they had essentially ruined my ability to work for anyone else — and pay a huge bill even before I got back to my job. I was trapped, not by bars, but by the limitations the club had put on me and my life...I wanted out. I knew it wouldn’t be easy. I couldn’t just quit. Then I would just be an ex-Hells Angel whose name had been in every newspaper. In the media, I was convicted. It didn’t matter that the charges were stayed. That might make looking for a job tough. I had no skills other than security, and nobody would hire me for that because of my affiliation with the club." Atwell was approached by RCMP officers who tried to recruit him as an informer, an offer he rejected. Afterwards, two officers from the OPP's Anti-Biker Enforcement Unit approached him with an offer that interested him.

=== Project Develop ===
In March 2005, he started to work as an informer, providing information to the police. In 2005, Atwell become a police agent informer for an operation the police called Project Develop, for which he was paid $1,850 a week by the police. In September 2005, a fellow Hells Angel approached him with a plan to kill a police informer, which led him to become a police agent informer (i.e. an informer with a formal contract giving him immunity and committing the police to pay him a certain sum of money in exchange for testifying in court). Atwell has stated that he became an informer for moral reasons, not financial, and that he only agreed to accept the money following advice from "Jim", his Royal Marine mentor that he would need the extra money while living in witness protection. Atwell started to work as an agent informer in September 2005. For his work as an agent informer, Atwell was paid about $450,000 by the OPP.

On 5 April 2006, while wearing a wire Atwell recorded Mehrdad "Juicy" Bahman of Richmond Hill talking to him about his collection of sub-machine guns. Bahman was an Iranian immigrant who had fought in the Iran-Iraq war of 1980-88 while being a successful wrestler who almost qualified for the Iranian Olympic team . Bahman's combat experience, expertise with guns and wrestling experience made him useful for the Angels to such an extent that they waived their usual whites only policy to allow him to join. Atwell described Bahman as "whatever you need, I can get it kind of guys" who could obtain whatever was asked of him for the right price.

Atwell's stress was increased later in April 2006 when Donny Petersen, the Para-Dice Rider secretary turned Hells Angels national secretary, learned from a police source that there was an informer among their ranks, starting the search for the "rat". Adding to his tension of his undercover work was that Petersen, together with Douglas Myles, the vice president of the downtown Toronto chapter, were two of his closest friends, giving him a strong sense of guilt as he recorded their conversations with them. Petersen had been the best man at Atwell's wedding while Atwell had served as the master of the ceremonies at Myles's wedding. On 31 May 2006, he recorded a discussion about which members of the Angels' Sudbury chapter would be accepted into the downtown Toronto chapter with the decision being that only Lorne Campbell was worthy to be included in the Toronto chapter. Atwell became friends with Campbell after he joined the downtown Toronto chapter, and in July 2006 spent a weekend at Campbell's cottage at Baysville in the Muskoka region where the two tried fruitlessly to fish for trout.

On 27 September 2006, an OPP report read: "Agent 3859 [Atwell] attends a Hells Angels meeting. Larry Pooler [a member of the Toronto chapter] tells the Agent about going to the Indian Reservation with Lorne Campbell and getting a whole bunch of cigarettes. He buys them for ten [dollars] and sells them for fifteen or twenty a carton". Atwell's wire also recorded the members of the Toronto chapter talked about a failed murder attempt, where the Mafiosi Pietro Scarcella hired Paris Christoforou, the sergeant-at-arms of the Angels London chapter, to murder a rival Mafiosi, Michele Modica. The murder attempt in a Toronto restaurant failed on 21 April 2004 with Modica escaping and with an innocent by-stander, Louise Russo, taking a bullet into her spine that left her paralyzed for the rest of her life. Atwell's wire recorded that Petersen and Campbell thought the incident had damaged the image of the Angels and further recorded Petersen as saying that Christoforou had beaten up Scarella in prison.

Making Atwell's work more difficult were the Project Tandem raids of 28 September 2006 as a number Hells Angels were arrested due to information provided by the informer Steven "Hannibal" Gault, the treasurer of the Oshawa chapter, leading to an intense atmosphere of paranoia. Atwell stated that he "never had much respect" for Gault, a man whom he greatly disliked. Atwell argued that he was different from Gault, whom he accused of becoming an informer "...to save his own skin and he was a real hardcore criminal-he had even bragged about killing people. I, on the other hand, was just trying get out of a life that had spun out of control".

The lifestyle of an informer was a very stressful one, leading Atwell to frequently abuse cocaine, for which was often scolded for by both his fellow Hells Angels and his police handlers. Atwell later testified about his cocaine use: "I was feeling very alone as an agent. I felt I had no friends. I let my guard down". Atwell later stated about the life of an informer: "It was torture. I lied from the moment I woke up to the moment I went to bed. My dad couldn’t know. My girlfriend at the time couldn’t know. I put on weight. I’d have to go out and gather evidence, then bring it back to the safe house. I’d take off my wires and we’d review hours of tapes to qualify conversations. My girlfriend suspected I was seeing someone else. It tore me apart. At one point, I had constant tremors and ringing in my ears." When Frank "Cisco" Lenti of the Bandidos shot and killed David "White Dread" Buchanan, the sergeant-at-arms of the Angels' West Toronto chapter on 2 December 2006, Atwell's notes stated: "Petersen says up until this happened he had a good relationship with Frank and that Frank saved his life once".

On 6 February 2007, while wearing a wire Atwell recorded a discussion with Campbell to plan to set up a meeting for him to buy cocaine with the intention of selling it. On 20 February 2007, Atwell recorded a discussion with Campbell about their plan to sell the cocaine he had purchased in Kitchener. On 23 February, Atwell recorded Campbell as saying that he had gone to Kitchener and sold all of the cocaine. As a result of information provided by Atwell, the police intercepted several shipments of GMB, the "date rape drug", from Vancouver to Toronto, placing Bahman into debt worth about $100,000 with Omid Bayani of the United Nations gang of the Lower Mainland together with Vincenzo Sansalone of Haney chapter of the Hells Angels, forcing several other members of the Angels downtown Toronto chapter to step in to bail out Bahman, who lacked the means to pay off his $100,000 debt on his own after the police seized the GMB shipments.

By February 2007, the Hells Angels were beginning to suspect that Atwell was an informer as Myles accused Atwell to his face of being an informer after the police seized several shipments of cocaine and GMB. Myles had a meeting with Atwell in his garage, saying he was suspicious of him because he was buying far too many drugs from far too many people at once than was strictly necessary, which were the classic signs of a police informer trying to incriminate as many of his accomplices as possible. When Atwell asked why he had not been killed if he was a suspected informer, he received the reply from Myles: "That's why we're here right now". Atwell recalled that he felt deeply terrified at that moment, knowing he was suspected of being an informer and that his fellow Angels were debating the merits of killing him. Atwell left the meeting feeling grateful that Myles had decided to talk to him instead of having him killed as his fellow Angels had wanted while feeling very troubled knowing his life was in danger. When he got home, he found himself consuming a massive amount of alcohol, feeling that his life was in balance. When Atwell worked his final shift as it turned out as a bartender at the downtown clubhouse, he noticed that there was a coldness to his fellow Angels despite their superficial attempts to be friendly as he noticed their smiles and jokes seemed a little too forced. The next morning, Atwell was ordered to go into witness protection by his police handlers, who suspected there was going to be a murder attempt against him at any moment.

On the basis of the information gathered by Atwell, the police ordered a series of raids on Hell Angels clubhouses across Ontario on 4 April 2007. One biker expert, Yves Lavigne, was not impressed with the Project Develop raids, saying: "Biker clubhouses have been raided for decades. They know not to keep guns, drugs or incriminating evidence there and none has ever been found in a clubhouse in this province. But it's good for the media, it's good for the cameras".

== Life in witness protection ==
In April 2007, on the basis of the information provided by Atwell, the police charged 31 Hells Angels with 169 criminal charges, plus seized drugs worth $3 million and property worth half-million dollars. At a trial that took place between September 2010 and May 2011 where Atwell was the star witness for the Crown, five Hells Angels including John "Winner" Neal, the president of the Downtown Toronto chapter, were convicted on charges relating to dealing in GHB and cocaine plus possession of illegal weapons, but all of the accused were acquitted on charges of belonging to a criminal organization. The trial began on 13 September 2010, and was to be one of the longest trials in Canadian history. In November 2010, Atwell took the stand as a witness for the Crown. Atwell was nervous on the stand, saying "I'm a...rat. I've got to be hiding for the rest of my life". Atwell's credibility as a witness came under challenge as one of the accused, Larry Pooler who was acting as his own lawyer, noted that Atwell while working as an informer had smashed up an automobile with a baseball bat to resolve a business dispute, painting Atwell as a violent man who had only turned informer to protect himself. The trial ended on 22 May 2011 with Neal, Bahman, and Myles convicted of trafficking in GMB, Campbell convicted of trafficking in cocaine, and Pooler convicted of the possession of an illegal weapon.

Since 2007, Atwell has lived in witness protection, which he described as psychologically difficult as: "It's a lonely life about moving around and not having any stability... What can I do? I can only imagine getting close to someone. If someone cares about someone, whether it's a friend, a platonic relationship, or an intimate one with the opposite sex, you can only go so far before that person who cares for you [asks] 'Well what happened before that? Where did you come from?' I can't share any of that with anyone". Apart from being lonely, Atwell stated life in witness protection is a life of endless paranoia as the Hells Angels are looking for him while there is always the danger of someone recognizing him and telling the Hells Angels where he is. Atwell has also stated that he has no control over his life as his police handlers decide where he is to live and work with no input from him.

In 2018, he served as a witness for the Crown in an attempt to seize three Hells Angels clubhouses in Vancouver, testifying that crimes were not supposed to be discussed within clubhouses, but fact were, saying: "You are right in the first part — that there’s a rule you shouldn’t talk about it. But criminal activity would get leaked to a meeting."

== Books ==
- Edwards, Peter (2013). Unrepentant The Strange and (Sometimes) Terrible Life of Lorne Campbell, Satan's Choice and Hells Angels Biker. Toronto: Vintage Canada. ISBN 9780307362575.
- Langton, Jerry (2010), Showdown: How the Outlaws, Hells Angels and Cops Fought for Control of the Streets, John Wiley & Sons, ISBN 978-0470678787
- Langton, Jerry (2017). The Hard Way Out: My Life with the Hells Angels and Why I Turned Against Them. Toronto: HarperCollins. ISBN 978-1443450409.
