= Phoebe Dunn =

American author and photographer

Phoebe Dunn (1914–1990) was an American author of children's literature. Dunn wrote at least 45 books.

She was also a photographer for local newspapers and advertising agencies.

Dunn died in January 1990 at the age of 74. She and her daughter Susan Hanson were on their way to visit Costa Rica to photograph the rainforests when their plane crashed outside Costa Rica, killing Dunn, her daughter, and 19 others.

== Partial Bibliography ==
- The Little Pig
- The Little Duck
- The Little Puppy
- The Little Rabbit
- The Little Lamb
- The Little Kitten
- Baby's Animal Friends
- Big Treasury of Little Animals
- Farm Animals
