= Big Dog Motorcycles =

Motorcycle manufacturer

Big Dog Motorcycles is a manufacturer of semi-custom, mid-priced motorcycles, based in Wichita, Kansas, United States. The company was founded in 1994, shut down in 2011, and recently reopened as Big Dog Is Back .

== History ==
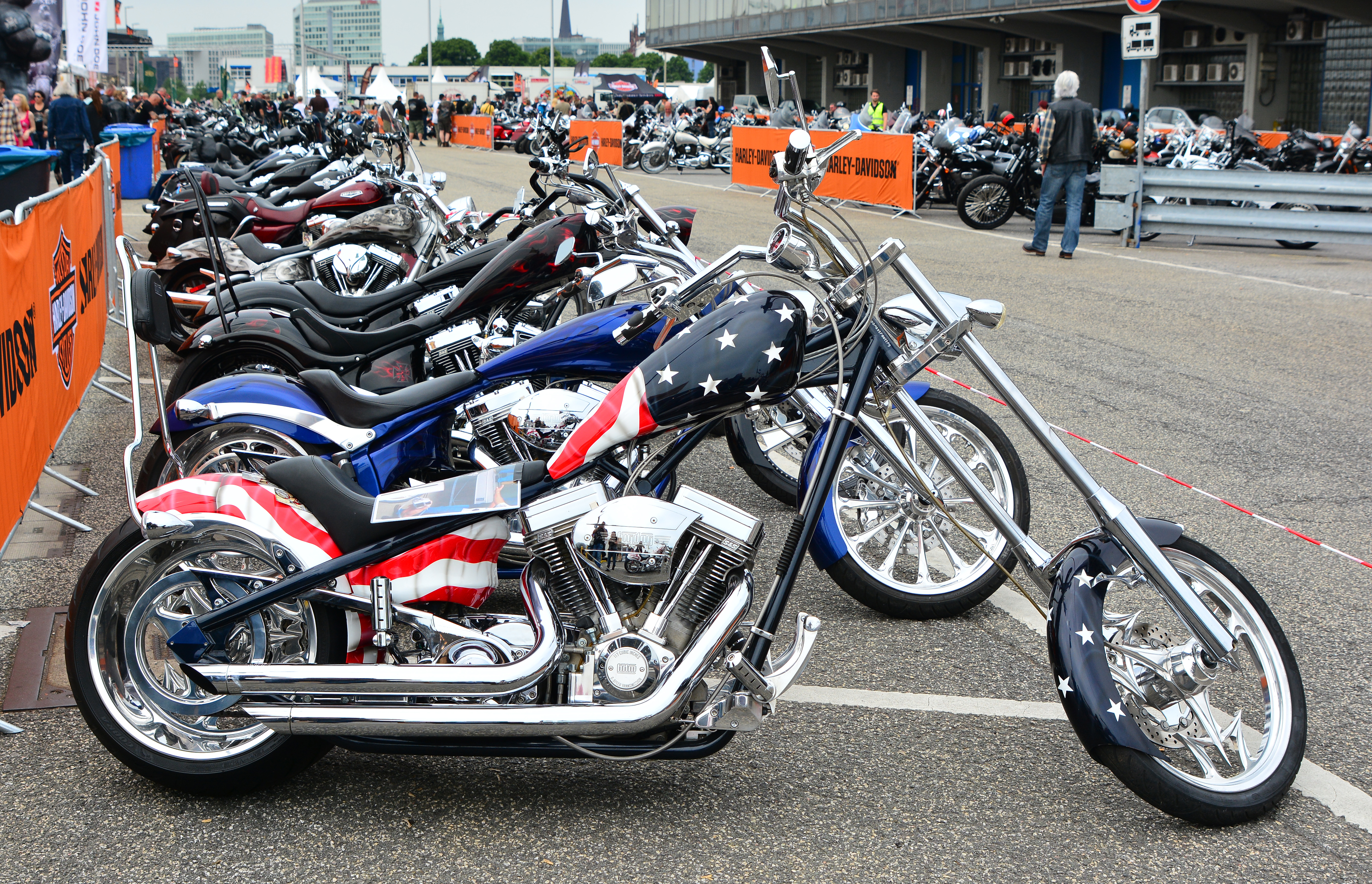
a row of Big Dog at the 2015 Hamburg Harley Days in Germany

The company was founded in 1995 by Sheldon Coleman Jr., whose father was Sheldon Coleman Sr., who had been president of Coleman Company. In 1994, Coleman started working in his garage to modify Harley-Davidson motorcycles. Big Dog produced a single motorcycle in its first year, affectionately known as "Old Smokey"; its oversized fenders and classic cruiser style would point the way for all of the company's later products. When the company was started, it initially produced its motorcycles largely from Harley-Davidson parts. By 1996, Big Dog had sold 100 motorcycles. By 1997, the company had reached $2 million in sales, and in 2000, the company had expanded so much that a move to a new, 110,000-square-foot (10,000 m^{2}) factory and world headquarters (since expanded to 175,000 square feet) was required. The company reached the peak of its success in 2005 at which it had made over 5,000 motorcycles, employed over 300 people, and brought in a revenue of over $120 million. According to The Dallas Morning News, that year, it and American IronHorse were "the two largest builders of manufactured exotics". In 2006, Big Dog manufactured its 20,000th motorcycle. In 2007, it laid off people for the initial time upon not selling the expected number of motorcycles.

In April 2011, Big Dog shut down. In October 2013, Intrust Bank filed for foreclosure on Big Dog property.
