= Steven Gault =

Canadian outlaw biker and police informer

- Born: 1973 (age 52–53); North Bay, Ontario, Canada
- Occupation: Outlaw biker
- Years active: 1990–2009
- Known for: High-profile informer within the Hells Angels
- Allegiance: Satan's Choice MC (1999–2000); Hells Angels MC (2000–2006)

Steven Gault (born 1973) is a Canadian outlaw biker and police informer who played a key role in the Ontario Provincial Police's (OPP) Project Tandem operation against the Hells Angels between 2005 and 2006.

== Informer ==
Gault was born in North Bay and dropped out of high school in grade 10. In 2008, Gault testified that he started working as a police informer in 1990 at the age of 17 as he became involved in various criminal activities while at the same time informing on his associates. Gault stated: "I was just providing information to them [the police] for money about drug dealing operations in the area". When asked by the Crown Attorney Mitchell Flagg "Other than the money, was there any other reason that you provided information to the police when you were a teenager?", Gault flatly replied "No". Gault was first convicted of a criminal offense at the age of 17.

Gault became a member, together with several of his relatives, of a nomadic band known variously as "the Travelers" or "the Wanderers" that operated in the rural areas of eastern Ontario targeting elderly farmers by engaging in home renovation scams. Gault testified in 2008 that he felt justified in targeting elderly farmers "because they have a lot of money". At the same time Gault informed on his associates in his band sometimes being paid $1,000 by the police for his information. But he testified that he informed on his brothers-in-law who were members of his band for free. Gault testified that knew what barns and homes he and his associates had worked on because the work done "was horrible". Besides specializing in cheating senior citizens out of their life savings, Gault bit off the ear of a man in a bar fight in Campbellford. About the ear-biting incident, Gault stated: "It was a consensual bar fight". Over the years, Gault has been convicted of multiple counts of fraud, assault and uttering death threats.

In 1996 Gault became involved with an 18-year-old woman named Linda Sebastiao, whom he started living with a month after they met, in 1997 he fathered a daughter by her. Sebastiao description of Gault was: "He was very charming and swept me off my feet." Sebastiao claims that Gault once cheated one elderly farmer by billing him for some $260,000 of home renovation work that was never done. Sebastiao stated she was well aware that Gault did not make his living honestly but "he gave us everything we wanted. Everything that we needed. We bought a nice, cute little place." However, as the years went on, Sebastiao alleges that her relationship with Gault moved into a darker direction as she stated that he became jealous, dominating, possessive, and brutal. Sebastiao alleges that Gault did not allow her to have a driver's license and that he frequently beat her, once because the toilet paper did not roll in a manner pleasing to him.

== Outlaw biker ==
In 1999, Gault was living in Northumberland County. Gault was working on a house in Warsaw, Ontario when he met a member of the Satan's Choice Motorcycle Club, William "Mr. Bill" Lavoie, by chance, and ending up befriending him. In the fall of 1999, Gault joined the Satan's Choice's Oshawa chapter. The club's rules required that a new member be sponsored by a member who had known him for at least five years; Gault's sponsor, Lavoie, had only known him for five months and had been bribed in the form of $12,000 by Gault to say otherwise. Gault joined Satan's Choice solely with the aim of selling information about the club to the police. Gault cultivated a bloodthirsty image. Boasting about he how had bitten off a man's ear, and adopted as his biker name "Hannibal". The nickname Hannibal was not a reference to the Carthaginian general, but rather to the fictional serial killer Hannibal "the Cannibal" Lecter. Gault cultivated a bloodthirsty image, claiming that the ear-biting incident had left him with a taste for human blood. Gault's ex-wife recalled: "When we would make him steak for supper, his was just with spices, raw, not even on the grill for a little".

The national president of Satan's Choice, Bernie Guindon, who lived and still does live in Oshawa, recalled about Gault: "He had a cocky attitude. That's what I got from him. I always had a gut feeling about him. The questions he'd be asking me. You always had to be careful how you answered him". Guindon was also suspicious of Lavoie, whom he suspected was a police informer, stating: "He hadn't worked, but he always had money. I always wondered where he got the money". Gault entered Satan's Choice as a "hang-around", the lowest level in an outlaw biker club and was promoted up to a "prospect", the second level in an outlaw biker club in late 2000. One Satan's Choice member, Lorne Campbell, stated that Gault would never nod his head until he had nodded his head first, which he found disconcerting. Campbell said of Gault: "He looked sneaky. He just didn't look right".

On 29 December 2000, Satan's Choice "patched over" en masse to join the Hells Angels and in this way, Gault became a Hells Angel. On that day, in a much publicized ceremony, most of the Ontario outlaw biker gangs such as Satan's Choice, the Vagabonds, the Lobos, the Last Chance, the Para-Dice Riders and some of the Loners travelled to Hells Angels' "mother chapter" clubhouse in Sorel-Tracy, northeast of Montreal to join the Hells Angels. Making them at one stroke the dominant outlaw biker club in Ontario. One police officer told the journalist Jerry Langton about the mass "patch over" in Sorel: "They [the Angels] were truly scraping the bottom of the barrel. They were trading patch for patch the legendary Hells Angel patch for some of the lowest of the low".

Gault testified that after joining the Hells Angels: "I contacted one of the officers I was providing information to...I told (the police) if I could make my way into the Hells Angels and make my way up to full patch, I would take down any drug dealers I could". In early 2002 Gault became a "full patch" Hells Angel, the highest level in an outlaw biker club, making him a member of the Hells Angel elite. Sebastiao stated: "After he got his full patch he thought he was king of the world." As a Hell Angel, Gault promoted the image of himself as being a "wild man." Waving about his handgun, showing off the newspaper reports about his assault conviction for the ear-biting incident, and hinting very strongly that he had committed a murder. The Hells Angel David Atwell who worked as a police informer described Gault as "...a real hardcore criminal-he had even bragged about killing people". The journalist Jeff Mitchell wrote: "His way of settling a beef was to throw the first punch and keep on throwing until he'd made his point: the new Angel once squared off against the Oshawa club's Sergeant At Arms, who serves as the charter enforcer." In outlaw biker clubs the office of sergeant-at-arms, who is in charge of enforcing discipline within the chapter, is generally held by the toughest member of the chapter. Gault later testified about his fight with Oshawa chapter's sergeant-at-arms: "I pretty much mopped the floor with him." Shortly there afterwards Gault became the treasurer of the Hells Angels' Oshawa chapter, making him in charge of the finances. Sebastiao states he became paranoid and had the windows of their house bricked in to reduce the chances of him being killed in a drive-by shooting.

In 2002 Gault was given a speeding ticket by the Durham Region police constable Todd Dennis. In response Gault began a campaign of harassment against Dennis and his family, stalking them and making threats. In October 2002 Gault was convicted of uttering death threats while Dennis secured a restraining order forbidding Gault from having contact with him and his family. In 2003 Sebastiao ended her relationship with Gault and publicly accused him of being a police informer. Sebastiao alleges that Gault neglected his family in favor of partying and cocaine use, became more abusive, and wanted to have an ex-girlfriend move in.

Another member of the Hells Angels' Oshawa chapter, Remond Akleh, believed Sebastiao's allegations that Gault was an informer and pressed for Gault to be expelled. Gault made aggressive use of the Angels' "arbitrations" (the internal tribunals to settle disputes between the club's members), denying the allegations and pressing for Akleh to be expelled instead. Gault convinced the other Angels in the "arbitrations" that he was not an informer and that Akleh was lying. In 2003 Sebastiao's family was awarded a restraining order against Gault after he was alleged to have threatened to kill them by blowing up their house with them in it. Sebastiao stated: "I was scared, scared of what he might do to me and my family; like what he had threatened." She alleges that Gault once threatened to kill her by stripping her naked, tying her to a tree in the forest, covering her with honey, and letting the animals and insects eat her alive.

=== Project Tandem ===
In April 2005 the OPP's Anti-Biker Enforcement Unit recruited Gault as a full-time agent source informer, signing a contract with Gault giving him immunity while paying him $1,900 per week and another $15,000 per month in a trust fund while also paying his income taxes. An informer is someone who provides information to the police, usually in exchange for money, but does not have to testify in court and does not enjoy immunity; by contrast, an agent source informer has a contract giving him or her immunity from past and future crimes and is guaranteed to be paid a certain sum of money as specified in the contract, in exchange for which the agent source informer must agree to testify in court. Gault was the key informer behind what the police called Project Tandem under which Gault was to wear a wire while conducting drug deals with various Hells Angels. Project Tandem was supposed to last only six months, but instead went on for 18 months until September 2006 as Gault collected more information than the police had expected about the Hells Angels. Gault was greatly disliked by his police handers, who felt he was the most unsavory of informers.

In 2005 Gault bonded with Gerald "Skinny" Ward, the president of the Angels' Niagara chapter, during a motorcycle ride to Prince Edward Island. Having gained his trust, Gault suggested Ward do business with him. Ward was close to having a monopoly of the cocaine trade in the Niagara peninsula and was well known in underworld circles for the high quality of his cocaine. The police estimated that Ward was responsible for about 75% of all the cocaine sales in the Niagara peninsula. On 18 August 2005, Gault visited Welland to meet Ward while wearing a wire and was recorded buying 1.1 kilograms of cocaine from Ward for $42,000 in cash. As Ward's cocaine was about 85-91% pure Gault joked while buying the cocaine "I never even tried it, I'm like, I'm trying not to touch it". On 5 October 2005 Gault visited Ward at his Wellland home, where he was recorded buying one kilogram of cocaine for $38,000 in cash. During his visits Ward talked frankly with Gault about his business, saying his chapter was supposed to have at least six members, as required by the Angel rules, but in fact had only three members as it was difficult to recruit "good guys". Ward told Gault that, despite the high price that he charged for his cocaine, he was not stocking up as he believed that the price would come down eventually, leading Gault to say that it was "playing the stock market". Ward replied: "Pretty well the same thing. You're up, you're down.". Between August 2005-February 2006, Ward sold Gault some $156,000 worth of cocaine.

One evening in April 2006, Gault unexpectedly arrived at Guindon's house talking about a vague offer to pay him 5,000 dollars in exchange for some unspecified project that Gault had planned. Guindon recalled: "He promised me five thousands dollars a month and I said no. I didn't know what he meant by 'work with him'. I just knew it would mean trouble." Distrusting Gault, whom he believed was setting him up for something, Guindon decided to retire from the Hells Angels the next day. Guindon turned in his Hells Angel patch which Gault, as the Oshawa chapter treasurer, burned.

As a result of Project Tandem, Gault ended up being paid about $1 million by the Ontario government. Gault is believed to have been the first full patch Hells Angel in Canada to wear a wire for the police. Gault later testified: "The whole idea of a patch and being a full patch member is that you can be 100-percent trusted. And you can do business with anybody and they're to trust you 100 percent and that's meaning business as in illegal business-drugs, stolen property, robberies-anything". Shortly before his death in a motorcycle accident on 7 September 2006 Lavoie had been expressing regret at having sponsored Gault in 1999, accusing him of being an informer. One Hells Angel, Lorne Campbell, has maintained that there was something suspicious about Lavoie's death. Claiming that Lavoie was a careful rider and that it was odd that police neither charged nor released the name of the driver of the car that killed Lavoie (the police have stated the identity of the driver was kept secret out of the fear that they might be killed by Hells Angels). Gault attended Lavoie's funeral on 13 September 2006 and has repeatedly denied in court allegations that he said at the funeral: "He's never smelled better".

When the Project Tandem raids were launched on 28 September 2006 the police arrested 27 people including 15 full patch Hells Angels. As a result of Project Tandem the police seized $417,100 Canadian dollars and another $6,914 American dollars from various Angel clubhouses in Ontario. Along with drugs worth 2.9 million Canadian dollars including 13 kilograms of cocaine, 50 pounds of marijuana, 50,000 tablets of ecstasy, and two kilograms of methamphetamine. Perhaps more damaging was the fact that a "full patch" Hells Angel had worked as a police enforcer, leading to an atmosphere of paranoia within the Hells Angels as to who else might be an informer. On 28 September 2006, two Hells Angels, Remond "Ray" Akleh of Ottawa and Mark Stephenson of Oshawa were charged with ordering Gault to kill Frank Lenti, the national president of the Bandidos. Akleh had moved to Ottawa to get away from Gault, a man Akleh greatly disliked and with whom he had been feuding with ever since he accused him of being an informer in 2003. Stephenson was the president of the Hells Angels Oshawa chapter. Gault described in lucid detail a plan to kill Lenti and leave his corpse hanging out in public as the police notes state: "It was proposed that the agent kill Lenti and leave him in the middle of the highway in his [Bandidos] colours. Lenti couldn't just disappear; he had to be found to prove a point".

== Witness for the Crown ==
Gault served as the star witness for the Crown in the various trials that resulted from Project Tandem in 2008 and 2009. On 11 May 2008, Gault served as a witness for the Crown at the double murder trial of James Boudreau in Coburg. On 26 May 2008, Boudreau was convicted of one count of first degree murder and another count of second degree murder. At the trial of Akleh and Stephenson in 2008 in Whitby, Akleh testified it was Gault who approached him when he arrived unannounced at his Ottawa house about killing Lenti, stating he wanted nothing to do with the alleged murder plot or Gault. On 7 November 2008, the Crown's case against Akleh and Stephenson collapsed when Akleh revealed to the court he had been a police informer since 2003 and there never was a murder plot against Lenti. Gault appeared to be very surprised to learn that Akleh was also an informer, saying in the courtroom: "You've got to be kidding me". Akleh testified he had become an informer out of fear of Gault, saying that Gault was harassing him and his family and making death threats. Akleh stated that despite being a Hells Angel that he befriended Constable Denis as both men and their families were being harassed by Gault, which led him to become an informer. Unlike Gault, Akleh did not receive any monetary compensation from the police for his information.

Akleh's lawyer, Glenn Orr, argued very forcefully that only "an imbecile or a moron" would try to recruit a man whom he already accused of being an informer to serve as a hitman. Orr called Gault "the Wayne Gretzky of lying", saying in his closing comments to the jury that Gault was a deeply dishonest man whose word could not be trusted. Akleh further testified that his long-standing feud with Gault made it very unlikely that he would try to recruit him as a hitman while Stephenson testified he had been feuding with Gault ever since he suggested he was not intelligent enough to serve as the treasurer of the Oshawa chapter. The fact that Gault despite wearing a wire did not record either Akleh or Stephenson saying anything about wanting to kill Lenti was a further blow to his credibility; Gault maintained that Akleh and Stephenson had indicated via hand gestures that they wanted him to kill Lenti. On 18 January 2009, Akleh and Stephenson were acquitted of conspiring to murder Lenti with the jury ruling that Crown's case rested entirely on the unreliable word of Gault.

In February 2009, Terry Pink, the president of the Angels' Simcoe County chapter, was convicted of selling 8,340 ecstasy tablets to Gault. On 25 March 2009, Ward was convicted of drug dealing and living off the proceeds of crime, becoming the most high-profile Hells Angel to be convicted as a result of Project Tandem. Another Hells Angel turned informer, David Atwell, later testified that pictures of Gault were to be found in every Angel clubhouse with the words "liar" and "rat" written across them. Ultimately, 21 Hells Angels were convicted of various drug, weapons, and membership of a criminal organization charges brought about in connection with Project Tandem. On 12 April 2009, a television documentary about his life entitled Project Gault aired as part of the television series Outlaw Bikers. Gault is living in witness protection under a pseudonym in an unknown location.

In June 2010, the Ontario Criminal Injuries Compensation Board ordered Gault to pay Sebastiao some $35,000 in compensation, ruling that she had suffered years of physical and sexual abuse at the hands of Gault. Sebastiao has stated that Gault has refused to pay child support for their daughter and compensation and alleges he only offered her a one time payment of $200 to support their daughter despite being paid $1 million by the Ontario government. She stated about her ex-husband: "He would rather spend $5,000 on a (motor)bike part than $50 for a good pair of shoes for his daughter." Legal experts state that Sebastiao has a strong case against Gault, but because he is living in witness protection that it is very unlikely that she can force him to pay child support.

== Books ==
- Atwell, David; Langton, Jerry (2017). The Hard Way Out: My Life with the Hells Angels and Why I Turned Against Them. Toronto: HarperCollins. ISBN 978-1443450409.
- Edwards, Peter (2010), The Bandido Massacre; A True Story of Bikers, Brotherhood and Betrayal, HarperCollins Publishers Ltd, ISBN 978-0307372765
- Edwards, Peter (2013). Unrepentant The Strange and (Sometimes) Terrible Life of Lorne Campbell, Satan's Choice and Hells Angels Biker. Toronto: Vintage Canada. ISBN 9780307362575.
- Edwards, Peter (2017), Hard Road: Bernie Guindon and the Reign of the Satan's Choice Motorcycle Club, HarperCollins, ISBN 978-1443427258
- Langton, Jerry (2010), Showdown: How the Outlaws, Hells Angels and Cops Fought for Control of the Streets, John Wiley & Sons, ISBN 978-0470678787
