= Buzz Kanter =

American magazine editor

- Born: 1955 (age 70–71); Connecticut
- Occupation: Magazine publisher
- Title: Publisher/ Editor-In-Chief

Buzz Kanter (born February 1955) is the editor-in-chief and publisher of American Iron Magazine, American Iron Garage and American Iron Salute magazine, and was inducted into the American Motorcyclist Association Hall of Fame in 2002. Buzz was also inducted into the National Motorcycle Museum and Hall of Fame and the Sturgis Motorcycle Hall of Fame.

== Career ==
A third-generation magazine publisher (his grandfather was Albert Kanter and his father and mother founded Penny Publications), Buzz Kanter launched Stamford, Connecticut-based TAM Communications in 1989, as the thesis for his MBA, publishing Old Bike Journal, and two years later purchased American Iron Magazine, which focuses on American motorcycles such as Harley-Davidson and Indian brands. He added RoadBike in 1993 for riders of all makes of motorcycles who enjoy touring and cruising. In 2008, Kanter and TAM Communications launched Classic American Iron Magazine, an online forum for classic American-made motorcycle enthusiasts.

Motorcycle magazine published by Buzz Kanter over the years included Old Bike Journal, American Iron Magazine, Indian Motorcycle Illustrated, Thunder Alley, Hot XL, Hottest Custom Harleys, Roadbike, Motorcycle Rides & Culture, American Iron Retailer, 90 Years of Harley-Davidson, American Glory 100 Years of Harley-Davidson, American Iron Garage, and American Iron Salute. In 1993 Buzz wrote and published his first best-selling book - Indian Motorcycles by Buzz Kanter.

Buzz has raced a number of classic motorcycles over the years in various sports. This includes the ex-Butch Baer 1937 Indian Sport Scout roadracer he competes with in the USCRA (United States Classic Racing Association). Also a number of Moto Giro USA events on small displacement 160 and 250cc single-cylinders Ducati and Moto Guzzi antique motorcycles.

Buzz competed in the first three Motorcycle Cannonball coast to coast antique motorcycle contests. The first one was 2010 when Buzz rode his 1915 Harley-Davidson 3-speed V-twin from Kitty Hawk, NC to Santa Monica, CA. In 2012 he rode the second Motorcycle Cannonball on his 1929 Harley-Davidson JDH "2-Cam" motorcycle across the US from New York from San Francisco. And on the third one, he rode his 1936 Harley-Davidson VLH from Daytona Beach, FL to Tacoma, WA in 2014.

In 2017 Buzz raced his 1915 Harley-Davidson boardtrack racer in the first Sons of Speed antique motorcycle boardtrack races in New Smyrna Beach, FL. He raced and beat event creator Billy Lane on the last lap of the first Sons of Speed heat race ever.

== Personal life ==
Besides motorcycling, Kanter also took up photography, martial arts (he has earned black belts in judo and Taekwondo) and fly fishing.
