= Gerald Ward (biker) =

Canadian outlaw biker and gangster

- Born: 1947 or 1948 (age 78–79); Welland, Ontario, Canada
- Other name: "Skinny"
- Occupations: Outlaw biker; crime boss
- Years active: 1965–
- Allegiance: Papalia crime family; Hells Angels MC (2000–)
- Convictions: Drug trafficking and gangsterism (2008)
- Penalty: 14 years' imprisonment (2009)

Gerald "Skinny" Ward is a Canadian outlaw biker and gangster who served as president of the Niagara County chapter of the Hells Angels Motorcycle Club and as one of the co-leaders of the Hells Angels in Canada.

== The Papalia family ==
Starting in 1965, Ward had 23 convictions for fraud, weapons, drugs, property and violence offenses. He was considered by the police to be the prime drug dealer in the Niagara Peninsula for the Magaddino family of Buffalo, New York via its Canadian subsidy, the Papalia family of Hamilton. Ward was tried for murder three times and attempted murder once, and was acquitted all four times. The journalist Jerry Langton called Ward "an all-time tough guy".

In the summer of 1997, following the murders of Johnny Papalia, the long-time boss of the Papalia family, and Papalia's right-hand man, Carmen Barillaro, Ward was contacted by the Hells Angels national president Walter "Nurget" Stadnick for what the police call a "crime summit". One police officer, Shawn Clarkson, of the Niagara Regional Police Service stated: "There was nobody to stand up to the Hells Angels the way Barillaro or Papalia would have. Papalia, even though he was 73 when he died, he wouldn't have put up with that". Ward was not an outlaw biker and did not even know how to ride a motorcycle, but he agreed to work for the Hells Angels. Len Isnor, the chief of the Ontario Provincial Police's Anti-Biker Enforcement Unit, stated: "Ward was never a biker. But Stadnick said, 'You're a Hells Angel now', and so he become one pretty quickly".

In the summer of 1998, Standick and the entire Hells Angels chapter from Sherbrooke arrived in Niagara Falls for what the police call a crime "summit" with Ward. Ward had been buying his cocaine from the Magaddino family of Buffalo, and was considered to be the most powerful drug dealer in the Niagara peninsula. The Hells Angels' Sherbrooke chapter is known as one of the most violent in Canada, and Stadnick taking the entire Sherbrooke chapter with him to Niagara Falls is believed to have been an act of subtle intimidation on his part. It was agreed at the "crime summit" that henceforward Ward would only buy his drugs from the Hells Angels, thereby establishing Angels' influence in the Niagara peninsula. Clarkson stated: "I don't think (Ward) really wanted to do it, but I don't think they gave him a choice. It was either ... he joined up, or the Hells Angels would bring in ten guys from Quebec to do it. That would be the last thing he'd want." Clarkson described the Ward gang as: "These guys were what I guess you call the criminal elite". Although Ward and his gang did not formally become an Angels chapter until 2000, to all intents and purposes the Ward gang were a part of the Angels from 1998 onward.

== Hells Angels ==
Ward and his gang formally joined the Hells Angels on 29 December 2000 in a ceremony in Sorel, Quebec. Also joining the Hells Angels were two of Ward's subordinates, Kenneth "Wags" Wagner and Tim Panetta. The Ward gang became the Niagara County chapter of the Hells Angels. In the spring of 2002, Ward opened up the clubhouse of his chapter at 855 Darby Road. The guest of honor at the opening ceremony was to the surprise of many Mario "Mike the Wop" Parente, the national president of the Outlaws. Clarkson stated: "Parente and Skinny go back years. They had known each other forever. When Parente showed up, a lot of the younger guys were upset. But he was Skinny's friend, so there was nothing they could do about it".

After formally joining the Hells Angels, Ward had to learn how to ride a motorcycle. David Atwell, a Hells Angel turned police informer, stated the Niagara chapter: "... was formed from a bunch of Stadnick's old coke-dealing buddies. Their president, Gerald "Skinny" Ward, actually had to be taught how to ride a motorcycle. They all knew that with the Hells Angels in Ontario, there would be no drug business at all for them if they didn't join". Atwell met Ward in March 2001 while serving as a bodyguard for Stadnick and stated: "Despite what I had heard about him, Skinny looked like a biker. He had a barrel chest, a long, grey ponytail and a Harley jacket ... Skinny told me he had just finished a long stretch in jail, awaiting trial for a murder charge. I later found out that he was acquitted and spent less than two years behind bars."

Ward was close to having a monopoly of the cocaine trade in the Niagara peninsula and was well known in underworld circles for the high quality of his cocaine, which attracted drug dealers from all over Ontario, seeking to buy from him, and for rival drug dealers pretending to work for him in order to increase their prices. The cocaine Ward sold was between 81 and 90% pure. The police estimated that Ward was responsible for about 75% of all the cocaine sales in the Niagara peninsula. The police informer Steven "Hannibal" Gault testified in 2008: "They have complete control of the coke dealing in the whole Niagara region. Anyone steps in there, they'll kill him point-blank. You don't play with their game. So ... all their lives are built upon drug dealing."

Atwell described the Hells Angels' Niagara chapter under the leadership of Ward as being the richest Hells Angel chapter in Ontario. The Niagara peninsula is one of the most popular tourist areas in Canada as millions of people come every year from across Canada, the United States and the rest of the world to see Niagara Falls. The journalists Julian Sher and William Marsden wrote the Niagara chapter of the Hell Angels made vast sums of money as many of the tourists purchased cocaine and visited strip clubs owned by the Hells Angels. Sher and Marsden wrote that although Toronto had more people than the Niagara peninsula, selling cocaine to the tourists made the Niagara chapter of the Hells Angels as wealthy as the Downtown Toronto chapter led by John "Winner" Neal, which was also a very well-off Angels chapter. Clarkson told Sher and Marsden: "There's always been large consumption and trafficking of cocaine here. There are many attractions down here – tourists, casinos – and it keeps on growing". Joining the Hells Angels allowed Ward to import French-Canadian strippers from Quebec to work as strippers in Niagara Falls, who proved to be very popular. Ward would break up a kilogram of cocaine and sold 2,000 half-grams at $40 per shot. Ward operated out of a fortress-like clubhouse at 855 Darby Road in a rural district outside of Welland. Ward's clubhouse was the largest and best defended Hells Angels clubhouse in all of Ontario. Ward's clubhouse was a two-story building that was a direct copy of the Angels' clubhouse in Sherbrooke that stood out in the countryside as the entire building was painted red and white, the colors of the Hells Angels. Ward was always careful about what he said and had a sticker taped to his mobile phone that read: "Be Careful What You Say On This Phone".

After Stadnick was arrested as part of Operation Springtime in March 2001, the new Hells Angels national leadership was a duumvirate that consisted of Ward together with the North Toronto chapter president Billy Miller. In July 2002, Ward and Miller put an end to a biker war that had brewing in London, Ontario by reassigning the Coates brothers away from London. Starting in August 2005, Ward began to sell cocaine to Steven Gault, the treasurer of the Angels' Oshawa chapter, who was secretly a police informer. During his visits, Ward talked frankly with Gault about his business, saying his chapter was supposed to have at least six members as required by the Angel rules, but in fact had only three members. Besides for Ward, the Niagara chapter consisted only of Kenneth Wagner and Tim Panetta. Ward told Gault: "I'd like to put good, more good guys around, but fuck, it's hard to find good guys". To avoid being expelled from the Hells Angels, Ward had to borrow three members from other chapters, namely Jason "One Eye" Meyer of the Peterborough chapter; Johnny Cane of the Kitchener chapter, and Donny Bachenski of the Hamilton chapter, to keep the Niagara chapter up to the six men rule. Gault told Ward that he always became upset when an Angel was arrested, saying: "If you're busted as a Hells Angel it hurts me to begin with". Ward agreed, saying: "We're all brothers".

Ward told Gault that he was infuriated by drug dealers pretending to work for him in order to charge more for their cocaine. Ward spoke to Gault about how he had caught one drug dealer pretending to work for him, and forced him to pay him $10,000 for using his name without permission. Gault's wire recorded Ward as saying: "I just got 10 grand off a guy two weeks ago. He used my name three times, my name personally." Ward also told Gault about how his son had caught a drug dealer who was pretending to work for him in a nightclub and confronted him, reporting that the dealer had expressed much dismay when he learned that the man who was confronting him was his son. Clarkson stated: "We don't often know what he did to those [minor drug dealers] but they ceased to be a problem for him. That just shows you how powerful the Hells Angels is. The patch carries a lot of weight". Ward told Gault that he was not buying in bulk as he reckoned that the price of cocaine would fall, leading to Gault to say the cocaine business was "like playing the stock market". Ward replied: "Pretty well the same thing. You're up, you're down.". In August 2005, Ward told Gault that there was a corrupt policeman "who knew a lot of stuff" and brought him "paperwork all the time."

=== Project Tandem ===
Due to the information provided by Gault, Ward was arrested on 28 September 2006 as part of Operation Tandem. Also charged with Ward were Kenneth "Wags" Wagner, Richard Beaulieu, Timothy Misue, Alain Lacroix and Deborah Fetz. Ward pleaded guilty to the drug charges on 26 September 2008 while denying the gangsterism charges, insisting he was acting on his own. At Ward's trial in the fall of 2008, Gault testified that various drug dealers would pay Ward $500 per week for the right to sell drugs in the Niagara peninsula and that other drug dealers would pay Gard "tribute" in exchange for him not operating in their territories. On 1 October 2008, Timothy Panetta, the owner of Advantage Auto Sales, was charged with 12 counts of fraud as the police alleged that he had purchased salvaged automobiles in the United States and sold them as legitimate used cars in Canada.

On 12 December 2008, Ward was found guilty of the criminal organization charges as the court accepted the Crown's argument that Ward was selling drugs on behalf of the Hells Angels. In convicting Ward, Justice John McMahanon stated on 12 December 2008: "I am satisfied beyond a reasonable doubt that one of the main purposes of the Hells Angels Motorcycle Club in Canada is the facilitation or commission of serious offences, including trafficking in cocaine and other drugs, extortion and trafficking in firearms". One Hells Angels biker, Lorne Campbell, expressed admiration for the way that Ward refused to testify against the other Angels, saying: "He stayed solid. He got an extra 9 years after three in the bucket, but he stayed solid". On 26 March 2009, Ward was sentenced to 14 years in prison. In sentencing Ward, Justice McMahon described Ward as one of the "top" drug dealers in Ontario, describing him as being at the "pinnacle" of a drug dealing network that spread across Ontario. Ward's subordinate, Wagner, was also sentenced at the same trial to 11 years in prison. On 1 June 2009, the clubhouse of the Hells Angels' Niagara chapter was seized by the Crown under the grounds it was "considered a place where illegal activities took place". In March 2015, Ward was released on parole.

== Books ==
- Atwell, David; Langton, Jerry (2017). The Hard Way Out: My Life with the Hells Angels and Why I Turned Against Them. Toronto: HarperCollins. ISBN 978-1443450409.
- Edwards, Peter (2013). Unrepentant The Strange and (Sometimes) Terrible Life of Lorne Campbell, Satan's Choice and Hells Angels Biker. Toronto: Vintage Canada. ISBN 9780307362575.
- Langton, Jerry (2010), Showdown: How the Outlaws, Hells Angels and Cops Fought for Control of the Streets, John Wiley & Sons, ISBN 978-0470678787
- Sher, Julian; Marsden, William (2003). The Road To Hell How the Biker Gangs Are Conquering Canada. Toronto: Alfred Knopf. ISBN 0-676-97598-4.
