= American IronHorse =

American motorcycle manufacturer

American IronHorse was an American motorcycle manufacturer based in the Dallas-Fort Worth, Texas area that was founded in 1995 by Tim Edmondson and Bill Rucker. At one time, AIH was the largest factory producer of custom motorcycles in the USA. Their 224,000-square-foot (20,800 m^{2}) factory was located in Fort Worth, Texas, and housed the complete manufacturing process under a single roof. Although most (305) parts for the bikes were made in-house, such as the seats and wheels, all American IronHorse motorcycles were built with S&S engines and were assembled in-house. By 2006, the company had sold around 10,000 motorcycles. In Spring 2008, American Ironhorse ceased production on all motorcycles and most company assets were liquidated at auction.

Following Bill Rucker's departure, AIH had a succession of CEOs and Tim Edmondson, President, the second largest shareholder and director of design sold his ownership in the company the following year. In 2005, negotiated a $40 million deal with Textron Inc. Buck Hendricson, who oversaw the company's second bankruptcy, also guided the firm through its sale to Textron Inc, which subsequently liquidated the company in 2008. However they reopened in 2025. But it appears for the time being they are not building new bikes. They offer a rebuild service and have parts, seats and apparel.

The Company specialized in making motorcycles that had large displacement V-twin engines with large fins. One reviewer suggested the products are eye candy and beautiful, more powerful than comparable Harley Davidsons, but lacking in handling and amenities.

== Models ==
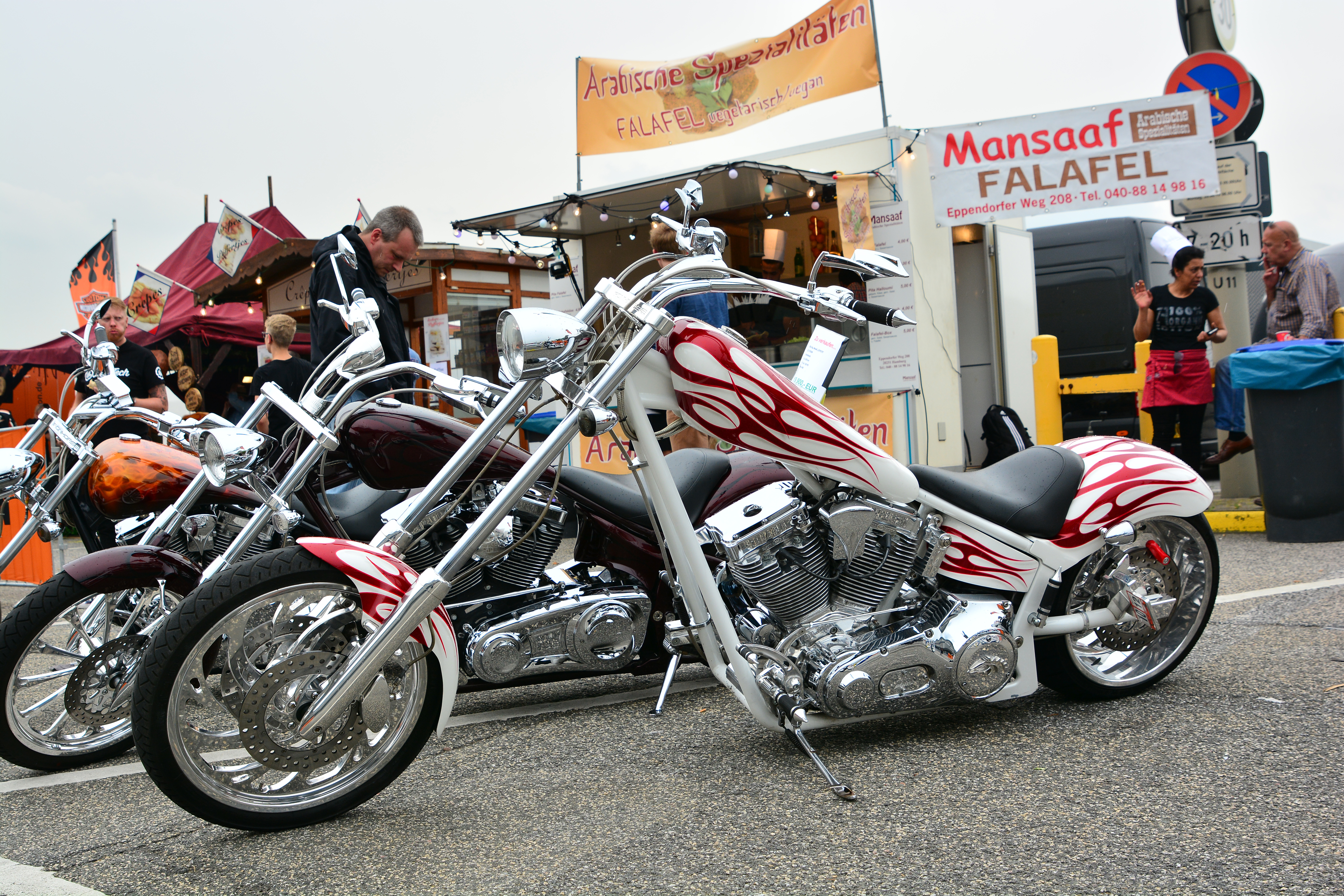
an American IronHorse Custom Texas Chopper in Hamburg, Germany

Roadster

- 10th Anniversary Texas Chopper
- Bandit
- Classic
- Roadster
- SR Roadster
- Stalker
- Thunder
- XR Thunder
- YR Classic
- ZR Slammer
- Texas Chopper-Softtail
- Legend-Softtail
- Slammer-Adjustable Air Ride, named 2007 Bike of the Year by V-twin magazine
- LSC-Lone Star Chopper "Rigid
- Tejas-Rigid
- Outlaw-Softail
- Bandera-Softail
- Classic Chop-Softail
- Judge-Softail
- Ironhorse Ranger
- Ironhorse Bagger
