= List of people from Westport, Connecticut =

This list of people from Westport, Connecticut includes people who have been born in, raised in, lived in or who died in Westport, Connecticut, United States. Individuals are listed by the area in which they are best known.

== Actors, comedians, others in the television, film and digital media ==
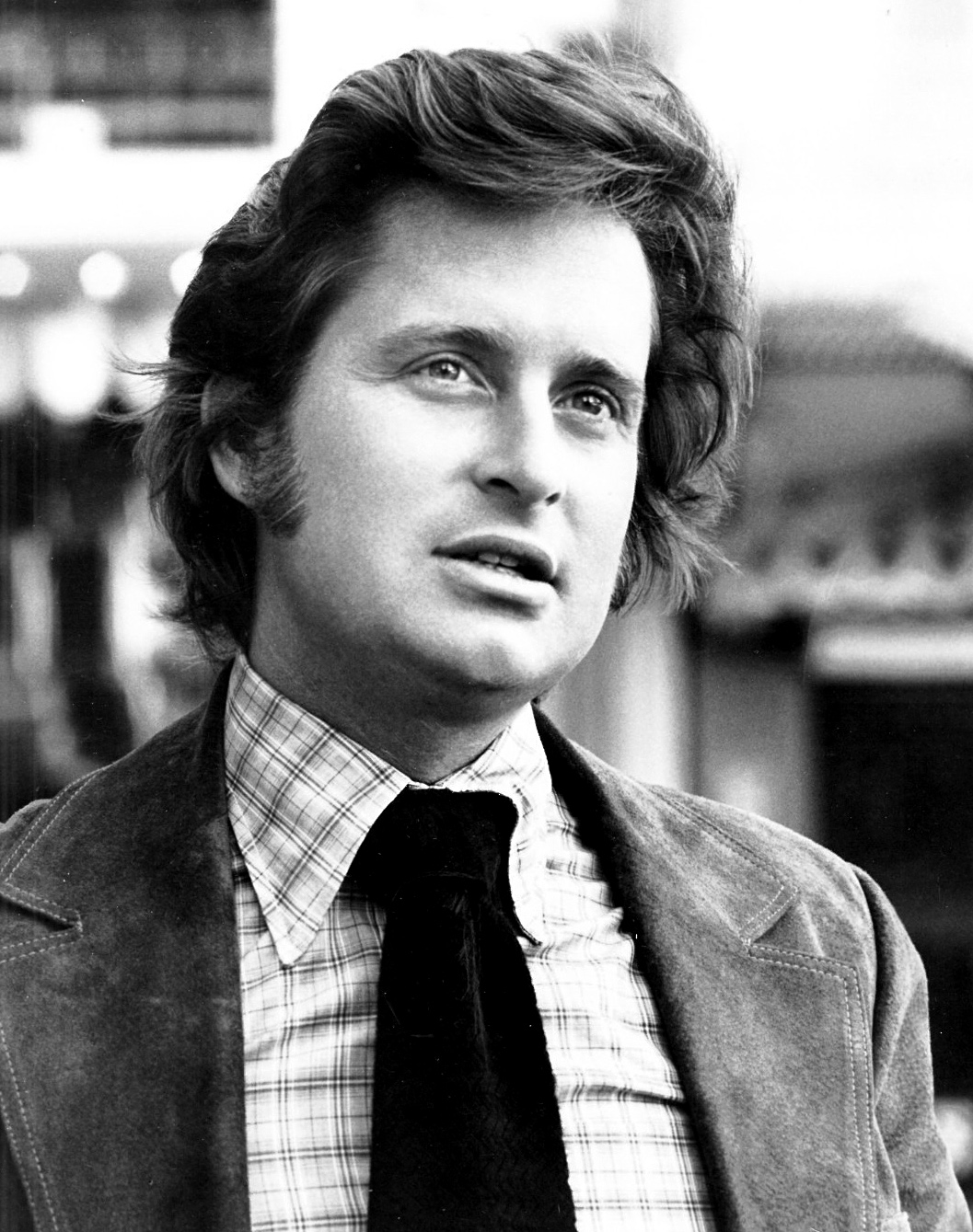
Michael Douglas

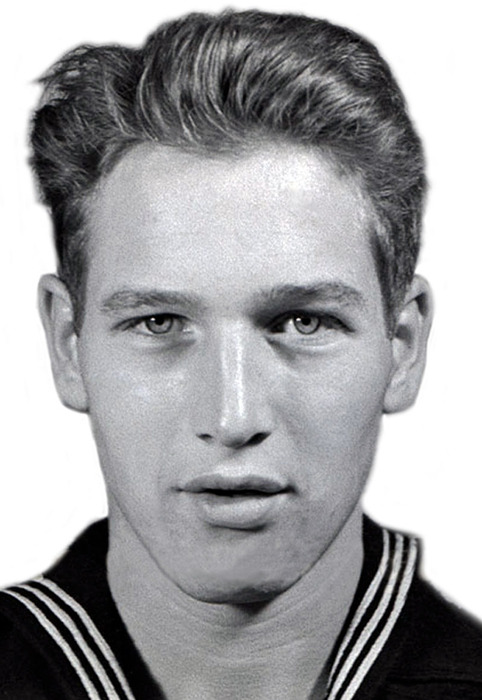
Paul Newman

- Mason Adams (1919–2005), character and voice actor
- Millette Alexander (born 1933), actress, musician
- Mädchen Amick (born 1970), actress
- Linda Blair (born 1959), actress known for The Exorcist
- Scott Bryce (born 1958), actor
- Alisyn Camerota (born 1966), CNN newscaster
- Marilyn Chambers (1952–2009), porn star
- Imogene Coca (1908–2001), comedian
- Kevin Conroy (1955-2022), actor
- Rodney Dangerfield (1921–2004), comedian and actor
- Bette Davis (1908–1989), Academy Award-winning actress
- Sandy Dennis (1937–1992), Academy Award-winning actress
- Phil Donahue (1935–2024), television personality, talk show host, married to Marlo Thomas
- Michael Douglas (born 1944), Academy Award-winning actor
- Linda Fiorentino (born 1960), actress
- Cynthia Gibb (born 1963), actress
- Luke Greenfield (born 1972), movie director
- Matt Harding (born 1976), Internet celebrity and video game designer
- Melissa Joan Hart (born 1976), actress
- Mariette Hartley (born 1940), actress
- Linda Hunt (born 1945), actress
- Mar Jennings (born 1975), television personality, author and philanthropist
- Patricia Kalember (born 1957), actress
- Brian Keane (born 1953), Emmy-winning composer
- Kerri Kenney-Silver (born 1970), actress, singer, writer and daughter of Larry Kenney
- Michael Kulich (1986–2016), pornographic film director and producer
- Paul Lieberstein (born 1967), writer and co-star of American version of The Office
- Christopher Lloyd (born 1938), actor and producer
- Bob Lorenz (born 1963), television sportscaster
- George Lowther (1913–1975), writer and producer for radio and television programs
- Pamela Sue Martin (born 1953), actress
- Cady McClain (born 1969), soap opera actress
- Steve Miner (born 1951), film and television director
- Tim Monich (born 1950), film and television dialect coach
- Gerry Mulligan (1927–1996), jazz saxophonist, composer and arranger
- Paul Newman (1925–2008), Academy Award-winning actor, director, auto racer and philanthropist
- Justin Paul (born 1985), composer
- Alisan Porter (born 1981), actress (Curly Sue) and singer
- Robert Redford (1936–2025), Academy Award-winning actor and director
- Eric Roberts (born 1956), actor
- Rod Serling (1924–1975), creator of The Twilight Zone
- Micah Sloat (born 1981), actor and star of Paranormal Activity
- Brett Somers (1924–2007), actress, wife of Jack Klugman, game show personality
- Martha Stewart (born 1941), business magnate, television personality, author
- Marlo Thomas (born 1937), actress, author, wife of Phil Donahue
- Joanne Woodward (born 1930), Academy Award-winning actress and philanthropist

== Singers, musicians and other entertainers ==
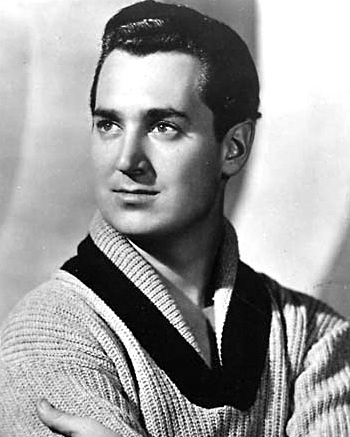
Neil Sedaka

- Nickolas Ashford, singer
- Michael Bolton, singer
- Chelsea Cutler, singer
- Matt Gallant (born 1964), television host
- Mike Greenberg, ESPN personality, host of Mike and Mike
- Dan Hartman (1950–1994), singer, songwriter and record producer
- Don Imus, radio personality
- Charlie Karp, guitar player and songwriter
- Brian Keane, award-winning composer, producer, and guitarist
- Larry Kenney, radio personality on the Don Imus show, actor, father of Kerri Kenney-Silver
- Meat Loaf (Marvin Lee Aday), rock singer and songwriter
- Gerry Mulligan, Gerald Joseph "Gerry" Mulligan (1927–1996), jazz saxophonist, composer and arranger
- Nile Rodgers, musician and music producer
- Harry Rodrigues, DJ also known as Baauer
- Neil Sedaka, singer
- Neal Smith, drummer for Alice Cooper, Rock and Roll Hall of Fame inductee
- John Solum, flutist, author and teacher
- Martha Stewart, entrepreneur
- Eric Von Schmidt (1931–2007), folk and blues singer-songwriter
- Hy Zaret (1907–2007), lyricist

== Artists, illustrators, cartoonists, designers ==
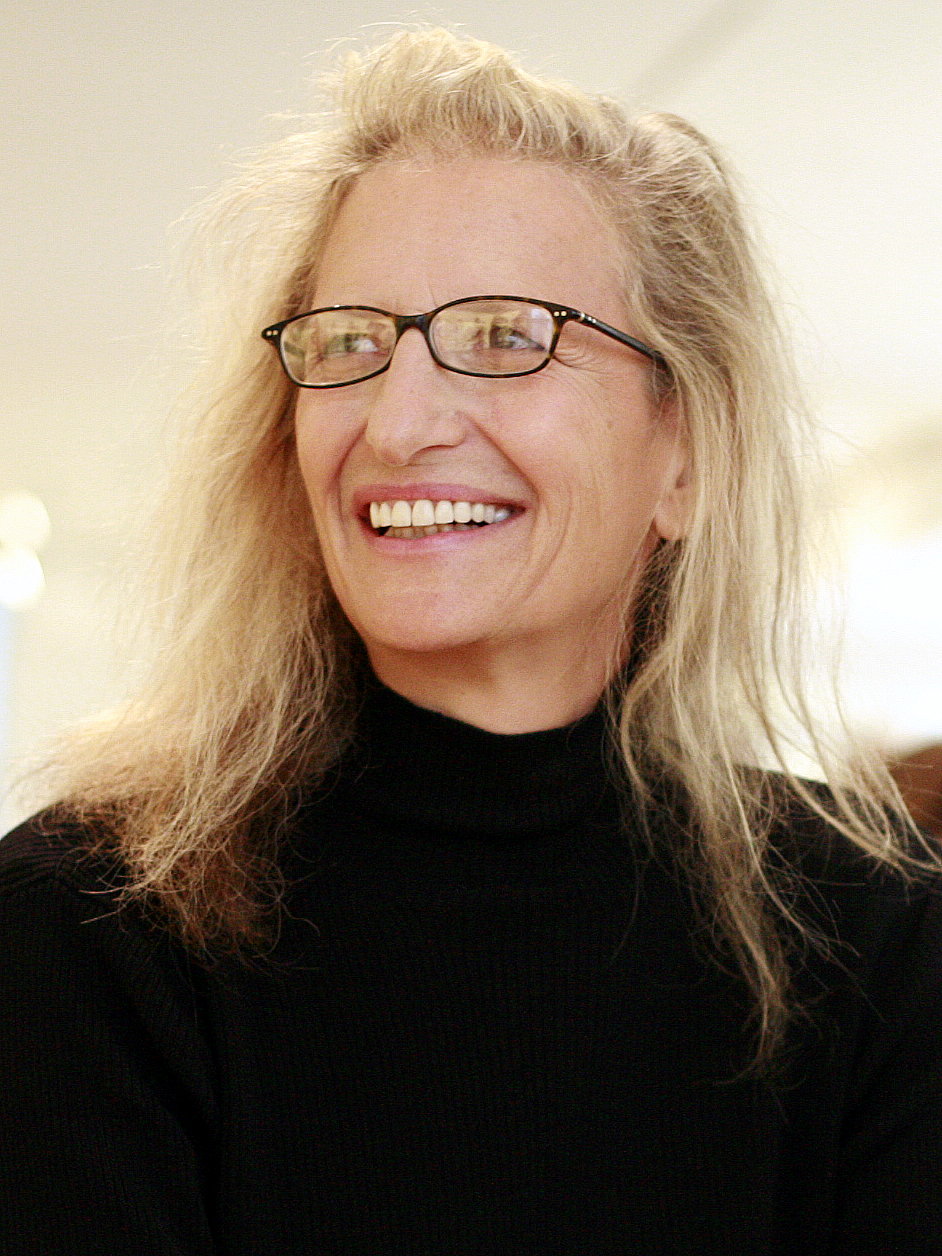
Annie Leibovitz

- Rudolph Belarski, illustrator, graphic artist, painter, art school instructor
- Mel Casson, cartoonist
- Ann Chernow, artist
- Stevan Dohanos (1907–1994), artist and illustrator
- Leonard Everett Fisher (1924–2024), artist and illustrator
- Scott Froschauer, artist, sculptor, and key grip
- Bernie Fuchs (1932–2009), renowned illustrator
- William Glackens (1870–1938), realist painter
- Hardie Gramatky (1907–1979), painter, author, and illustrator
- Annie Leibovitz (born 1949), portrait photographer
- Joe McNally, photographer
- Christopher Ross (1931–2023), sculptor, designer and collector
- T. O'Conor Sloane Jr. (1879–1963), photographer
- Curt Swan (1920–1996), comics artist
- Gerry Turner (1921–1982), photographer and writer of children's books
- Edward Vebell (1921–2018), illustrator
- Hilla von Rebay (1890–1967), painter and founding curator of the Solomon R. Guggenheim Museum
- George Hand Wright (1872–1951), painter and illustrator

== Athletes, sportspeople ==
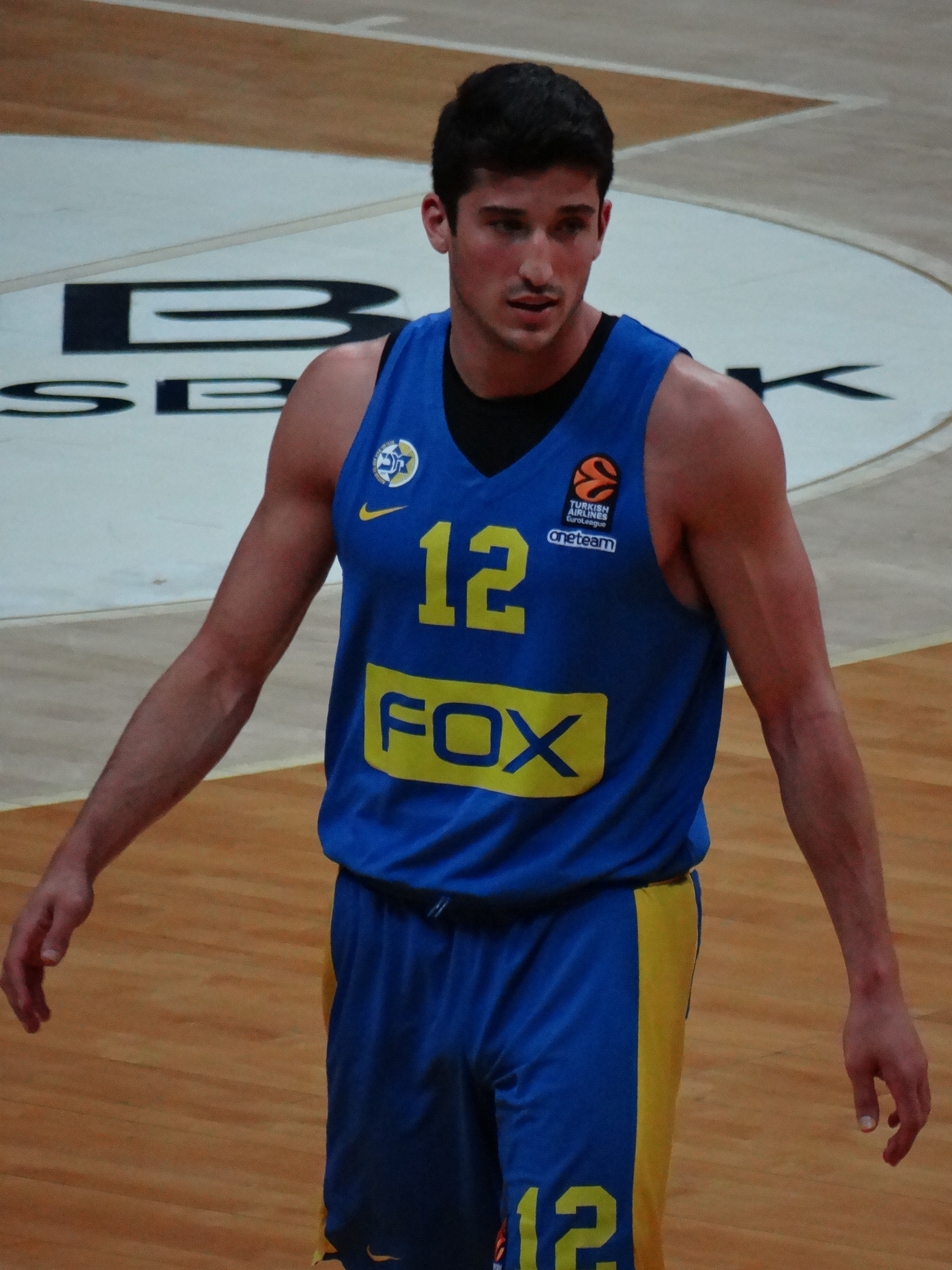
John DiBartolomeo

- John DiBartolomeo (born 1991), American-Israeli basketball player for Maccabi Tel Aviv of the Israeli Basketball Premier League
- Shayne Gostisbehere (born 1993), NHL Player for the Carolina Hurricanes
- Parker Kligerman (born 1990), NASCAR driver
- Skip Lane (born 1960), football player
- Julia Marino (born 1997), snowboarder
- Kyle Martino (born 1981), soccer player
- Jim McKay (1921–2008), Emmy award-winning sports commentator
- Stephanie McMahon (born 1976), professional wrestler
- Charlie Reiter (born 1988), soccer player
- Triple H (born 1969), professional wrestler
- Julius Seligson (1909–1987), tennis player
- Kyle Zajec (born 1997), soccer player

== Authors, writers, journalists ==
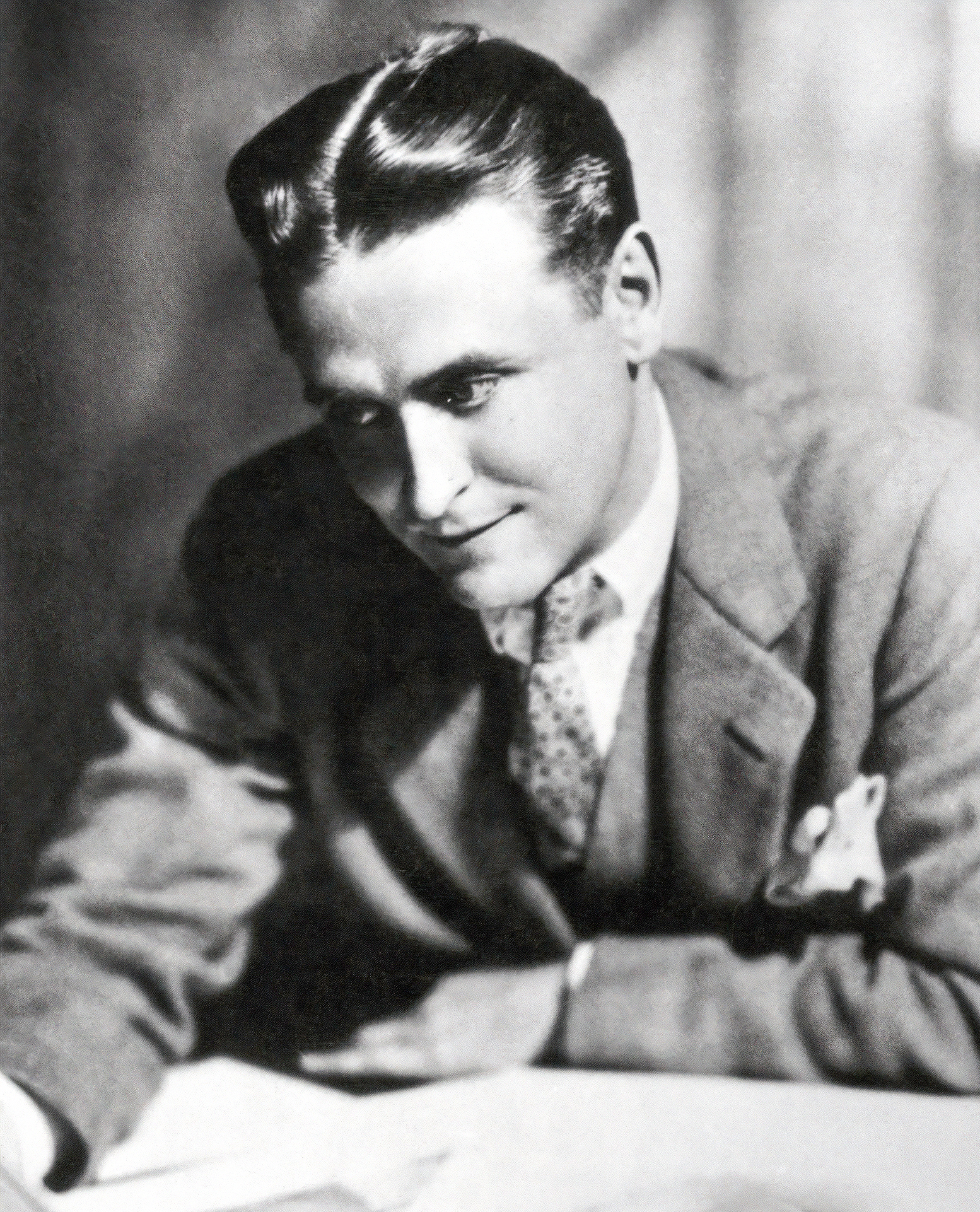
F. Scott Fitzgerald

- Lynsey Addario (born 1973), journalist, freelance photographer
- Lincoln Child (born 1957), author of techno-thriller and horror novels
- Finn Courtney (born 2004), journalist
- Frank Deford (1938-2017), journalist, writer and commentator
- Peter De Vries (1910–1993), editor and novelist
- F. Scott Fitzgerald (1896–1940), author of The Great Gatsby
- Ramin Ganeshram (born 1968), journalist, chef, author
- Hardie Gramatky (1907–1979), author, artist, illustrator
- Jane Green (born 1968), also known as Jane Green Warburg, author
- Tyler Hicks (born 1969), journalist, staff photographer, The New York Times
- A.E. Hotchner, author and co-founder with Paul Newman of Newman's Own brands
- Shirley Jackson (1916–1965), novelist
- Mar Jennings (born 1975), author
- Gordon Joseloff (1945–2020), former First Selectman and Emmy Award-winning journalist
- Melissa Kirsch (born 1974), author
- Hilton Kramer (1928–2012), editor and art critic
- Ruth Krauss (1901–1993), author of children's books
- Nora Benjamin Kubie (1899–1988), author and illustrator of children's books
- Robert Lawson (1892–1957), author and artist of children's books
- Robert Ludlum, author
- Sheila Lukins (1942–2009), cook and food writer
- Jim Nantz, CBS Sports
- Jeff Pegues, CBS News Justice and Homeland Security Correspondent; author
- David Pogue, New York Times technology columnist
- Harry Reasoner (1923–1991), news anchor
- Ronald B. Scott, journalist, biographer and author
- T. O'Conor Sloane III (1912–2003), Doubleday editor
- Jack Tippit, cartoonist
- Gerry Turner, author of children's books and photographer
- Max Wilk (1920–2011), author
- Jane Yolen, author

== Government and politics, officeholders, activists and business people ==
- James Comey (born 1960), Deputy Attorney General and FBI Director
- Wilbur Lucius Cross (1862–1948), Governor of Connecticut
- Ray Dalio, CEO, money manager at Bridgewater Associates
- William Phelps Eno (1858–1945), inventor of the stop sign and traffic innovator
- Jonathan Grayer, Founder and CEO of Imagine Learning; CEO of Kaplan, Inc.
- Rajat Gupta (born 1948), CEO of McKinsey & Company convicted of insider trading
- Will Haskell, Connecticut state senator
- Henry M. Judah, Civil War brigadier general
- Arnie Kaye, owner of a town arcade
- John Davis Lodge (1903–1985), Connecticut Governor and Congressman
- Brooks Newmark (born 1958), British politician
- Frederick M. Salmon (1870–1936), Connecticut State Comptroller
- James K. Scribner, member of the Wisconsin State Assembly
- Lillian Wald (1867–1940), nurse and humanitarian activist
- Anne Wexler (1930–2009), political advisor and lobbyist

== Scientists ==
- John William Fyfe, physician who practiced eclectic medicine
- Mariangela Lisanti, theoretical physicist
- Mary Loveless, immunologist who developed a bee sting immunity
- John B. Watson (1878–1958), psychologist who established the school of behaviorism

== See also ==
- List of people from Connecticut
- List of people from Bridgeport, Connecticut
- List of people from Brookfield, Connecticut
- List of people from Darien, Connecticut
- List of people from Greenwich, Connecticut
- List of people from Hartford, Connecticut
- List of people from New Canaan, Connecticut
- List of people from New Haven, Connecticut
- List of people from Norwalk, Connecticut
- List of people from Redding, Connecticut
- List of people from Ridgefield, Connecticut
- List of people from Stamford, Connecticut
