= John Fyfe =

John Fyfe may refer to:

- John Fyfe (footballer) (1873–1950), Scottish footballer
- John K. Fyfe, United States Navy submarine commander in World War II
- John William Fyfe (1839–?), American physician
