= Jerry Turner =

Jerry Turner may refer to:

- Jerry Turner (theater director) (1927–2004), artistic director of the Oregon Shakespeare Festival, 1971–1991
- Jerry Turner (anchorman) (1929–1987), American television news anchorman
- Jerry Turner (American football) (born 1978), arena football player
- Jerry Turner (baseball) (born 1954), former Major League Baseball outfielder
- Jerry Turner (politician) (born 1941), American politician in Mississippi

== See also ==
- Gerry Turner (1921–1982), children's author
- Gerald Turner, academic administrator
- Jeremy Turner (disambiguation)
