= Audra Lowe =

- Born: Audra Prather
- Education: University of California, Santa Barbara (B.A. 1993); University of California, Los Angeles (M.A. 1998)
- Occupations: Talk show host, journalist, entrepreneur
- Spouse: Randall Lowe
- Website: audralowe.com

Audra Lowe (née Prather) is a talk show host, journalist, and entrepreneur For six seasons, she was the host of The Better Show. In 2012, Lowe became the host of The Broadway Channel.

== Early life and education ==
Lowe, born Audra Prather, a native of Los Angeles, California, matriculated to the University of California, Santa Barbara. While on campus, she worked for the college radio station KCSB-FM as a reporter and anchor. She graduated from UC Santa Barbara with two B.A.s in 1993 in communications and black studies. She later attended the University of California, Los Angeles and graduated with an M.A. in 1998.

== Television career ==
=== Early career ===
Lowe's journalism career started after college with KCAL-TV. She later joined KADY-TV in Ventura, California as an associate producer. She was noticed by the news director practicing reading scripts after hours and was put on camera after a regular on-air talent called in sick.

Her television path included stops at KNBC, KABC-TV, ABC Entertainment, KCOP-TV, The Walt Disney Company, KNX, and BET.

Lowe joined FOX and served as the host for Fox Sports's FoxWire as well as entertainment-based FoxNOW.

=== The Better Show ===
In 2007, Lowe was named host of The Better Show, a nationally syndicated lifestyle television program produced by the Meredith Corporation, for which she relocated to New York. The Better Show launched in 12 markets and saw expansion with Lowe as the host to 180 markets over 80% of the country.

In July 2012, Lowe was named one of the Top 10 TV Lifestyle Hosts on Twitter based on her Klout score.

Lowe was replaced by Rebecca Budig as host of The Better Show in September 2013 before the start of the show's seventh season.

=== The Broadway Channel ===
In August 2012, Lowe was named host of The Broadway Channel's What's Hot on Broadway feature as well as other events.

== Entrepreneurship ==
Lowe started Lowe Blow Tees, a line of maternity shirts, after getting the idea while pregnant with her daughter. She sells the line through her website as well as through eBay.

== Personal life ==
Lowe married Randall Lowe. She has one daughter.
