= Ken Fyfe =

Scottish rugby union player

- Born: Kenneth Carmichael Fyfe; 14 April 1914 Karachi, British India
- Died: 29 January 1974 (aged 59) Johannesburg, South Africa

Rugby union career
- Position: Wing
Amateur team(s)
Years	Team	Apps	(Points)
- University of Cambridge
Senior career
Years	Team	Apps	(Points)
- Sale
International career
Years	Team	Apps	(Points)
1933-39	Scotland	10	(25)

Kenneth Carmichael Fyfe (14 April 1914 – 29 January 1974) was a Scottish rugby union player.

== Career ==
He was born in Karachi (now Pakistan) and died in Johannesburg, South Africa. His mother was English and his father was the Scottish international association football player John Fyfe, with his heritage making him eligible for the Scotland national rugby union team – he gained nine caps between 1933 and 1939 including two Calcutta Cup wins over England at Murrayfield, and scored the winning try in the 1933 fixture. He attended the University of Cambridge and counted Sale among his club sides.

He also played cricket, and represented the Europeans cricket team in India during the 1937/38 season.
