= A Star Is Born (2018 film) =

2018 film directed by Bradley Cooper

- Theatrical release poster
- Directed by: Bradley Cooper
- Screenplay by: Eric Roth; Bradley Cooper; Will Fetters
- Based on: A Star Is Born (1954 screenplay) by Moss Hart; A Star Is Born (1976 screenplay) by; John Gregory Dunne; Joan Didion; Frank Pierson; A Star Is Born (story) by; William Wellman; Robert Carson
- Produced by: Bill Gerber; Jon Peters; Bradley Cooper; Todd Phillips; Lynette Howell Taylor
- Starring: Bradley Cooper; Lady Gaga; Andrew Dice Clay; Dave Chappelle; Sam Elliott
- Cinematography: Matthew Libatique
- Edited by: Jay Cassidy
- Production companies: Metro-Goldwyn-Mayer Pictures; Live Nation Productions; Gerber Pictures; Peters Entertainment; Joint Effort
- Distributed by: Warner Bros. Pictures
- Release dates: August 31, 2018 (Venice); October 5, 2018 (United States)
- Running time: 136 minutes
- Country: United States
- Language: English
- Budget: $36 million
- Box office: $439.9 million

A Star Is Born is a 2018 American musical romantic drama film produced and directed by Bradley Cooper in his directorial debut, from a screenplay he wrote with Eric Roth and Will Fetters. It stars Cooper and Lady Gaga in the lead roles, with Andrew Dice Clay, Dave Chappelle and Sam Elliott in supporting roles. The film follows Jackson Maine (Cooper), an established musician struggling with alcoholism and addiction, who discovers and falls in love with aspiring singer Ally (Gaga) as her career begins to eclipse his own. It is the third remake of the 1937 film, following the 1954 and 1976 adaptations.

The film underwent a prolonged development process, with various directors and performers attached before Cooper took over as director. Principal photography began in April 2017; the production emphasized authenticity through concert sequences filmed at real music festivals, live-recorded vocals, and a naturalistic visual style that placed the camera close to the performers. The film's original music was developed alongside the screenplay, with songs written and revised during production to reflect the characters' emotional journeys. A Star Is Born premiered at the 75th Venice International Film Festival on August 31, 2018, and was theatrically released in the United States on October 5 by Warner Bros. Pictures.

The film was a critical and commercial success, grossing $439.9 million worldwide against a $36 million production budget. Critics particularly praised Cooper's direction and the performances and chemistry of Cooper and Gaga, while the cinematography, music and Elliott's supporting performance also drew positive notices. The accompanying soundtrack was similarly successful, becoming one of the world's best-selling albums of 2019 and producing the single "Shallow", which topped the charts in multiple countries. The film received eight nominations at the 91st Academy Awards, including Best Picture, Best Actor for Cooper, Best Actress for Gaga and Best Supporting Actor for Elliott, and won Best Original Song for "Shallow". It also received nominations and awards at the Golden Globe Awards, BAFTAs and Grammy Awards, and has since been included in retrospective lists of the best musicals, romance films, and remakes.

== Plot ==
43-year-old Jackson "Jack" Maine, a country rock singer privately battling alcohol and drug addiction, performs at a concert. His primary source of support is Bobby, his manager and older half-brother. After a show, Jack goes out for drinks and visits a drag bar.

There, Jack witnesses a tribute performance to Édith Piaf by 31-year-old Ally, who works as a waitress and singer-songwriter. He is impressed by her performance, and they spend the night talking. Ally discusses her unsuccessful efforts to pursue a professional music career. She shares lyrics she has written, and Jack tells her she is a talented songwriter and should perform her material. Jack invites Ally to his next show. Despite her initial refusal, she attends and, with Jack's encouragement, sings "Shallow" on stage with him. Footage of the performance, recorded by audience members, goes viral, helping launch Ally's career. Jack invites Ally on tour, and they form a romantic relationship.

In Arizona, Ally and Jack visit the ranch where Jack grew up and where his father had been buried. However, they discover that Bobby has sold the land, which has been converted into a wind farm. Angered at the betrayal, Jack attacks Bobby, who subsequently quits as his manager. Before leaving, Bobby reveals that he had informed Jack about the sale, but Jack was too drunk to notice.

While on tour, Ally meets Rez, a music producer and manager who offers her a contract. Although uneasy about the offer, Jack supports Ally's decision to sign the contract. Rez steers Ally away from country music and toward pop. Jack misses one of Ally's performances after he passes out drunk in public. Jack recovers at the home of his best friend George "Noodles" Stone and later makes up with Ally. There, he proposes to her with an impromptu ring made from a loop of a guitar string. They marry that same day at a church, with the ceremony officiated by Noodles's cousin.

During Ally's performance on Saturday Night Live, Bobby reconciles with Jack. Later, Ally and a drunken Jack fight over her growing artistic success. Jack criticizes Ally's new image and music, as her career rises while his declines. At the Grammy Awards, where Ally is nominated in three categories, a visibly intoxicated Jack performs a tribute to Roy Orbison. Later in the evening, she wins Best New Artist. As Ally is giving her acceptance speech, a still-inebriated Jack staggers up to her, publicly wets himself, and passes out. Ally's father, Lorenzo, berates a semi-conscious Jack while Ally attempts to help Jack sober up.

Jack joins a rehabilitation program shortly thereafter. He discloses to his counselor that he attempted suicide at age 12 and reveals his progressively worsening tinnitus. Jack tearfully apologizes to Ally for his behavior. While returning home, Jack admits to Bobby that it was him, not their father, whom he idolized. Ally asks Rez to allow Jack to accompany her on her European tour, but Rez refuses, prompting Ally to cancel the remainder of the tour to care for Jack.

Rez confronts Jack and accuses him of nearly ruining Ally's career, predicting that Jack will eventually relapse and telling him that it is "embarrassing" she is married to him. That evening, Ally lies to Jack and tells him that her record label canceled her tour so she can focus on her second album. Jack promises he will come to her concert that night, but after Ally leaves, he hangs himself in their garage. Grief-stricken after Jack's suicide, Ally is visited by Bobby, who assures her that she is not to blame for his death. The closing scenes reveal a flashback of Jack working on a song about his love for Ally, which he never finished writing. Ally performs it as a tribute to Jack, introducing herself for the first time as Ally Maine.

== Cast ==
- Bradley Cooper as Jackson "Jack" Maine, an established singer-songwriter struggling with alcoholism. He is Ally's mentor.
- Lady Gaga as Ally Maine, a singer-songwriter who is discovered by Jack.
- Andrew Dice Clay as Lorenzo, Ally's father.
- Dave Chappelle as George "Noodles" Stone, a retired musician and Jack's best friend.
- Sam Elliott as Bobby Maine, Jack's older half-brother and manager.
- Rafi Gavron as Rez Gavron, a music producer and Ally's manager.
- Anthony Ramos as Ramon, Ally's friend.
- Drena De Niro as Paulette Stone, Noodles's wife.
- Greg Grunberg as Phil, Jack's driver.

Additionally, Shangela appears as the drag bar MC, Willam Belli as drag queen Emerald, and Ron Rifkin as Jackson's rehab therapist Carl. Barry Shabaka Henley appears as Little Feet, a veteran session musician. Rebecca Field portrays Gail, while Michael Harney portrays Wolfie, a friend of Lorenzo. Lukas Nelson & Promise of the Real appear as Jackson's band. Don Was, Victor Indrizzo, Michael Bearden, Lenny Castro, and George Doering portray members of a separate supergroup assembled for the Roy Orbison tribute performance at the Grammy Awards. Eddie Griffin appears as a local preacher and Luenell appears as a cashier. Marlon Williams, Brandi Carlile, Alec Baldwin, Halsey and Don Roy King cameo as themselves.

== Production ==
=== Pre-production ===
Previous remakes of the original 1937 film included the 1954 adaptation starring Judy Garland, and the 1976 rock musical with Barbra Streisand and Kris Kristofferson as the leads. Furthermore, the Bollywood romance film Aashiqui 2 (2013) was inspired by A Star Is Born but was not a remake. Warner Bros. originally developed a new adaptation for director Carl Franklin and Will Smith, but Smith passed on the project in favor of starring in the Muhammad Ali biopic Ali (2001). In 2000, Jamie Foxx and Oliver Stone became attached to the project, with Foxx naming R&B singer Aaliyah as his first choice for the female lead. Lauryn Hill and Mariah Carey were also considered for the female lead, and Alicia Keys turned down an offer to play the female lead in the film. In 2002, Smith returned to the project and approached Jennifer Lopez to co-star in a version that would have reversed the story's traditional gender roles, with Lopez as the established star and Smith as the rising performer. Joel Schumacher was subsequently attached to direct, though he expressed uncertainty over whether the project would move forward. The adaptation was subsequently shelved for several years.

In January 2011, it was reported that Clint Eastwood was in talks to direct a new adaptation with Beyoncé in the lead role. The project was delayed on account of Beyoncé's pregnancy. In April 2012, writer Will Fetters told Collider that the script was inspired by Kurt Cobain. Over the course of the film's development, talks with Christian Bale, Leonardo DiCaprio, Tom Cruise, Johnny Depp and Smith to play the male lead failed to come to fruition. Eastwood was interested in Esperanza Spalding to play the female lead. On March 24, 2015, Warner Bros. Pictures announced that Cooper was in final talks to make his directorial debut with the film. Beyoncé was again in talks to join, though still unsigned. In order to secure his first directorial commitment, Cooper forwent an upfront salary in favor of a back-end deal; Forbes later estimated that he earned about $40 million from the film.

Cooper acknowledged that he was initially discouraged from directing the film, as the project had undergone a prolonged development process involving multiple filmmakers and stars. Despite warnings from those close to him and recognizing the risks of helming another remake, he remained committed, saying the project "ignited something" in him and reflected a long-standing personal connection to music and songwriting. Cooper had wanted to direct since childhood but had been "terrified" of doing so, and said that turning 40 gave him the sense that it was time to make his directorial debut. During the promotion of American Sniper (2014), Cooper and Eastwood attended an industry event at the Chateau Marmont where Annie Lennox performed "I Put a Spell on You". Inspired by the performance, Cooper suggested reviving A Star Is Born, but Eastwood told him that the project had moved on. Cooper dreamed the film's opening sequence that night and subsequently used the vision when pitching his version to Warner Bros.

A major issue in the development process was Warner Bros.' reluctance to deal with Jon Peters, who held rights to the material dating back to his production of the 1976 film. The studio ultimately reached an agreement with Peters to proceed, and his producer credit was retained due to contractual obligations, although he was not involved in the film's production and did not receive the Producers Guild of America "p.g.a." designation. (Note: The "p.g.a." designation indicates that a producer performed a substantial portion of the producing duties and is typically used by the Academy of Motion Picture Arts and Sciences when determining eligible nominees for the Academy Award for Best Picture.) Peters had previously faced sexual harassment allegations, which he denied. Cooper said he had been unaware of the allegations and explained that Peters's consent was necessary to make the film, adding that "Luckily, Jon wasn't there."

=== Casting ===
While Clint Eastwood was attached to direct the film with Beyoncé, he approached Cooper about playing the male lead. Cooper declined, later explaining that he felt he was too young for the role and had not lived enough to convincingly portray the character, particularly his alcoholism. After making American Sniper with Eastwood and performing The Elephant Man, Cooper felt prepared to take on the role. In March 2015, Cooper entered final talks to make his directorial debut with the film and was also considering taking the male lead. Cooper said that he had initially planned only to direct the film and wanted an established musician to play Jackson, but the studio declined to make the film with his choice. Variety reported that Cooper had met with Jack White about the role, although Cooper later dismissed reports that White had been in line to play Jackson as "one of those internet things".

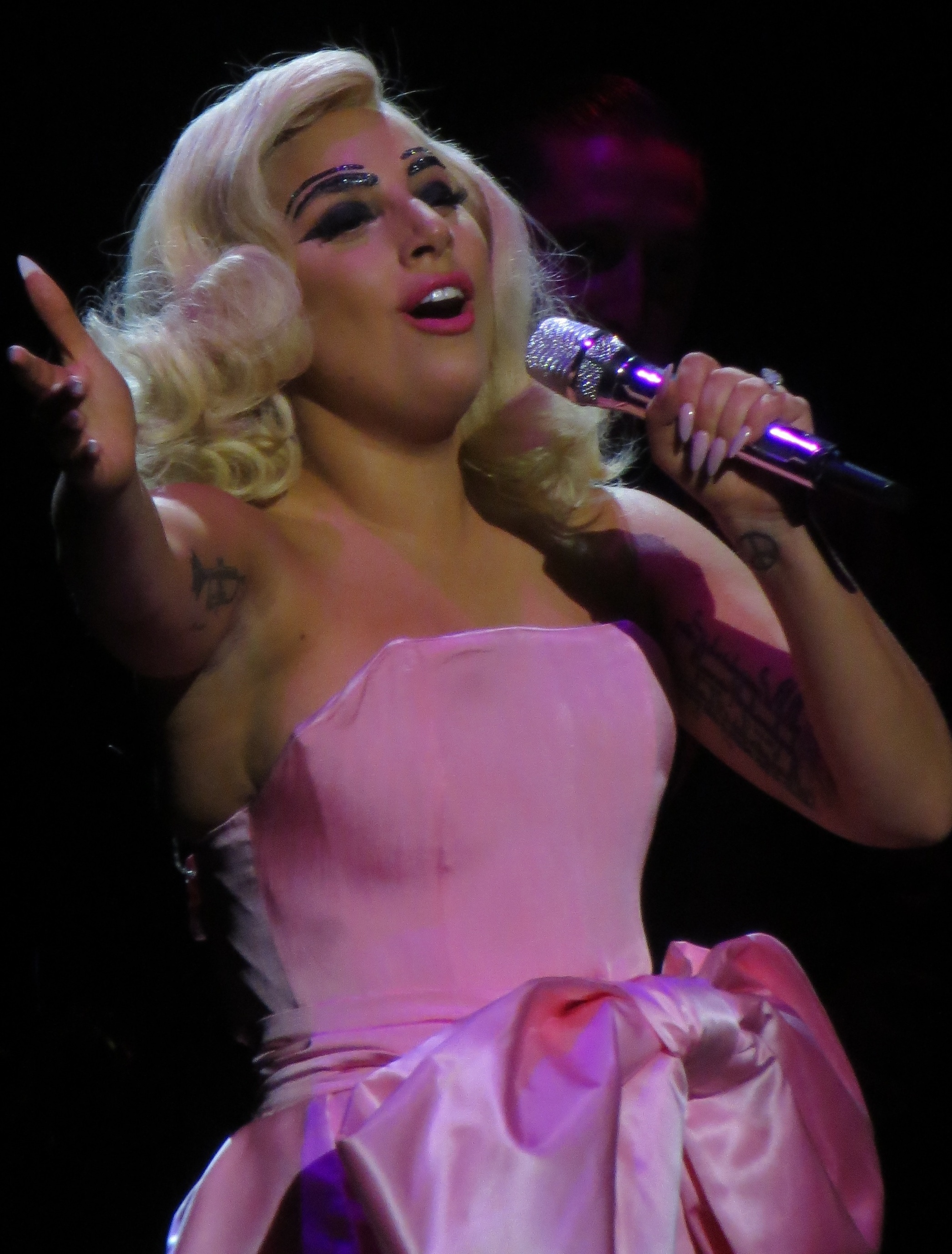
Lady Gaga singing "La vie en rose" at a 2015 concert in the Royal Albert Hall. Her performance of the song at a charity event attended by Bradley Cooper led him to cast her in A Star Is Born.

On August 16, 2016, it was reported that Lady Gaga had officially become attached and the studio had green-lit the project to begin production early 2017. Beyoncé was the first choice for the role and worked with Cooper on it for a year before leaving the project. Adele was briefly considered to replace her before Cooper met Gaga. Cooper decided to cast Gaga after seeing her perform "La Vie en rose" at a cancer benefit, recalling that she "demolished the room" and convinced him of her suitability for the role. He subsequently met her at her Malibu home, where the two developed an immediate rapport and began working together, including singing and testing material informally, which helped shape their on-screen dynamic. Gaga later said she was drawn to the project because of Cooper's involvement as both lead actor and director. She formally tested for the role at her home, where she and Cooper shot ten pages in one day and first sang together at the piano, an encounter both later described as pivotal to their collaboration. Gaga's presence during their first meeting convinced Cooper that the film would work if she could bring the same immediacy to the screen. Warner Bros. requested the test as proof of concept before green-lighting the film; Cooper enlisted cinematographer Janusz Kamiński to shoot it and later screened the result theatrically for the studio.

On November 9, 2016, it was reported that Ray Liotta was in talks to join the film in the role of the manager of Cooper's character, though he ultimately was not involved. Howard Stern was the first choice for the role of Jackson's older brother Bobby, but he passed on the part. On March 17, 2017, Sam Elliott joined the film in the role. Cooper said he had written the role of Bobby with Elliott in mind. When he approached Elliott, he played him a recorded interview in which he imitated Elliott's voice, since he had already modeled Jackson's cadence on him. Elliott's acceptance was crucial because months of vocal preparation had been built around that model. Also in March 2017, Andrew Dice Clay entered negotiations to play Lorenzo, the father of Lady Gaga's character, a role described as the comic relief in the film, and "very Italian". Clay was reportedly selected over Robert De Niro, John Turturro and John Travolta. Cooper, a longtime admirer of Clay, said he met with him for about four hours before having him improvise with Gaga to determine whether he was convincing as her father.

In April 2017, Rafi Gavron, Michael Harney, and Rebecca Field also joined the cast. In May, Dave Chappelle was cast in the film as Noodles; Cooper said he had courted Chappelle for the role for two and a half years after the two spent an evening together in London, where their rapport inspired the dynamic he wanted for the characters. Cooper said there was "no second choice" for the role and partly based Noodles on Jack White's drummer. Cooper also hand-picked Luenell and Eddie Griffin for smaller roles, making them, along with Clay and Chappelle, four comedians cast in the film. Luenell, who had remained friends with Cooper after working with him on All About Steve (2009), appears briefly as a cashier. To strengthen the film's sense of authenticity, Cooper also cast several drag performers, including some he knew from Philadelphia, along with Gaga's dancers, choreographer, and hair and makeup artists, in small roles. Shangela, who plays the drag-bar host, said Gaga encouraged her to audition after learning that she had initially skipped the casting call because the role was described as a Marilyn Monroe drag impersonator. Although Shangela was originally scheduled to film for one day, Cooper and Gaga expanded her and Willam Belli's involvement after their first day on set. Anthony Ramos, who plays Ally's friend Ramon, was one of the final members added to the cast after going through a conventional audition process. Ramos initially submitted a self-taped audition and was asked to record additional takes before flying to Los Angeles for a cast reading, after which he was offered the role. Cooper said he wanted Ramon to have an "internal light" and felt that Ramos naturally embodied the character.

Cooper reunited with his former Alias co-stars Greg Grunberg and Ron Rifkin, casting them as Jackson's driver and rehab therapist, respectively. Grunberg said Cooper approached him personally for the role, which coincidentally echoed his own experience working as producer Joel Silver's driver when he was 19; Cooper similarly contacted Rifkin directly about his role. Cooper also cast figures from his own life in minor roles. His ear specialist, Dr. William Slattery, appears as the doctor who treats Jackson's tinnitus. Cooper's real-life goldendoodle, Charlie, appears as the dog adopted by Ally and Jackson. Cooper said he considered the dog important to depicting Jackson and Ally building a life together, despite concerns from other producers about the additional time required to work with an animal.

=== Writing and characterization ===
The screenplay for A Star Is Born was written by Eric Roth, Will Fetters, and Cooper. Roth said he was initially hesitant to work on a remake of the earlier films, but considered it "a great challenge" and aimed to "stay as true as [he] could to the previous versions" while telling the story "in a more modern and contemporary way." Roth described the writing process as highly collaborative, noting that he and Cooper frequently exchanged and revised scenes during late-night sessions, sometimes writing at "three, four in the morning". He added that Cooper's perspective as a first-time director shaped the development of the screenplay, describing the process as different from his previous collaborations.

Roth joined the project after reading an earlier draft by Fetters and Cooper, suggesting revisions and reworking elements of the script under time pressure from the studio. He later recalled that the writing process ultimately lasted around eight weeks, which was significantly shorter than his usual projects, and that he continued revising material throughout filming. He characterized the collaboration as occasionally contentious but productive, noting that both he and Cooper were "a little prickly about criticism", while emphasizing that such disagreements were part of the creative process. Roth also described Cooper's approach as more spontaneous and open-ended than that of more experienced directors he had worked with, allowing for continuous revisions and an evolving script during production. In developing the screenplay, Roth focused on the central love story as its emotional foundation, noting that its built-in tragic ending aligned with his view that enduring love stories are often defined by obstacles that prevent the characters from remaining together. Cooper said he wanted the film to center on a "broken love story" and to explore unconditional love, abandonment, and the difficulty of basing one's self-worth too heavily on a relationship. According to Howell Taylor, Cooper's version differed from earlier adaptations by presenting Jackson not as a fading star, but as a successful musician still at the height of his career, whose lifelong struggle with addiction and internal turmoil gradually damages his relationship with Ally.

Roth generally avoided tailoring characters to specific actors, instead prioritizing distinct and psychologically grounded voices. In shaping Ally, he advised Gaga to draw inspiration from Cher's performance in Moonstruck (1987), citing a vulnerable quality alongside a character who is both self-assured and, at times, uncertain. Cooper said he wanted Ally to differ from earlier versions of the character by making her not an ingénue, but an artist around 30 confronting the possibility that her career might not happen. Cooper changed Jackson and Ally's first meeting to a drag bar after Gaga told him about performing in similar venues early in her career on Manhattan's Lower East Side. Roth added that the film adopted a more conversational and improvisational approach to dialogue, with Cooper encouraging a style that emphasized immediacy and intimacy.

One of Cooper's major additions to the screenplay was Jackson's relationship with his older half-brother and manager, Bobby, played by Sam Elliott. Cooper described their emotionally restrained dynamic as central to the film, and said he was especially nervous to film Jackson's pivotal admission about Bobby. Elliott's conversations with Cooper about family helped shape Jackson and Bobby's relationship. To develop Jackson's speaking voice, Cooper worked extensively with dialect coach Tim Monich, meeting for about four hours a day, five days a week, over a six-month period. He modeled the character's cadence on Elliott, whose Sacramento upbringing and mother's Texas background gave him what Cooper considered a difficult-to-place "hybrid accent". Cooper connected the choice to Bruce Springsteen's memoir, in which Springsteen described taking on aspects of his father's voice. Cooper said the idea resonated with his own childhood wish to resemble his father, and made him realize he was "trying to become Sam Elliott vocally" for the role. Jackson's hearing problems also drew partly on Cooper's own experiences. Cooper was born with a cholesteatoma and underwent several operations for recurring ear problems, which he said gave him an understanding of hearing loss and the ringing associated with tinnitus. He developed the idea of giving Jackson hearing loss while spending time with musicians, recalling that Pearl Jam's Eddie Vedder may have suggested it as a physical manifestation of the toll of performing.

=== Direction ===
Cooper emphasized emotional authenticity in directing the actors, saying that the film's personal details were meant to make the story feel more truthful. He generally avoided rehearsing scenes before filming, preferring to capture the actors' initial performances, an approach influenced by Clint Eastwood's advice to "always shoot rehearsal". He made an exception for Gaga, delaying production by two months because he felt they were not yet ready to tell the story; during that period, she worked with acting coaches Elizabeth Kemp and Susan Batson, including exercises with Batson rather than rehearsing individual scenes. On Gaga's first day of filming, Cooper deliberately departed from the scripted dialogue in an effort to loosen her up and move her away from relying on memorized lines. Gaga initially struggled with the improvisation, but said the experience taught her to "let go of the words" and helped her understand the film's more spontaneous and emotionally immediate acting style; the two subsequently developed a shorthand in which Cooper used particular words and personal associations to prompt specific emotions during scenes.

Cooper said that acting while directing helped him remain immersed with the performers and maintain the rhythm of scenes, rather than making the dual role more difficult. He hoped the other actors would feel that he was taking the same emotional risks alongside them. During emotionally difficult scenes, Cooper preferred to remain physically close to the actors rather than direct from video monitors, believing that proximity made performers more willing to take risks. Gaga said this sense of trust shaped her confrontational scenes with Cooper, in which she felt both afraid and supported while acting opposite him.

Cooper sought to create an environment in which the cast felt comfortable being vulnerable; Dave Chappelle said Cooper's approach enabled him to access a degree of vulnerability he had not found in comedy, while Sam Elliott similarly recalled reaching unfamiliar emotional territory during Bobby and Jackson's confrontation. For Jackson's most inebriated moments, including the Grammy Awards sequence, Cooper remained partly in character while directing. Elliott recalled that after filming Jackson's confession to Bobby, Cooper finished the take, picked up a monitor, and immediately resumed directing; Elliott described the moment as watching "Bradley-actor" shift into "Bradley-director".

=== Filming and production design ===
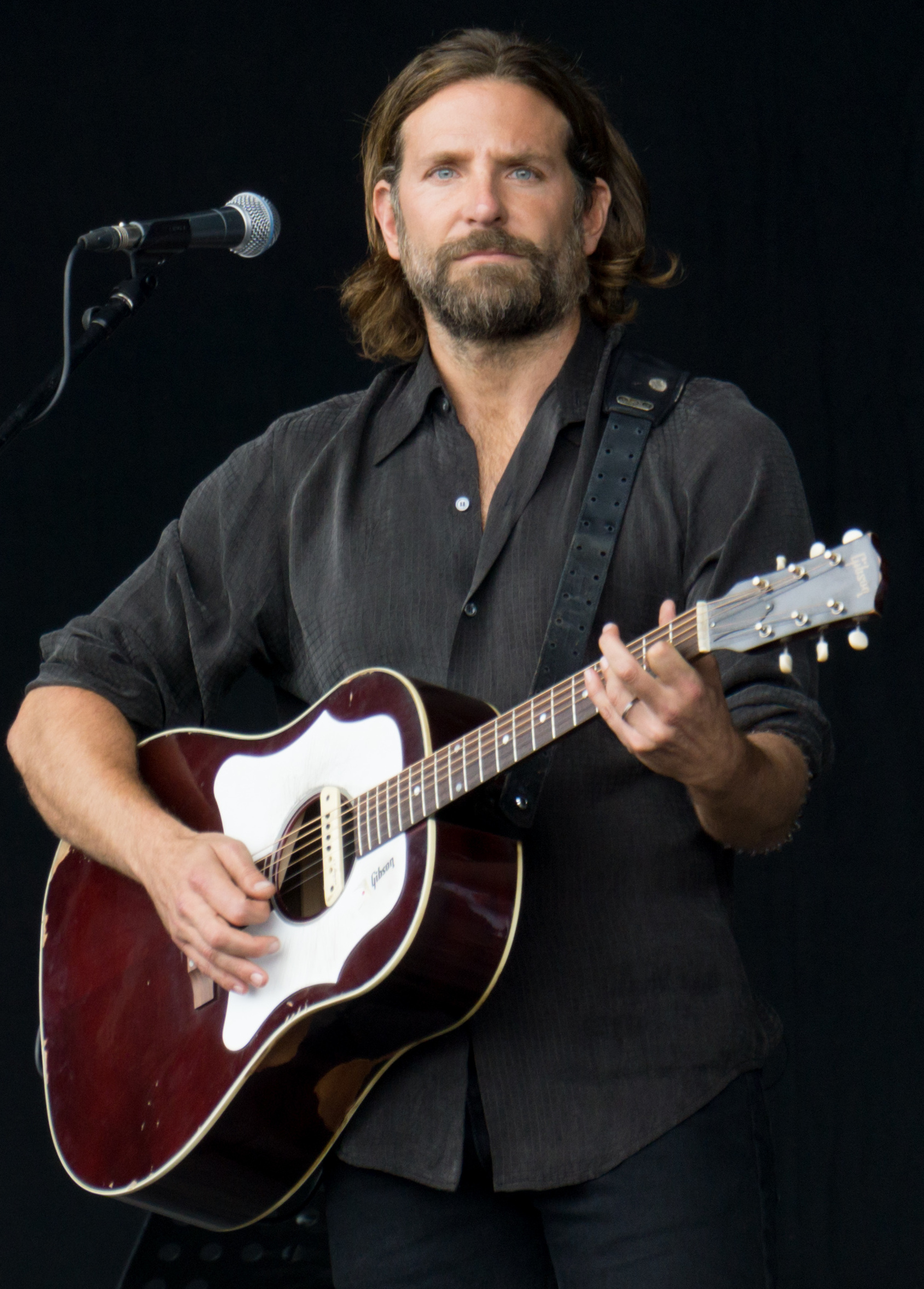
Bradley Cooper filmed during a concert scene for A Star Is Born at the 2017 Glastonbury Festival

Principal photography for A Star Is Born commenced on April 17, 2017, and lasted 42 days. The production emphasized authenticity by filming concert scenes at actual music festivals with live audiences. After seeing Terrence Malick's Song to Song (2017), Cooper contacted Malick about his use of real music festivals during production; the conversation reinforced Cooper's decision to film on actual concert stages during live events. Production designer Karen Murphy similarly said that real venues allowed the filmmakers to capture backstage areas, equipment and other details that would have been difficult to reproduce convincingly on soundstages. Existing festival stages were modified to represent different stops on Jackson and Ally's tours. The film's opening performance was shot at the Stagecoach Festival in Indio, California, between acts by Jamey Johnson and Willie Nelson, with the crew given only eight minutes to set up and film each scene. Additional concert sequences were filmed at Coachella and Glastonbury festivals. Lady Gaga headlined Coachella while also filming scenes for the film, allowing the production extended access to the festival grounds. Glastonbury scenes were filmed before a crowd of around 80,000, with Kris Kristofferson allowing the production a brief four-minute slot during his set to film on stage. Cooper said that performing live in front of large festival audiences was initially daunting but helped reinforce the film's commitment to authenticity once filming began.

The first onstage performance of "Shallow" was filmed at the Greek Theatre in Los Angeles, standing in for a Northern California venue. Most of the extras were Gaga fans recruited for the shoot, and Cooper, Gaga, Lukas Nelson and Promise of the Real performed several songs for the audience. The Grammy Awards sequence and the final performance of "I'll Never Love Again" were both filmed at the Shrine Auditorium in Los Angeles. The latter was shot at the same venue where Judy Garland filmed "The Man That Got Away" for the 1954 version of A Star Is Born. According to producer Bill Gerber, the connection was not the sole reason for choosing the venue, but gave the scene "poetic resonance". Murphy's team constructed the Grammy Awards set at the Shrine before dismantling it and transforming the venue for Ally's final performance. Cooper reworked the latter set-up with Murphy on the morning of the shoot. Multiple versions of the song were prepared in different tempos and keys so Gaga's performance could be adjusted during the shoot. While preparing to film the final performance of "I'll Never Love Again", Gaga learned that her close friend Sonja Durham, who had been battling cancer, was nearing death. She left the set but returned to film the scene later that same day, after Durham had died. Gaga later said that she took the experience back to the set and performed the song for both Jackson and Durham.

Additional scenes were filmed at Saturday Night Live using its actual studio, crew, and equipment, with permission from Lorne Michaels, creator and producer of the show. Cooper chose to film these sequences on the program's actual stage because he wanted to depict Ally's rise without relying on a conventional montage, viewing Saturday Night Live as a recognizable marker of mainstream success. Although the production used the actual studio, Murphy's team constructed the set for Ally's performance. The drag-bar scenes were filmed at The Virgil, a small club in downtown Los Angeles that Murphy transformed into the fictional venue Bleu Bleu. Willam Belli said Cooper gave the drag performers freedom to improvise, while Belli and Shangela adjusted small dressing-room details, including makeup products, to make the setting appear more authentic. Scenes showing Ally's commercial success were filmed at the Chateau Marmont on Sunset Boulevard in West Hollywood, where Jackson speaks to her about remaining true to herself after a billboard advertising Ally appears nearby.

Murphy designed the characters' homes to reflect their backgrounds. Jackson's secluded residence was furnished around his musical life and Arizona upbringing, with several rooms devoted to music and objects suggesting items he had collected while touring. Ally's family home, by contrast, was given an East Coast character despite its Los Angeles setting, reflecting her life with her father before achieving success.

=== Cinematography ===
Cooper and cinematographer Matthew Libatique sought to place the camera on stage with the performers, using a documentary-like perspective intended to align viewers with Ally and Jackson and immerse them in the experience of performing live. Libatique said each performance was approached like a narrative dialogue scene rather than a conventional music-video sequence. The approach drew on Cooper's experience observing concerts from backstage, including a stadium show at Yankee Stadium as Lars Ulrich's guest, which helped shape their decision to film performances from the stage rather than from a proscenium-style audience viewpoint. In preparation, Libatique watched Rock Star (2001) and the concert film Stop Making Sense (1984), and attended live shows to study performance lighting.

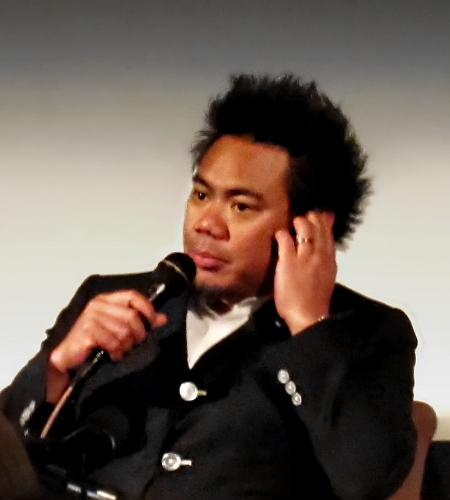
Cinematographer Matthew Libatique used close camera placement and stage-level perspectives to emphasize the intimacy of the film's musical performances.

Cooper and Libatique employed a naturalistic visual style, using handheld cameras and natural lighting to create an intimate atmosphere, with their visual decisions guided by a collaborative focus on authenticity and tone. Because Cooper was a first-time director, Libatique kept the lighting comparatively simple, using broad lighting patterns and a restrained color palette to allow actor movement and improvisation while reducing technical complications. Libatique attributed the film's intimacy to keeping the actors close to the lens, rather than relying on traditional shot lists. He said Cooper had specific ideas about entering and leaving scenes, while camera placement was chosen to maximize emotional impact. As Cooper was often acting while directing, Libatique said he sometimes had to make composition and shot decisions independently, while the camera operators also took on more responsibility than usual. Libatique also wanted Gaga to feel protected while portraying Ally's vulnerability, and framed her frequently in close-up, including extreme close-up, with lighting designed so she could perform without having to worry about finding the light or camera position. The film avoided traditional shot coverage in some dramatic scenes, instead choosing camera positions based on emotional emphasis and composition.

Libatique described red as a recurring visual motif connecting Jackson and Ally, first established in Jackson's performance world and later returning during Ally's "La Vie en rose" and "Shallow" performances, before disappearing near the end in favor of a white light associated with sobriety. He said the lighting palette was designed to reflect Jackson's descent and Ally's ascent: Jackson's world initially made Ally appear small within the scale of his performances, while the colors of his touring environment later informed the look of "Pop Ally", culminating in the neutral white light of the final scene. Libatique preferred to establish the film's color palette on set rather than substantially alter it in post-production, saying he wanted the dailies to reflect the intended look. In recording-studio scenes where smoke could not be used because of the equipment, Libatique used a Color-Con filter to bleed color into the shadows and imitate the softness created by atmosphere elsewhere in the film.

Most of the concert scenes were filmed during the first weeks of production, which helped establish the film's visual approach before the later dramatic scenes were shot. Libatique operated much of the musical material himself, often using handheld cameras for the concert scenes and low angles during Jackson's guitar solos so Cooper's playing remained visible. During real festival shoots, the crew often worked with only one or two cameras because of the limited time available on stage. Libatique used the same cameras as elsewhere in the film, but relied on existing lighting rigs at the venues, which his team adjusted to maintain visual consistency with the controlled concert scenes.

Libatique used Cooke Anamorphic/i SF prime lenses as the film's base lens package, while switching to Kowa anamorphic lenses for a rougher look, particularly during tight performance shots of Cooper and Gaga on stage. The film was shot on Arri Alexa Mini cameras, which Libatique chose for their modularity, while the production avoided overly elaborate equipment so Cooper and Gaga could move and improvise freely.

=== Makeup and hairstyling ===
Makeup artist Sarah Tanno described Ally's appearance as the result of a "meticulous" daily process, which included covering all of Gaga's tattoos to make her "completely different" from her public image. At the request of Gaga and Cooper, the character was initially presented with a minimal, "raw" look using only basic products such as brow gel and lip balm. For Ally's "La Vie en rose" performance, her Édith Piaf-inspired makeup includes taped-on eyebrows, which Jackson later removes backstage; Vanity Fair linked the moment to recurring eyebrow and makeover motifs in earlier A Star Is Born films. Gaga's longtime hairstylist Frederic Aspiras styled Ally's hair using Gaga's own hair rather than wigs, which he said helped transform her into the character. Gaga dyed her hair back to its natural color for the role, describing the change, along with wearing little makeup, as part of exposing herself physically and emotionally for the character. She said she began making these changes months before filming to distance herself from her public image and better inhabit Ally. As Ally's career progresses, her makeup was gradually developed to appear more polished and self-applied, with new shapes, brighter eyeshadow and lipstick, and a shift from brunette to orange hair marking her transformation into a more manufactured pop star.

Makeup department head Ve Neill developed Jackson's weathered appearance through daily tanning, including full-body spray tans every other week, supplemented by gray-green and red tones around Cooper's eyes and menthol to create a bloodshot, glassy-eyed effect. Neill said the increasing ruddiness of Jackson's complexion was intended to correspond with his drug and alcohol use. Neill also created a temporary tattoo for Jackson based on a drawing by Cooper, depicting the "Kilroy was here" figure; she said the design was conceived as an homage to Jackson's father. Hairstylist Lori McCoy-Bell designed Jackson's hair to immediately convey his rock-star persona while remaining soft enough for Cooper to run his hands through it and tuck it behind his ears; she said he used these gestures to add nuance to the character. McCoy-Bell contrasted the relatively subtle changes in Jackson's hair and skin when he was sober with Ally's more pronounced transformation as her career progressed, saying their diverging appearances were intended to reflect the growing distance between them and describing Ally's return to her natural brown hair in the final scene as bringing her look "full circle".

=== Costume design ===
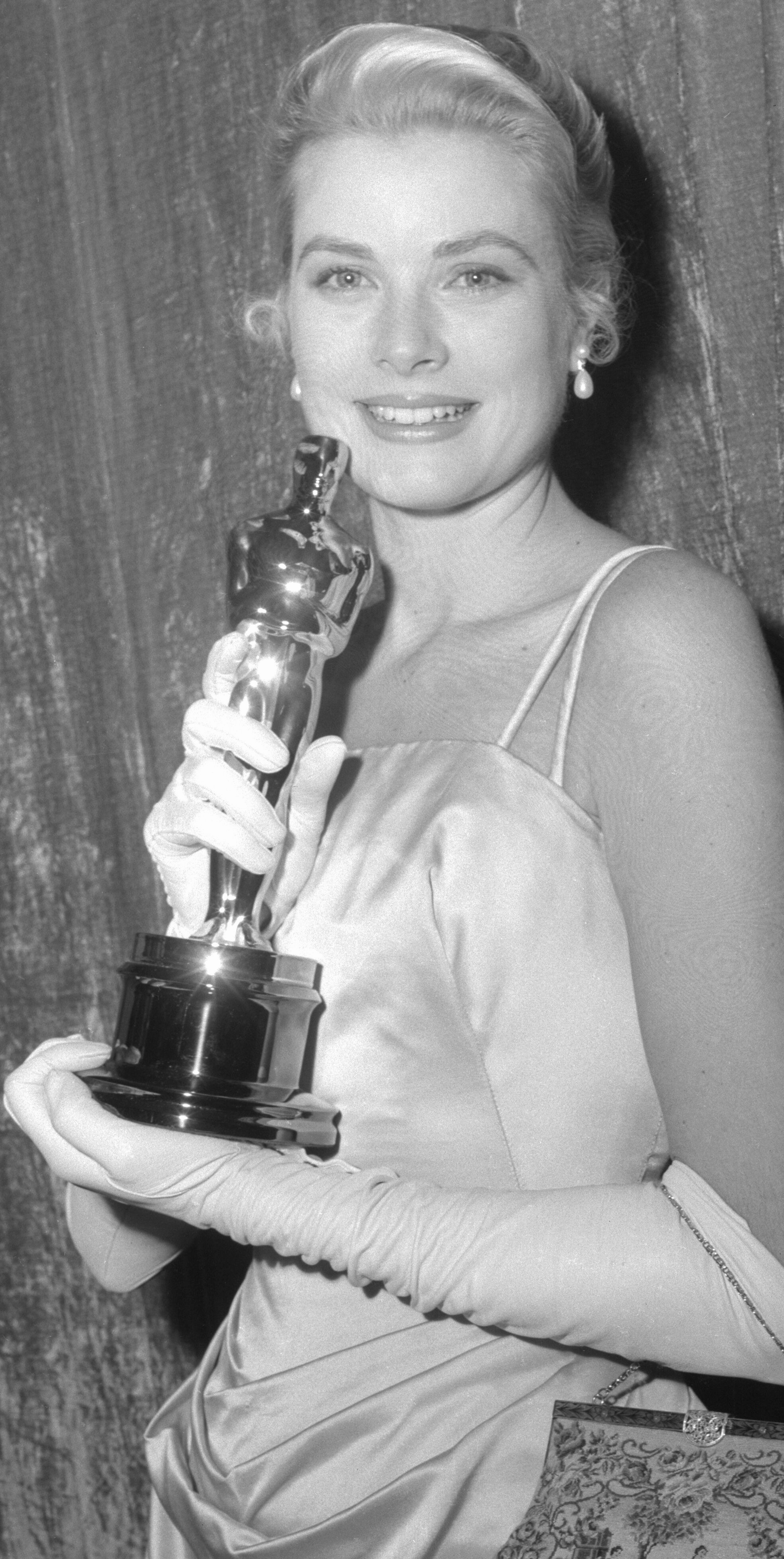
Grace Kelly in an Edith Head gown at the 1955 Academy Awards. The dress served as inspiration for Ally's attire during the film's final performance.

As with Ally's makeup and hairstyling, costume designer Erin Benach approached Ally's wardrobe as a reflection of her narrative arc, aiming to "personify the different beats" of her development from an aspiring musician to an established pop star. In the film's early scenes, Ally is presented in understated, everyday clothing—such as jeans and leather pants—to emphasize her anonymity and relatability, with the designers deliberately avoiding elements associated with Gaga's public image. For her introduction at a drag bar, Benach opted for a minimalist black dress rather than a more elaborate "drag" costume, a last-minute change made after observing the club's setting and performers, as the simpler look allowed Ally to stand out among the surrounding drag performers.

As Ally begins touring with Jackson, her wardrobe incorporates vintage and thrifted pieces inspired by her surroundings, reflecting her gradual immersion into his world. Benach noted that Ally's style shifts from her Los Angeles city life toward Jackson's country rock aesthetic, with the character acquiring clothing that reflects his influence while remaining consistent with her own identity. Although some outfits were designed to appear vintage, certain pieces—such as leopard print pants—were sourced from contemporary fashion brands. Benach sourced garments from vintage shops in Los Angeles and Long Beach, drawing on styles from the 1970s and 1980s, including Western-inspired shirts and dresses with fringe details. Vanity Fair interpreted Ally's wedding dress as a nod to Barbra Streisand's bohemian bridal look in the 1976 version of A Star Is Born. The costume team also created custom pieces for key performances, including an embroidered white jumpsuit worn during Ally's performance of "Always Remember Us This Way".

Later, as Ally achieves commercial success, her costumes shift toward more stylized and experimental pop aesthetics, representing a phase in which the character is "trying different looks" as she develops her stage persona. Benach said Gaga contributed ideas to the development of Ally's wardrobe as the character began working with stylists and dressing for public appearances. Her performance outfits also reflect her emerging pop image, including a sparkly crop top and transparent cargo pants worn during her Saturday Night Live appearance, with Benach citing runway trends and 1990s girl groups such as Destiny's Child as influences. To develop costumes suited to Ally's dance performances, Benach attended Gaga's choreography rehearsals, drawing inspiration from the movements and music to inform her designs.

As Ally's career progresses, her wardrobe incorporates increasingly elaborate stage and award-show attire, including a custom gold gown created by Gucci for the film's Grammy Awards sequence. For the film's finale, Benach and her team designed a robin egg blue gown for Ally's performance of "I'll Never Love Again", inspired by Grace Kelly's 1955 Academy Awards dress, which was designed by Edith Head. The understated design was intended to avoid distracting from the emotional impact of the scene, with Benach noting that "as soon as you put a really strong design on her, it just took away from the moment". She added that the dress's pale color was chosen to stand out against the dark stage and to convey hopefulness rather than sadness. Benach also emphasized a "timeless" approach to the film's costume design, avoiding direct imitation of contemporary pop stars in order to create a more universal and enduring visual identity.

For Jackson, Benach based the character's wardrobe on his musical identity, initially experimenting with a more overt rock-inspired style before refining it to better align with his sound. She ultimately developed a consistent "uniform" for the character, emphasizing a "sexy" and "effortless" aesthetic through carefully curated garments. Many of his costumes were custom-made to appear casual and unstyled, including modified vintage-inspired pieces such as button-down shirts, reinforcing a consistent and unchanging personal style. Cooper also wanted Jackson's hat to invert a common country-music convention: rather than putting it on for performance, Jackson wears it offstage and removes it when performing, exposing him at his most vulnerable.

=== Music and sound ===
==== Live recording and sound design ====
Recording the film's concert sequences required an unusually complex setup. Gaga and Cooper wanted to avoid traditional lip-syncing, instead recording the vocals live on set to preserve the spontaneity of the performances. During pre-production, production sound mixer Steve Morrow's team tested the method with a mini-concert and settled on having the band perform to playback while the lead vocals were captured live. To prevent the film's music from leaking during public festival shoots, the performers heard the music through small earpieces or low-level monitors rather than amplified speakers, leaving most audience members unable to hear the performances. Morrow's team individually miked the band, recorded crowd and venue ambience, and used as many as 61 separate audio tracks during the most complex scenes. The production also recorded impulse responses and mapped performance spaces so the studio-recorded instrumentation could be matched to the acoustics of each venue in post-production.

Sound designer Alan Robert Murray said the film used volume and background noise to distinguish between Jackson and Ally's public and private worlds. Concert scenes were contrasted with quieter dramatic moments in which background noise was reduced so that dialogue and ambience became more prominent. For Jackson's Grammy Awards breakdown, the sound design shifts between the audience's applause and Jackson's distorted perception, incorporating ringing tones and muffled voices to reflect his tinnitus and confusion. Murray shared that the sound team researched tinnitus and used hearing-test tones to develop the effect.

==== Soundtrack ====
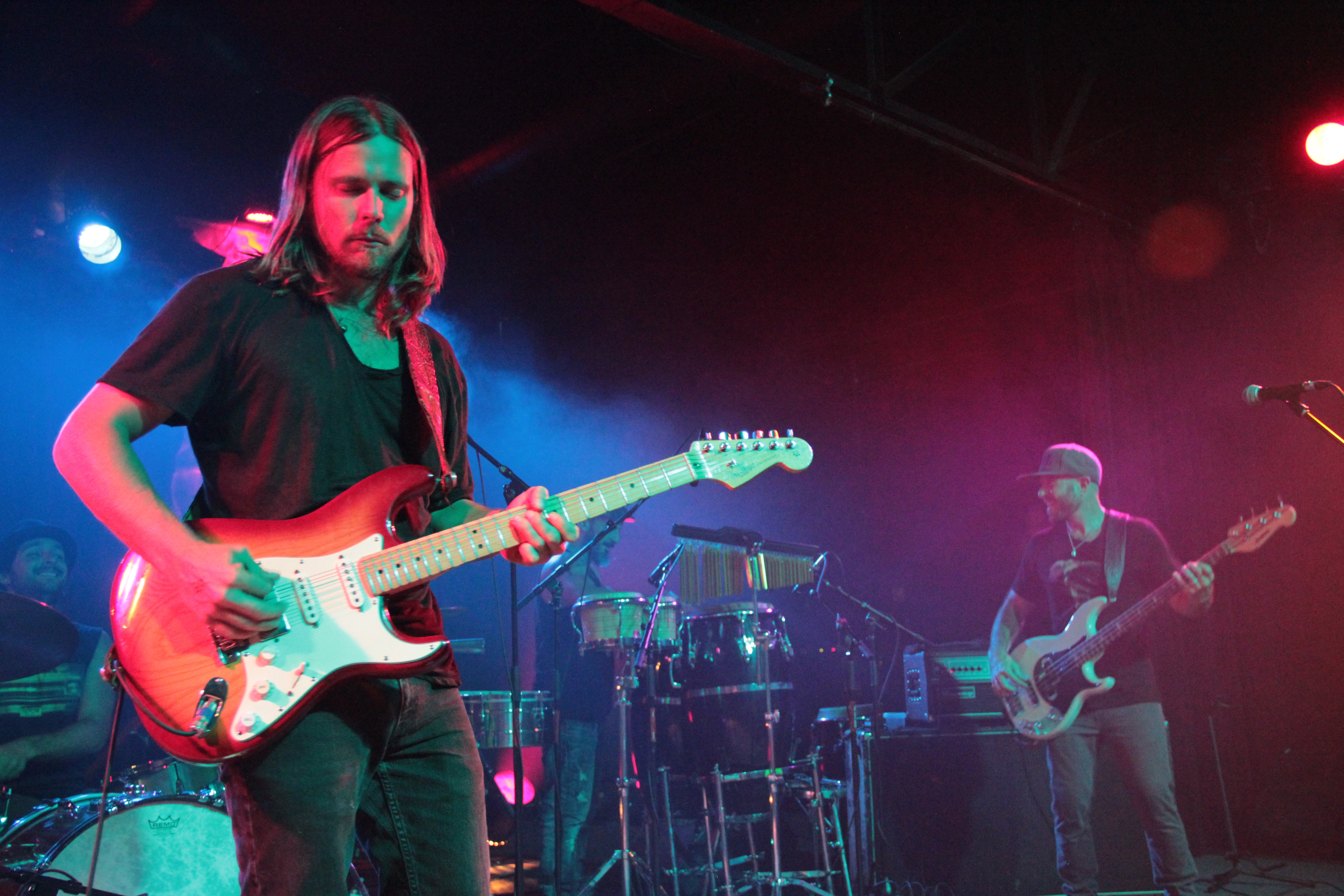
Lukas Nelson helped write material for the soundtrack, while his band, Promise of the Real, portrayed Jackson's backing band in the film.

After seeing him perform at Desert Trip festival, Cooper approached Lukas Nelson and asked him to help work on the film. Nelson subsequently contributed several songs and later collaborated with Lady Gaga on additional material. During pre-production, Cooper undertook an intensive period of musical training, including daily guitar and piano practice and vocal coaching with Roger Love, while also working closely with Nelson on songwriting. The project further involved collaborators such as Mark Ronson, Hillary Lindsey, Jason Isbell, and Diane Warren, who contributed to the songwriting and production. Music supervisors Julia Michels and Julianne Jordan had sought to work on the project since its earlier incarnation with Clint Eastwood and Beyoncé and became involved early in Cooper's version. Michels recalled hearing Gaga perform material at her kitchen table during the early stages of the songwriting process.

Songs for the soundtrack were written during filming and evolved alongside the screenplay, with the music closely tied to the film's narrative and character development. As an example, "Shallow" was initially conceived as a solo end-credits track for Ally in an earlier version of the story, in which Jackson dies by drowning—a concept that informed the song's imagery—before being reworked into a central duet between the protagonists. The filmmakers opted to prioritize original songs over covers, with the exception of "La Vie en rose" and "Over the Rainbow". During early script readings, Lady Gaga performed songs live, helping to shape the film's musical direction. Cooper described the music as a "character" in the film, stating that no lyric was included unless it related directly to where the characters were emotionally, what they hoped for, or what they regretted.

A Star Is Born's music was issued on an accompanying soundtrack album on October 5, 2018, by Interscope Records. The release also includes fuller versions of songs heard only briefly in the film, as well as "Before I Cry", which did not make the final cut. The soundtrack received positive reviews from critics, and went on to rank among the best-selling albums of 2019 worldwide, selling millions of copies. Preceding its release, "Shallow" was issued as the lead single, receiving critical acclaim and topping the charts in multiple countries. Gaga and Cooper later performed the song together at the 91st Academy Awards.

==== Song placement ====
External videos
- Music video of the song "Shallow", featuring clips from the film on YouTube

"Black Eyes" is performed by Jackson during the film's opening concert sequence. Ally hums the preamble to "Over the Rainbow" while walking up a ramp from her job as the film's title appears on screen; the moment serves as an homage to Judy Garland, who starred in 1954's A Star Is Born. At the drag bar where Jackson first meets her, Ally performs a cover of "La Vie en rose"; while waiting for her backstage, he sings the acoustic ballad "Maybe It's Time" in the same venue. "Shallow" appears three times in the film and is used to reflect the protagonists' relationship and emotional progression. "Too Far Gone" and "Diggin' My Grave" are briefly heard in Jackson-centered studio and soundcheck scenes, respectively. "Alibi" is performed by Jackson as Ally arrives at the theater to meet and perform with him onstage for the first time, while "Music to My Eyes" appears during the pair's motorcycle trip to Arizona. After Jackson recruits Ally for his tour, he encourages her to perform one of her original songs, "Always Remember Us This Way", as their encore; he later has a piano brought to the studio so she can record "Look What I Found". "I Don't Know What Love Is" accompanies Jackson and Ally's impromptu wedding. "Heal Me", "Hair Body Face" and "Why Did You Do That?" mark Ally's transition into commercial pop stardom, with the latter performed during her Saturday Night Live appearance, underscoring Jackson's discomfort with her new musical direction. In the film's final sequence, Ally performs "I'll Never Love Again" before a large audience, intercut with an intimate scene of Jackson singing the song to her at home. "Is That Alright?" plays over the film's end credits as Ally's pledge to Jackson.

=== Choreography ===
Lady Gaga's longtime collaborator Richy Jackson choreographed the dance sequences in A Star Is Born and also portrayed Ally's choreographer in the film. Jackson sought to distinguish Ally's movements from Gaga's established performance style, developing choreography that reflected the character's individual musical identity. For Ally's performance of "Why Did You Do That?" on Saturday Night Live, Gaga requested a "jerky" style of movement, which Jackson developed into a routine influenced by 1990s pop and R&B. He also choreographed "Heal Me", incorporating relaxed movements and raised hands to accompany Ally's first performance of her own pop material. Choreography was additionally created for "Hair Body Face", part of which appears briefly during a rehearsal scene.

=== Editing ===
Editor Jay Cassidy said the film's guiding editorial principle was to "stay with the singer", avoiding excessive cutting during musical performances. Each song was edited according to its narrative function, with major numbers such as "Shallow" allowed to play longer while others were shortened once they had served the story. Because the production filmed numerous songs, including some in multiple locations and concert settings, the editors worked from a large library of musical material rather than a conventional first cut. The first version reviewed was about 25 minutes longer, with extended scenes and additional material later removed or simplified to clarify the narrative. The editing team also worked with early music mixes, allowing Cooper to review even rough assemblies with developed sound rather than waiting for later post-production stages.

Cooper repeatedly screened cuts for small groups of trusted collaborators, using their reactions to determine whether scenes were being interpreted as intended and to guide further experimentation. After preview screenings had been completed, the editing team used several additional weeks before rerecording to revisit the original dailies; Cassidy said that two scenes were completely recut using different takes from those that had remained in the film for the previous six months. Libatique recalled seeing several early cuts as Cooper worked to find the film's rhythm. He said the amount of musical material required Cooper to reduce the film to the "bare essence" of the love story while preserving the parallel structure of Ally's rise and Jackson's decline.

Cassidy said "Black Eyes" established Jackson's musical world, the scale of his performances, and the film's use of songs as story functions. For "La Vie en rose", the editing minimized Jackson's reactions so the audience would see Ally largely as he sees her, while "Shallow" was structured as a "pied piper's call" drawing Ally from backstage to the microphone. The final performance of "I'll Never Love Again" became simpler over successive edits, ultimately using only three cuts separated by two flashbacks.

== Release ==
=== Marketing ===
A Star Is Born's first trailer was released on June 6, 2018. It previewed original music from the film, opening with Jackson's performance of "Maybe It's Time" and closing with Ally singing "Shallow" after he invites her onstage. The trailer reportedly drew 70 million views in its first week. An official poster was released alongside the trailer, depicting Cooper and Gaga smiling and leaning their heads together in a monochrome photograph, with the film's title in gold lettering. The design was created by Concept Arts.

Later that month, Cooper promoted the film at CineEurope in Barcelona, where Warner Bros. screened the trailer and premiered the film's first eight minutes for exhibitors. Warner Bros. also partnered with Spotify on a promotional video advertisement using 3D sound, designed to mimic the surround-sound experience of watching the film in a theater with headphones. The studio's worldwide marketing and release expenses were estimated at $110 million, covering its festival rollout, theatrical promotion, and awards campaign.

=== Theatrical release ===
A Star Is Born had its world premiere at the 75th Venice International Film Festival on August 31, 2018. The movie also screened at the Toronto International Film Festival, the San Sebastián International Film Festival, and the Zurich Film Festival in September 2018.

The film was theatrically released in the United States on October 5, 2018, distributed by Warner Bros. Pictures. It was originally scheduled for September 28, 2018, before being moved up to May 18 and subsequently delayed to October 5. It opened day-and-date with North America in 31 international markets, with its initial rollout centered on the United Kingdom, France, Germany, Spain and Russia. The international rollout continued the following week in South Korea, Italy, Brazil and Mexico, with Australia later in October and Japan on December 21. Beginning December 7, 2018, the film received a one-week limited engagement in select IMAX theaters across the United States and Canada. The screenings included The Road to Stardom, an exclusive behind-the-scenes look at the film's production featuring Cooper and Gaga.

On February 28, 2019, the film was re-released in more than 1,150 US theaters as a special "Encore" edition, featuring twelve minutes of additional footage. The extended cut includes longer musical sequences, such as Jackson Maine's opening performance of "Black Eyes", an added a cappella portion of "Shallow" sung by Ally in the parking lot, a brief duet of "Diggin' My Grave", Jackson and Ally writing the song "Clover", and a tour-bus performance of "Midnight Special". The edition also adds "Is That Alright?" to the wedding reception sequence, where Ally performs the song for Jackson after their marriage. Other additions include further domestic scenes between Jackson and Ally, more dialogue from Noodles, Jackson recording "Too Far Gone", Ally discussing tour costumes with Rez, an expanded Grammys rehearsal sequence with Marlon Williams, and a longer scene of Ally visiting Jackson in rehab.

=== Home media ===
The film became available for digital download through retailers on January 15, 2019, followed by its release on Blu-ray, DVD and 4K Ultra HD Blu-ray on February 19. The home video release features 10 minutes of musical performances that were cut from the theatrical version of the film, and jam recording sessions of songs like "Midnight Special", "Is That Alright?" and "Baby What You Want Me to Do". The home video release also included the behind-the-scenes featurette The Road to Stardom, along with the four music videos. The 4K Blu-ray format has Dolby Vision high-dynamic-range video and remixed Dolby Atmos sound that was tailored specifically for home viewing systems.

In April 2019, Warner Bros. Home Entertainment announced that A Star Is Born: Special Encore Edition would be available on June 4. It includes both the original theatrical version and the extended "Encore" cut. Unlike the initial home media edition, it was not issued on 4K Ultra HD. The film was later bundled with the soundtrack as part of the A Star Is Born – VIP Pass Edition, released on November 25, 2019. This edition includes both versions of the film on Blu-ray, the soundtrack on CD, three limited-edition posters, a 32-page booklet, and six exclusive art cards. Additional bundle editions combining the film and soundtrack were also issued in select markets.

The film had its television debut in the United States on June 8, 2019, on HBO, and became available for streaming through HBO Go and HBO Now on the same day. It was later included in the launch library of HBO Max when the service debuted on May 27, 2020.

== Reception ==
=== Box office ===
A Star Is Born grossed $215.3 million in the United States and Canada, and $224.6 million in other territories, for a total worldwide gross of $439.9 million, against a production budget of $36 million. Deadline Hollywood calculated the net profit of the film to be $178.1 million, when factoring together all expenses and revenues, making it the tenth most profitable release of 2018.

In the United States and Canada, A Star Is Born grossed $1.35 million from select Tuesday and Wednesday night screenings, and $15.8 million on its first day, including $3.2 million from Thursday night previews. It went on to debut to $42.9 million for the weekend and finished second at the box office, behind fellow newcomer Venom. The film remained in second place in its second, third and fourth weekends, grossing $28 million, $19.3 million and $14.1 million, respectively. Scott Mendelson of Forbes cited A Star Is Born and Bohemian Rhapsody as rare examples of adult-skewing Oscar-season releases that became breakout commercial hits in 2018, arguing that A Star Is Born absorbed much of the October audience for adult-oriented films while several other awards contenders underperformed. In the film's tenth weekend of release, following the announcement of its five Golden Globe nominations, the film made $2.5 million (up 38% from the previous week), including $800,000 from a limited IMAX run. In the film's 17th week of release, following its eight Oscar nominations, it was added back to an additional 777 theaters (for a total of 1,192) and made $1.2 million, an increase of 108% from the previous weekend. The weekend following its Best Original Song win at the Oscars, the film expanded to 1,235 theaters, an increase of 490 from the previous weekend, and grossed $1.9 million, a 204% increase.

Outside North America, the film was released concurrently in 31 other countries, and made $14.2 million in its opening weekend; its largest markets were the United Kingdom ($5.3 million), France ($2.1 million) and Germany ($1.9 million). Additional countries followed, with Japan not seeing a release until December 21. The film displayed particularly strong holds in the United Kingdom, where it rose to first place in its second weekend without declining from its opening-weekend gross, and remained atop the box office the following week. In Australia, it debuted at number one with $4.8 million, which Screen Daily reported as Warner Bros.' largest opening in the market that year to that point. By the end of its theatrical run, its largest international markets included the United Kingdom ($38.0 million), Australia ($23.7 million), France ($17.2 million), Japan ($13.4 million) and Germany ($10.6 million).

=== Critical response ===
On the review aggregator website Rotten Tomatoes, 90% of 549 critics' reviews are positive, with an average rating of 8.1/10. The website's consensus reads: "With appealing leads, deft direction, and an affecting love story, A Star Is Born is a remake done right—and a reminder that some stories can be just as effective in the retelling." On Metacritic, the film has a weighted average score of 88 out of 100, based on 60 critics, indicating "universal acclaim". Audiences polled by CinemaScore gave the film an average grade of "A" on an A+ to F scale, while PostTrak reported that filmgoers gave it a 90% positive score and an average of 4.5 out of 5 stars.

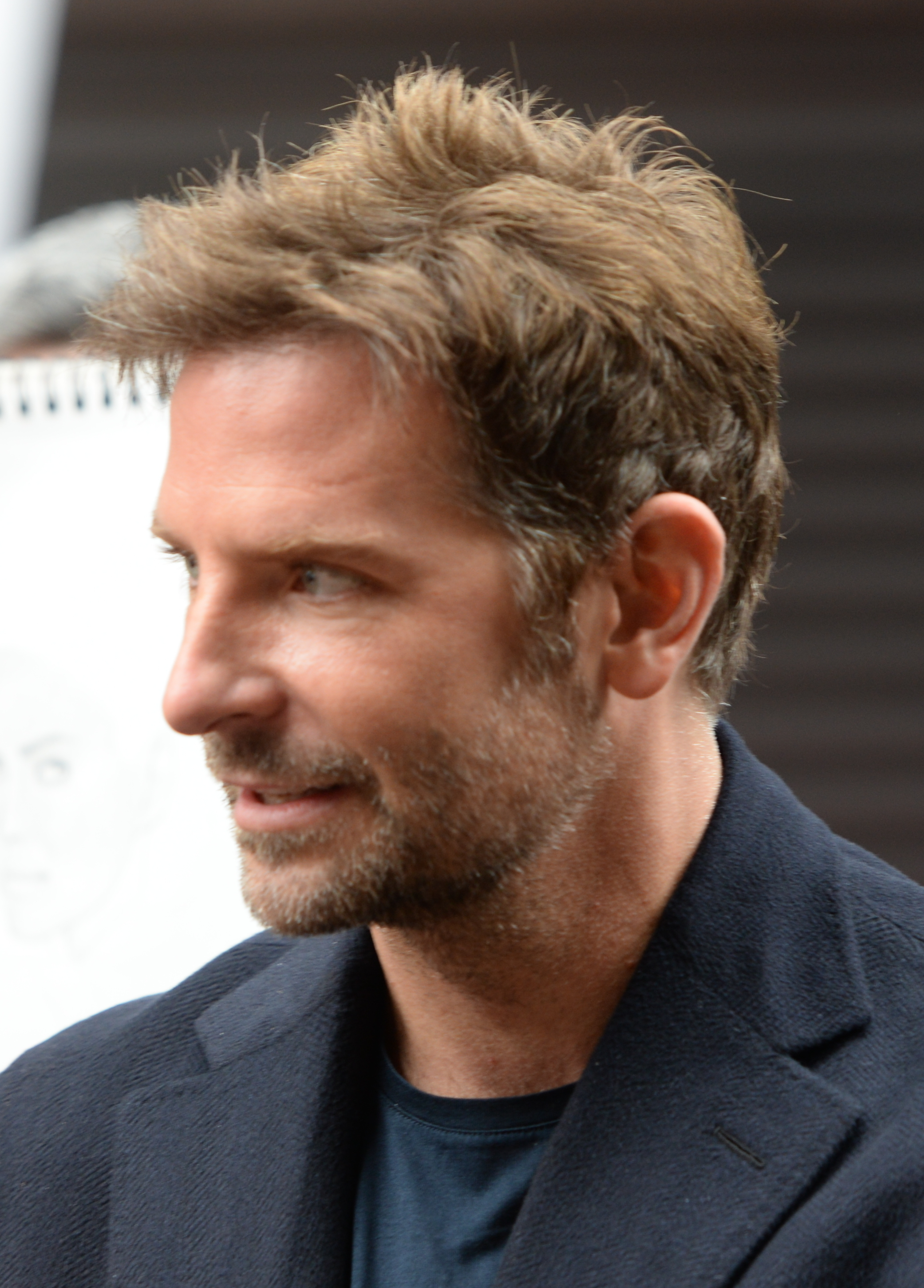
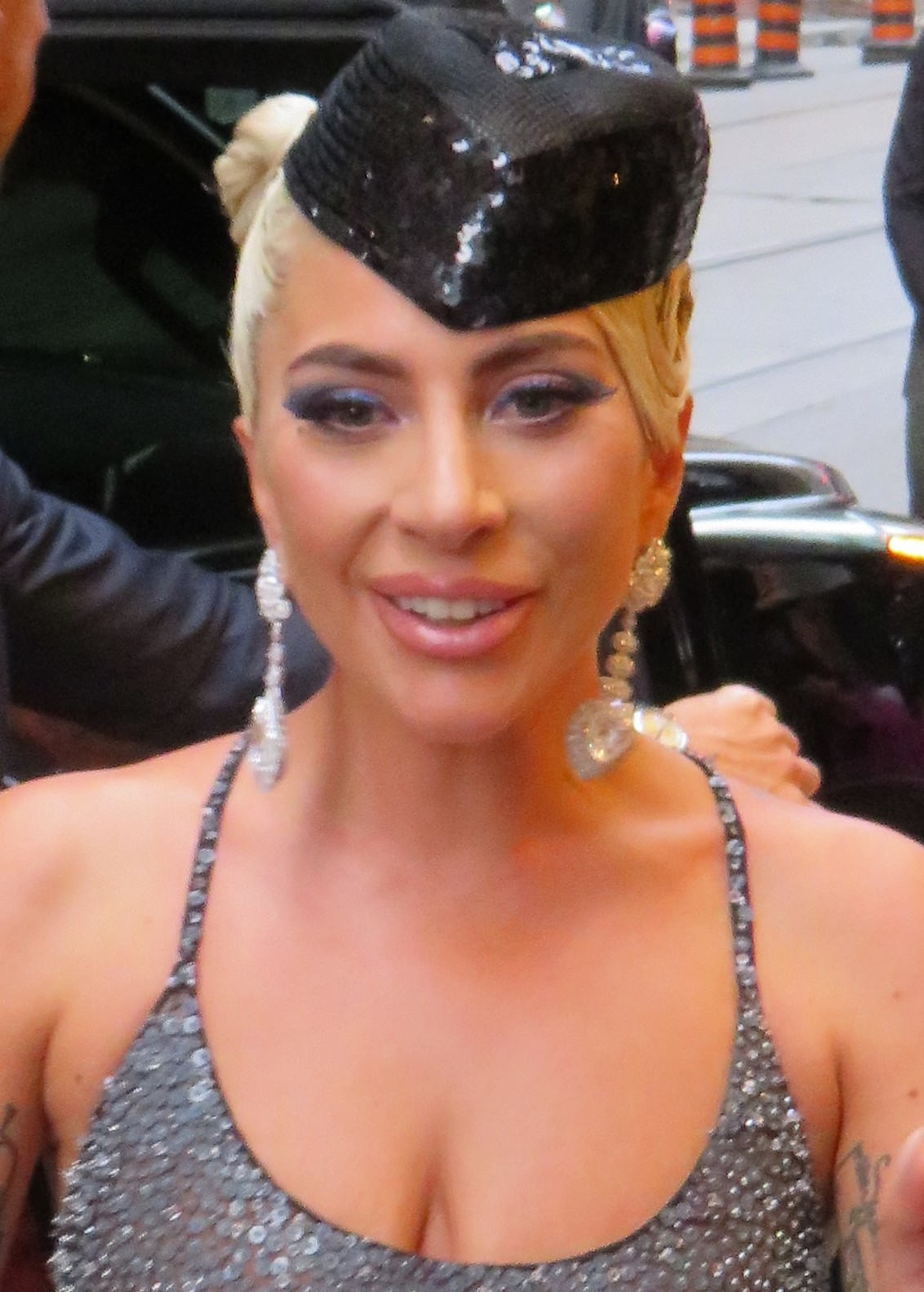
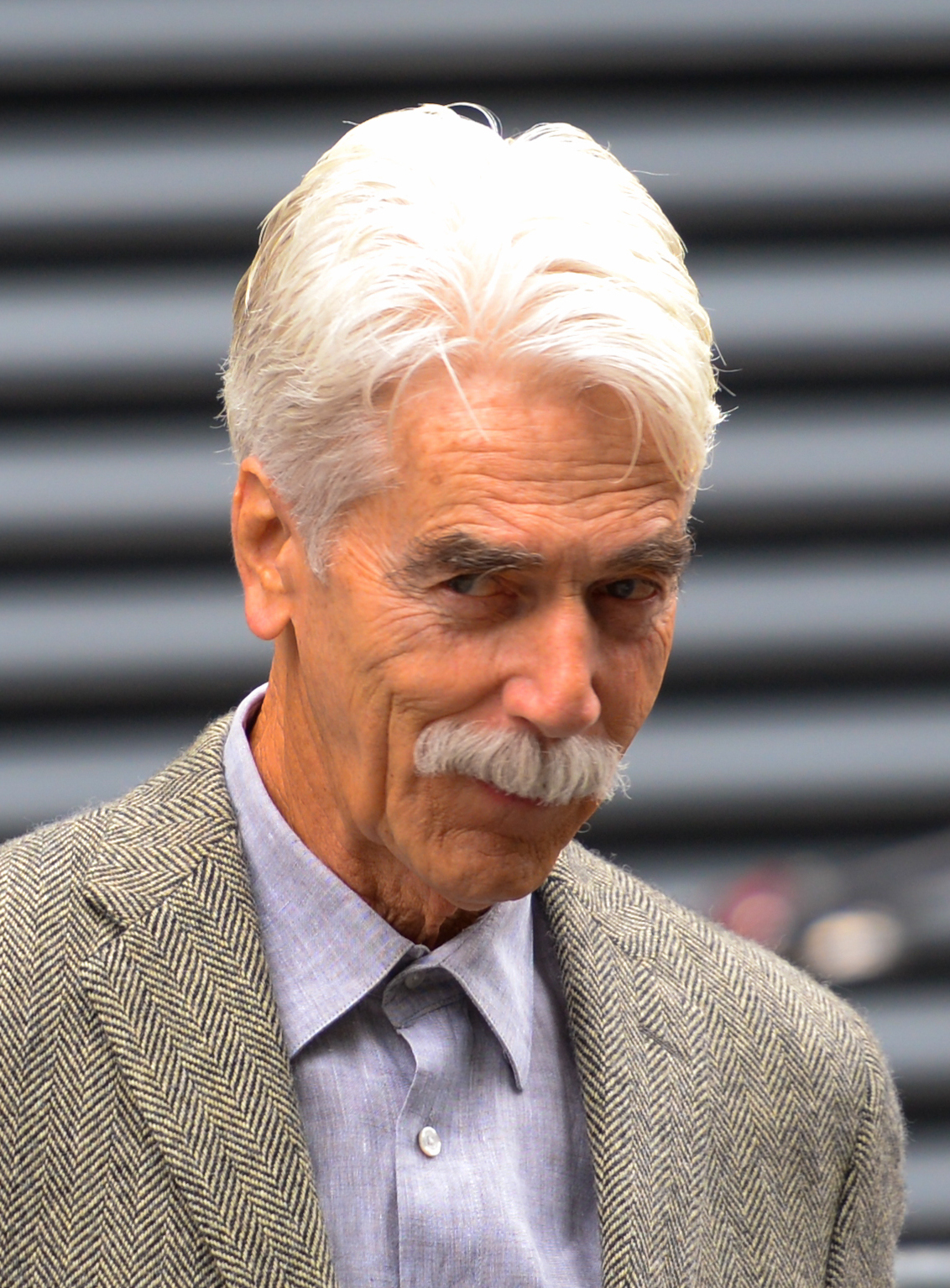
The performances of Bradley Cooper, Lady Gaga and Sam Elliott garnered widespread critical acclaim, earning them Academy Award nominations for Best Actor, Best Actress and Best Supporting Actor respectively.

Alonso Duralde of TheWrap praised Cooper and Gaga's chemistry, calling them "dynamite together", and described the musical numbers as "electrifying". Owen Gleiberman of Variety lauded Cooper's directing, co-writing and acting, and called the film "a transcendent Hollywood movie". In his review for the Los Angeles Times, Justin Chang called the film "remarkable" and praised Cooper's fresh take on the well-worn formula of the 1937 film, as well as his direction, the performances, writing and cinematography. Peter Travers of Rolling Stone deemed it a "modern classic", hailing the performances of Cooper and Gaga and Cooper's direction. He found the screenplay and original songs "seamless" and "terrific", and called the film one of the year's best. Ann Hornaday of The Washington Post described the film as "lavishly delightful" and "earthly convincing", and praised its depiction of the machinery of stardom. Writing for the Chicago Sun-Times, Richard Roeper described the film as "electric and shatteringly powerful", calling it the best version of A Star Is Born and one of the year's best films. David Rooney of The Hollywood Reporter noted that the film does not fully sustain the energy of its opening, but called it a "heartfelt and gutsy" retelling of a familiar story. Peter Howell of the Toronto Star praised Cooper and Gaga as "inspired collaborators", noting the "skill and passion" they brought to their respective directing and acting debuts, and credited their chemistry with making the familiar story feel "as fresh as a first kiss".

Gaga's performance received particular acclaim. Leah Greenblatt of Entertainment Weekly praised her "restrained, human-scale performance" and the vulnerability she brought to Ally. Joey Guerra of the Houston Chronicle praised Gaga's "natural and unforced" performance, writing that she brought "grace and light" to Ally and that the film's songs allowed her to "finally breathe as a singer". Sandra Hall of The Sydney Morning Herald described Gaga's performance as "disarmingly unaffected" and found her and Cooper convincing as a couple, while praising the concert scenes and Cooper's handling of Jackson's character. Matthew Norman of the London Evening Standard praised Gaga's "sublime naturalness" and the understated chemistry between the leads, while commending Cooper for recasting the familiar story as a "stridently modern parable about the corrosive power of fame". Donald Clarke of The Irish Times wrote that Gaga "exceeds all expectations" in the role and praised her ability to appear convincingly ordinary, describing her as "exotic when she's ordinary and rooted when she's fantastic". He also described Cooper as "in top gear" as an actor.

Several critics focused on the interplay between the two performances and Cooper's direction. David Sims of The Atlantic praised Gaga's understated performance in the film's first half and Cooper's increasingly "hauntingly raw" portrayal of Jackson, noting that the two actors effectively reverse performance styles as their characters' fortunes change. Stephanie Zacharek of Time praised Cooper's direction and writing, as well as the performances and chemistry of Cooper and Gaga, and described Gaga's performance as a "knockout". Keith Uhlich of Slant Magazine praised Cooper's handling of the familiar story and commended him for treating Gaga "as a person first and an icon second", which he felt allowed her performance to feel raw and surprising. Manohla Dargis of The New York Times called the film a "gorgeous heartbreaker" and praised Cooper's commitment to its "big emotions", as well as Gaga's naturalistic performance. She nevertheless felt that Cooper added "too much psychological filler" to Jackson's backstory and that the increased focus on his character "somewhat weighs down" the latter part of the film.

Other critics raised concerns about the film's emphasis on Jackson and its treatment of the central relationship. Michael Phillips of the Chicago Tribune praised Cooper's direction and the performances, but criticized the film for giving Jackson disproportionate screen time and audience sympathy while leaving Ally with too few opportunities to express her own perspective. In a later essay, Phillips argued that the film's music helped audiences overlook concerns about its treatment of Jackson's destructive behavior and Ally's role in the relationship. Richard Brody of The New Yorker found the film "engaging and affecting" and praised Cooper for persuasively depicting the "fear factor of stardom". He also commended Gaga's performance as "full of life", though he criticized Cooper's direction for giving her insufficient screen time to fully develop the character. Gary M. Kramer of Salon was more critical, describing the romance between Jack and Ally as "neither convincing nor compelling" and finding the editing and pacing of the film's second half "haphazard". Nigel Andrews of the Financial Times praised Gaga's charisma and singing, but found the film increasingly sentimental as Jackson's decline unfolds, criticizing its "self-pity for the privileged" and "ever soggier schmaltz".

Broader commentary examined the film's portrayals of fame, gender, addiction and artistic authenticity. Nate Jones of Vulture wrote that A Star Is Born presents pop stardom as an alluring but unhealthy distraction, while crediting Cooper with making the film's world of fame feel convincing. Hilary Hughes of Billboard argued that the film achieved authenticity by confronting what she called a "damaging constant in the music industry": the abusive power dynamics between male gatekeepers and female artists. She viewed Ally's struggle for artistic and personal agency as central to the story, and interpreted Jackson's behavior as an indictment of toxic masculinity and the damage it can inflict on less powerful partners. Clem Bastow of The Guardian similarly examined the film's ideas of authenticity, seeing its apparent contrast between "real" rock and "fake" pop as a critique of old-school rock masculinity. She wrote that Jackson's downfall revealed the "cost of the 'old ways'", while Ally's rise challenged the notion that artistic success required the same self-destructive sacrifices. Jennifer Michael Hecht of Vox praised the film's depiction of addiction and emotional pain, but criticized its suicide sequence as overly explicit. She argued that the ending risks reinforcing the myth of a "generous" suicide by framing Jackson's death as enabling Ally's final ascent, unlike the 1954 version, whose ending presents Esther's future after her husband's death more bleakly.

The supporting cast also received praise. Leah Greenblatt of Entertainment Weekly highlighted "great unexpected supporting turns" from Dave Chappelle and Andrew Dice Clay, finding their characters "realer and more textured" than some of the film's more plot-driven supporting roles. Joe Morgenstern of The Wall Street Journal likewise called the supporting cast "brilliant", singling out Sam Elliott, Chappelle, Clay, Anthony Ramos and Rafi Gavron. Mark Kermode of The Observer similarly praised "strong supporting turns" from Elliott, Clay, and Chappelle.

=== Top ten lists ===
A Star Is Born was listed on numerous critics' top ten lists for 2018, among them:

- 1st – Chris Wasser, Irish Independent
- 1st – Harry Fletcher, London Evening Standard
- 1st – Tom Gliatto, People
- 1st – Owen Gleiberman, Variety
- 2nd – Complex
- 2nd – Frank Scheck, The Hollywood Reporter
- 2nd – Peter Bradshaw, The Guardian
- 2nd – The New Zealand Herald
- 2nd – Peter Travers, Rolling Stone
- 2nd – Brian Truitt, USA Today
- 2nd – Peter Debruge, Variety
- 3rd – Christopher Orr, The Atlantic
- 3rd – Robbie Collin, The Telegraph
- 4th – David Sims, The Atlantic
- 4th – Uproxx
- 6th – Lindsey Bahr, Associated Press
- 6th – Richard Roeper, Chicago Sun-Times
- 6th – Pete Hammond, Deadline Hollywood
- 6th – Matthew Jacobs, HuffPost
- 6th – Olly Richards, NME
- 6th – Quinn Hough, RogerEbert.com
- 7th – The Independent
- 7th – Sam C. Mac, Slant Magazine
- 7th – Stephanie Zacharek, Time
- 8th – Empire
- 8th – Sheila O'Malley, RogerEbert.com
- 8th – Richard Lawson, Vanity Fair
- 9th – Noel Murray, The A.V. Club
- 9th – Mike Scott, The Times-Picayune
- 10th – Jon Frosch, The Hollywood Reporter
- 10th – Christy Lemire, RogerEbert.com
- 10th – Emily Yoshida, Vulture
- Top 10 (listed alphabetically, not ranked) – IGN
- Top 10 (listed alphabetically, not ranked) – Kenneth Turan, Los Angeles Times
- Top 10 (listed alphabetically, not ranked) – NPR
- Top 10 (listed alphabetically, not ranked) – Nell Minow, RogerEbert.com
- Top 10 (listed alphabetically, not ranked) – Dana Stevens, Slate
- Top 10 (listed alphabetically, not ranked) – Giles Hattersley, British Vogue
- Top 10 (listed alphabetically, not ranked) – Joe Morgenstern, The Wall Street Journal

=== Accolades ===
A Star Is Born received numerous awards and nominations for its direction, performances, screenplay, cinematography and music. It was named one of the ten best films of 2018 by both the American Film Institute and the National Board of Review. The National Board of Review also named Cooper Best Director, Gaga Best Actress and Elliott Best Supporting Actor.

The film received eight nominations at the 91st Academy Awards, including Best Picture, Best Actor for Cooper, Best Actress for Gaga, Best Supporting Actor for Elliott and Best Adapted Screenplay, and won Best Original Song for "Shallow". At the 72nd British Academy Film Awards, it received seven nominations and won Best Original Music. Cooper was nominated in five categories for producing, directing, writing, acting and composing, becoming the first person in BAFTA history to receive nominations across all five disciplines in the same year.

At the 76th Golden Globe Awards, the film received five nominations, including Best Motion Picture – Drama, Best Director for Cooper and acting nominations for Cooper and Gaga, and won Best Original Song for "Shallow". At the 24th Critics' Choice Awards, it received nine nominations; Gaga shared the Best Actress award with Glenn Close, while "Shallow" won Best Song.

The film's music also received recognition across two Grammy Awards ceremonies, earning seven nominations and four wins. "Shallow" won Best Pop Duo/Group Performance and Best Song Written for Visual Media, while the soundtrack later won Best Compilation Soundtrack for Visual Media and "I'll Never Love Again" won Best Song Written for Visual Media. Across its awards campaign, Gaga became the first woman to win an Academy Award, BAFTA Award, Golden Globe Award and Grammy Award in the same year for her contributions to a single film.

=== Legacy ===
In 2024, IndieWire ranked A Star Is Born 87th among the "100 Greatest Movie Musicals of All Time"; Kate Erbland commended Cooper's direction and Gaga's performance, and argued that the film's lasting strength lay in its songs and emotional intimacy, "finding music even in the silence". In 2025, Marie Claire listed it among the 50 best movie musicals of all time, while The Washington Post included it in its list of "The 25 Best Movie Musicals of the 21st Century"; Ty Burr praised Cooper for capturing the "tenderness that has always been this story's secret ingredient" in this iteration. It ranked 13th on Parade's 2026 list of the "70 Best Movie Musicals of All Time", tied with the 1954 version of A Star Is Born, with Samuel R. Murrian calling it a "grand entertainment" and "an emotional juggernaut for anyone who's been around mental illness and addiction struggles".

In 2024, Variety ranked it fifth among the "50 Greatest Romantic Movies of All Time"; Owen Gleiberman appreciated its "earthy" realism and wrote that few romantic films could match the emotional impact of Ally's first onstage performance of "Shallow". The same year, Empire included it at number 50 in its "60 Best Romantic Movies" list, with Ben Travis praising Cooper and Gaga's chemistry and writing that the story's sorrow made the romance "all the more affecting".

In 2021, The Guardian placed A Star Is Born on their list of "Remakes that Outshine the Originals". In 2025, GQ ranked it second among the "Best Movie Remakes That Beat the Originals"; Jack King praised Cooper's "electric" direction and Gaga's acting, adding, "It's triumphant. It's tragic. It's gorgeous." The same year, it was included in the San Francisco Chronicle article "6 movie remakes as good as — or better than — the original", in which Mick LaSalle described it as "way better than both previous versions".

Shortly after its release, Michelle Ruiz of Vogue compared the film's cultural impact to that of Titanic (1997), describing its release as a shared "pop cultural experience". She pointed to the film's sweeping romance, the popularity of songs such as "Shallow", its proliferation of memes, and audiences returning for repeat viewings as signs of the intensity of its reception.

In August 2021, it was reported that Barbra Streisand, who starred in the 1976 remake of A Star Is Born, said she had initially supported plans for a remake starring Will Smith and Beyoncé, believing it would have offered a different approach through a different style of music and casting. She later expressed surprise that the 2018 version with Cooper and Gaga was so similar to her own film, calling it the "wrong idea". Her remarks contrasted with comments she made in a 2018 interview with Extra, in which she said she "loved" the film and called Gaga "wonderful".

After Steven Spielberg moved on from directing Maestro (2023), Cooper asked to be considered as his replacement and showed him an early cut of A Star Is Born. According to producer Kristie Macosko Krieger, Spielberg decided about 20 minutes into the screening that Cooper should direct Maestro. In 2023, filmmaker Denis Villeneuve named A Star Is Born among his favorite films.

== In popular culture ==
The film's first trailer generated several internet memes before its release, especially from a scene in which Jackson tells Ally, "I just wanted to take another look at you", prompting her surprised reaction and smile. In September 2018, Ellen DeGeneres spoofed the film's trailer on The Ellen DeGeneres Show, presenting an edited version in which she took on Ally's role. The following month, Jason Sudeikis impersonated Jackson Maine on the show and reenacted the "take another look at you" exchange.

In February 2019, Saturday Night Live referenced "Shallow" during a Weekend Update segment in which Melissa Villaseñor impersonated Gaga while performing the song, with Kyle Mooney appearing as Cooper's character. That month, Alicia Keys and James Corden parodied "Shallow" as "A Grammy Host Is Born" on The Late Late Show, while Brie Larson and Samuel L. Jackson recreated Gaga and Cooper's Oscars performance of the song on The Jonathan Ross Show in March. Later that year, the Modern Family episode "Snapped" featured Mitchell Pritchett (Jesse Tyler Ferguson) singing "Shallow" with his smart refrigerator.

A widely parodied element of the film's awards-season promotion was Gaga's repeated comment that "There can be a hundred people in the room and 99 don't believe in you, but just one does, and it can change your life," which she used to describe Cooper's support for her. The line became a meme during the press tour and was referenced by Sandra Oh and Andy Samberg during their opening monologue at the 76th Golden Globes, where Gaga laughed and responded, "It's true!".

Several parodies also drew directly on the film's imagery and scenes. The "ALLY" billboard, featured both in the marketing campaign for A Star Is Born and in a scene set on Los Angeles' Sunset Boulevard, was spoofed by the American comedian Amy Schumer, who recreated the neon-colored design with her own likeness and the name "AMY" to promote her 2019 Netflix special Amy Schumer: Growing. The satirical biographical film Weird: The Al Yankovic Story (2022) parodied Cooper's Grammy Awards scene from A Star Is Born.

== See also ==
- List of directorial debuts
- List of films featuring the deaf and hard of hearing
