= Better (talk show) =

American television show

- Also known as: The Better Show
- Genre: Talk show
- Presented by: Kristina Behr; JD Roberto
- Country of origin: United States
- Original language: English
- No. of seasons: 7

Original release
- Network: Syndication
- Release: 2007 – May 2015

Better, also known as The Better Show, is a syndicated lifestyle and celebrity focused daytime talk show that aired in syndication from 2007 to 2015. It aired weekdays on 160 stations across the United States. The program was produced and distributed by Meredith Corporation. The Better Show got its name from and is based on Meredith's flagship publication, Better Homes and Gardens. The show also tapped its other magazines' experts in home, shelter and parenting.

This was not Better Homes and Gardens' first foray into television; in the 1990s, the magazine presented a similar syndicated weekly program, Better Your Home with Better Homes and Gardens. In addition, the Australian version of the magazine hosts their TV program as well.

The hour-long daytime strip show Better allows eight minutes of local content. While in Kansas City, the national version on KSMO-TV was also complemented by a total localized version, Better Kansas City, on KCTV. At least with Meredith stations those with some localized content gave a local version of the name. For example, WNEM-TV's version was called Better Mid-Michigan. while WGCL-TV's edition was known as Better Mornings Atlanta; and KPHO-TV's show was called Better Arizona. WPHL-TV (a Tribune-owned Better affiliate) aired the national version in the morning with local cut-ins throughout the hour, branded as Better Philly.

== History and affiliates ==
The Better Show began on KPTV in Portland, Oregon as a local show. Production of the program began in several test markets in 2007 and placed into syndication later that year.

By January 2008, the show was on 10 Meredith and 3 Journal stations. At that time, Meredith signed 12 additional stations to carry the show, 1 Fisher Communications, 7 LIN TV and 4 Northwest Broadcasting. Fisher launched in March 2008 while LIN and Northwest launched the fall.

In Kansas City in September 2012, a totally localized Better Kansas City debuted on KCTV, while the national Better program aired on sister station KSMO-TV. Meredith announced that The Better Show would premiere on The Hallmark Channel in October 2012 to replace programming from Martha Stewart and to complement its "Home & Family" programming block. The CW Plus picked up Better for air on its stations in fall 2014, where it replaced The Daily Buzz.

In February 2015, Meredith confirmed that the program would end in May 2015. Repeats continued to air until mid-September 2015. Despite the cancellation of the national program, KCTV's Better Kansas City continues to be produced in that market as of December 2018, along with WFSB's Better Connecticut for central Connecticut, which was later renamed to Great Day Connecticut.

== Hosts and correspondents ==
The Better Show was co-hosted by Kristina Behr and JD Roberto from studios in Midtown Manhattan when it was cancelled. The show's other primary personality was correspondent Sarah Bernard.

Initially, The Better Show was split-hosted by Emmy-nominated Audra Lowe in New York City and Kimberly Maus at KPTV in Portland, Oregon. In August 2009, the show's West Coast operations moved to WFSB in Rocky Hill, Connecticut, near Hartford. At that time Lowe became the program's solo host.

Rhiannon Ally was named Lowe's co-host in January 2011. She originally joined the program in September 2009 as a correspondent based out of Rocky Hill. She had also served as Lowe's substitute. Ally left to take a news anchor position in Miami, Florida.

On September 12, 2011, JD Roberto was added as a co-host. Reporter Leslie Nagy was the show's main correspondent. Home and design expert Jennifer Adams, gardening host Mar Jennings, and celebrity and country music interviewers Ashlie Kolb and Sarah Bernard made regular contributions to the program.

Lowe served as the show's longest running host. When she walked away from her contract in 2013, the show hired soap opera veteran Rebecca Budig to replace her on the desk with Roberto. Budig stayed one season. All three hosts were nominated for a National Daytime Emmy in the "Best Hosting" category.
