= John Fyfe (footballer) =

Scottish footballer

Personal information
- Full name: John Herbert Fyfe
- Date of birth: 18 March 1873
- Place of birth: Girvan, Scotland
- Date of death: 18 February 1950 (aged 76)
- Place of death: Wormley, England
- Position: Right winger

Senior career*
Years	Team	Apps	(Gls)
- Glasgow South-Western
1893–1894	St Mirren	13	(3)
1894–1896	Third Lanark	24	(10)

International career
1895	Scotland	1	(0)
- * Club domestic league appearances and goals

John Herbert Fyfe (18 March 1873 – 18 February 1950) was a Scottish footballer who played as a right winger.

== Career ==
Fyfe played club football for Glasgow South-Western, St Mirren and Third Lanark, and represented Scotland in 1895.

== Later and personal life ==
Fyfe later emigrated to India, but eventually relocated to southern England from where his wife originated. His son Ken represented Scotland at rugby in the 1930s.
