= Tim Monich =

American dialect coach (born 1950)

Tim Monich (born 1950) is an American speech and dialect coach who has worked on numerous stage and film productions. He is known for coaching such actors as Brad Pitt in Inglourious Basterds, Hilary Swank in Amelia, Cate Blanchett in Indiana Jones and the Kingdom of the Crystal Skull, and Matt Damon in Invictus, for which Damon received an Oscar nomination for Best Actor in a Supporting Role.

== Early life, family and education ==
Monich grew up in Corona, California. His father worked for a company that built freeways and his mother was a reporter for the Riverside Press-Enterprise. He attended the University of California at Riverside and then majored in directing as an undergraduate at Carnegie Mellon University. While there he studied speech and dialect with Edith Skinner and received a BFA and an MFA. Monich received a grant for graduate work with Skinner. He assisted her in revising her 1942 book Speak with Distinction. Following this, Monich became a faculty member of the Drama Division at Juilliard from 1975 to 1987; where he taught aspiring actors such as Kevin Spacey, Val Kilmer and Kelly McGillis. According to Alex Wilkinson of The New York Times, Monich is "pedagogically descended: from nineteenth-century philologist, Henry Sweet; who was the inspiration for Henry Higgins in Pygmalion. Sweet taught the Australian elocutionist Williams Tilly; who in turn taught Edith Skinner: Monich's teacher."

== Career ==
Monich has worked as a speech and dialect coach on hundreds of productions for film, television and theater. His first on-location film was coaching Arnold Schwarzenegger on the film Conan the Destroyer in 1984. "I was just helping him speak English," recalled Monich. Actor Donald Sutherland, who Monich coached to speak in various films as a South African, an Englishman, a wealthy New Yorker, a New Englander, a Kansan, a Georgian, an Oregonian, a North Carolinian, a Mississippian, a Michigander, a Minnesotan, and a member of the Polish politburo, once said of him:

He’s not a mechanic, and he doesn’t impose. He comes in from underneath and supports your instincts; he doesn’t try to define them. There are many people who do what he does, and by and large they offer constraints. He offers liberation.

Leonardo DiCaprio states that Monich "goes around the world collecting voices like they’re coins … They don’t buy the performance unless I spend time with Tim and get verified." Monich has over 6,000 personally recorded accent and dialect samples, assembled over 30 years, from around the world archived in his collection. He is known to record accents from television shows such as Book TV, Charlie Rose, and Meet the Press; which are "good for foreign accents, especially those of diplomats, lawyers, and politicians."

He worked with Carey Mulligan on Felicia Montealegre Bernstein's dialect for Maestro (2023).

== Personal life ==
Monich lives in Westport, Connecticut with his wife Linda Szmyd, a dance writer. They have two daughters.

== Credits ==
=== Film ===
Year	Title	Role	Ref
1989	Billy Bathgate	Dialect coach: Dustin Hoffman	
1990	Presumed Innocent	Dialect coach: Harrison Ford	
1989	The Russia House	Dialect coach: Michelle Pfeiffer	
1991	Thelma & Louise	Dialect coach: Brad Pitt	
1991	Billy Bathgate	Dialect coach	
1991	JFK	Dialect coach: Gary Oldman	
1992	Far and Away	Dialect coach	
1993	The Age of Innocence	Dialect coach	
1993	Schindler's List	Dialect coach	
1993	Six Degrees of Separation	Dialect coach	
1994	Interview with the Vampire	Dialect coach	
1994	Nell	Dialect coach	
1994	Little Women	Dialect coach	
1995	Dead Man Walking	Dialect coach	
1996	Mission Impossible	Dialect coach	
1996	A Time to Kill	Dialect coach	
1997	Contact	Dialect coach	
1997	Midnight in the Garden of Good and Evil	Dialect coach	
1999	Jakob the Liar	Dialect coach: Hungary	
1999	The Talented Mr. Ripley	Dialect coach: Matt Damon	
2000	The Adventures of Rocky and Bullwinkle	Dialect coach	
2000	X-Men	Dialect coach	
2000	Rugrats in Paris	Language advisor: Susan Sarandon	
2000	Finding Forrester	Dialect coach: Anna Paquin	
2002	Gangs of New York	Dialect coach	
2002	Catch Me If You Can	Dialect coach: Leonardo DiCaprio	
2003	Cold Mountain	Dialect coach: Jude Law / Nicole Kidman	
2004	The Aviator	Dialect coach: Cate Blanchett	
2006	The Pink Panther	Dialect coach: Kevin Kline	
2006	The Departed	Dialect coach	
2007	I'm Not There	Dialect coach: Cate Blanchett	
2008	Camille	Dialect coach: Sienna Miller	
2008	Indiana Jones and the Kingdom of the Crystal Skull	Dialect coach: Cate Blanchett	
2008	Traitor	Dialect coach: Guy Pearce	
2008	Body of Lies	Dialect coach: Leonardo DiCaprio	
2008	Doubt	Dialect coach	
2008	The Curious Case of Benjamin Button	Dialect coach	
2009	Inglorious Basterds	Dialect coach: Brad Pitt	
2009	Invictus	Dialect coach: Matt Damon	
2010	True Grit	Dialect coach: Matt Damon	
2012	Django Unchained	Dialect coach: Leonardo DiCaprio	
2012	The Great Gatsby	Dialect coach: Carey Mulligan	
2013	The Wolf of Wall Street	Dialect coach	
2013	Frank	Dialect coach: Michael Fassbender	
2014	Clouds of Sils Maria	Dialect coach: Juliette Binoche	
2014	American Sniper	Dialect coach	
2016	Zoolander 2	Dialect coach	
2017	Pirates of the Caribbean: Dead Men Tell No Tales	Dialect coach: Javier Bardem	
2018	A Star Is Born	Dialect coach: Bradley Cooper	
2018	The House with a Clock in Its Walls	Dialect coach: Cate Blanchett	
2019	Once Upon a Time in Hollywood	Dialect coach	
2019	The Irishman	Dialect coach: ADR	
2021	Ted K	Dialect coach: Sharlto Copley	
2021	Charlotte	Dialect coach: Sophie Okonedo	
2022	Death on the Nile	Dialect coach: Sophie Okonedo	
2022	Amsterdam	Dialect coach: Margot Robbie	
2023	Ferrari	Dialect coach: Adam Driver	
2023	Maestro	Dialect coach	
2025	Eleanor the Great	Dialect coach: Erin Kellyman	

=== Television ===
Year	Title	Role	Ref
2024–2025	The Agency: Central Intelligence	Dialect coach: Michael Fassbender	
2022	The Patient	Dialect coach: Domhnall Gleeson	
2022	The First Lady	Dialect coach	
2020	The Plot Against America	Dialect coach: John Turturro	
2020	Who Is America	Dialect coach	
2020	American Crime Story	Dialect coach: Penelope Cruz	
2017	The Wizard of Lies	Dialect coach	
2017	Manhunt	Dialect coach: Paul Bettany	
2017	Feud	Dialect coach	
2016	The Young Pope	Dialect coach: Jude Law	
2014	The Knick	Dialect coach: Clive Owen	
2012	Hemingway & Gellhorn	Dialect coach: Nicole Kidman	
2008	My Zinc Bed	Dialect coach	
2002	Path to War	Dialect coach: Donald Sutherland	
2002	Hysterical Blindness	Dialect coach	
1998	Winchell	Dialect coach	
1995	Kissinger and Nixon	Dialect coach	
1994	Oldest Living Confederate Widow Tells All	Dialect coach	
1993	Zelda	Dialect coach	
1983	Kennedy	Dialect coach	

=== Theater ===
Year	Title	Role	Ref
2002	Impressionism	Dialect coach	
1998	The Deep Blue Sea	Dialect coach	
1998	Cabaret	Dialect coach	
1993	Candida	Dialect coach	
1989	Orpheus Descending	Vocal coach	
1988	A Walk in the Woods	Dialect Consultant	
1986	Loot	Dialect Coach	
1985	Big River	Dialect Coach	
1985	The Octette Bridge Club	Dialect Coach	
1983	Show Boat	Dialogue Coach	
1983	A View From the Bridge	Dialect Consultant	
1980	Amadeus	Speech Consultant	
1980	Betrayal	Speech Coach	
