= Mar Jennings =

American television host

Mar Jennings

Mar Jennings, is an American television host, actor and author. He is the host of Life On Mar's: The Home Makeover Show, served as a lifestyle correspondent for the Better Show.

He has appeared on The Today Show, HGTV, and other television networks.

== Career ==
Jennings is the creator and host of Life On Mar's: The Home Makeover Show, an interior design and home improvement television show. The show is now in its sixth season and currently airs on Amazon Prime, Tubi and Roku. It has been broadcast on ABC, and was recently syndicated on Cox, Comcast and various other American television networks, and has aired monthly on the Connecticut TV station WTNH. He was also the host of FOX 61/CT1 Media, Northeast Living, which was nominated for a regional Emmy award.

He founded S&J Multimedia and Mar Jennings Real Estate. Jennings has also worked at Christie's International Real Estate and Douglas Elliman Real Estate.

In 2014, Jennings became President & Sale Director at the real estate firm Mar Jennings Team at Higgins Group, an affiliate of Forbes Global Properties.

== Books ==
- Jennings, Mar (2013). Life on Mar's: Creating Casual Luxury. S&J Publishing. ISBN 9780578120829. (A book that discusses six design principles for Jennings' Casual Luxury home design style.)
- Jennings, Mar (2007). Life on Mar's, A Four Season Garden. S&J Publishing. ISBN 9781604611953.
