= Jeremy Turner =

Jeremy Turner may refer to:

- Jeremy Turner (composer), American composer
- Jeremy Turner (guitarist), guitarist for the American band Origin
