= Gerry Turner =

American photographer, science fiction and fantasy writer (1921–1982)

- Born: 1921; Westport, Connecticut, US
- Died: 1982 (aged 60–61); Westport, Connecticut, US
- Occupations: Novelist; photographer
- Writing career
- Period: 1959–1980
- Genres: Science fiction, fantasy, nonfiction

Gerry Alain Turner (1921–1982) was an American photographer and children's fiction author. He worked under the name Gerry Turner.

== Life ==
Turner was born in 1921 in Westport, Connecticut, and died in 1982 in Westport, Connecticut.

== Photography ==
Turner was a well-regarded photographer, specializing in children's portraiture and travel photography. As a portrait photographer he worked with more than one thousand families in Fairfield County, Connecticut, all including natural backgrounds. A series of portraits commissioned by the Girl Scouts of the USA for presentation to the White House were included in a permanent collection there.

His works were featured on leading magazine covers and national advertisements.

The Irish Tourist Board (Fáilte Ireland) commissioned him to visit Ireland and photograph the country and its people; he returned to the country for several weeks each year on assignment for the Irish government shooting photographs for use by the both Tourist Board and Aer Lingus, Irish International Airlines.

His photography was included in the fine arts collections of various museums, and displayed in a number of one-man shows, including one in September 1977 at the Wilton, Connecticut center office of A.G. Edwards and Sons, Inc., members of the New York Stock Exchange.

== Writing ==
Turner wrote seven books, ranging "from science-fiction and fantasy to books of adventure for young readers and practical works in photography and fine arts." Among them were one fairy tale, Magic Night for Lillibet, one science fiction novel, Stranger from the Depths, and two works of non-fiction, Creative Crafts for Everyone and The Teen Model Fact Book. His publishers included Doubleday, Viking Press, Bobbs-Merrill, Concordia Press and American Greetings.

== Bibliography ==
=== Fiction ===
- Magic Night for Lillibet (Bobbs-Merrill Co., 1959)
- Stormy and the Tree-House Gang (Concordia Pub. House, 1966) = Stormy und die Baumhausbande (German, R. Brockhaus, 1971, 2nd ed., 1978)
- Stranger from the Depths (Doubleday, 1967) (Scholastic (abridged), 1970)
- Hide-out for a Horse (Macdonald & Co., 1968) = Der verstecke Schimmel (German, Oncken-Verl, 1968)
- The Silver Dollar Hoard of Aristotle Gaskin (Doubleday, 1968)

=== Non-fiction ===
- Creative Crafts for Everyone (Viking Press, 1959)
- The Teen Model Fact Book (J. Messner, 1980)
