= John William Fyfe =

American teaching physician

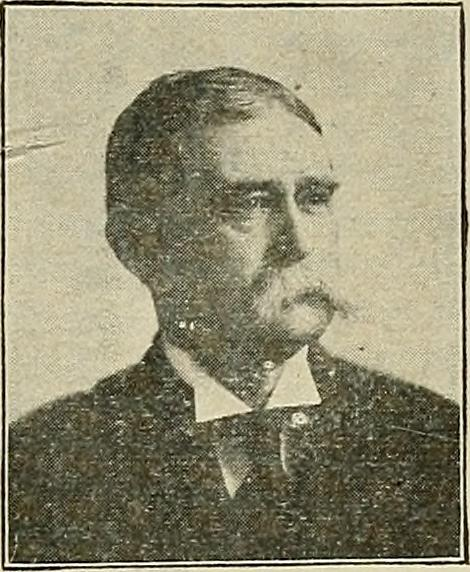
John William Fyfe (1909)

John William Fyfe (born February 27, 1839, date of death unknown) was an American teaching physician in New York in the late nineteenth and early twentieth centuries.

Fyfe was a physician of the eclectic school and author of herbal manuals for physicians. His works include The Essentials of Modern Materia Medica and Therapeutics, also known as Fyfe's Materia Medica (1903); Pocket Essentials of Modern Materia Medica and Therapeutics (1911); and Specific Diagnosis and Specific Medication (1909).

On February 27, 1839, Fyfe was born in Swan's Island, Maine, a very small island town off the coast of the mainland of Hancock County. Fyfe grew up and lived in Saugatuck, Connecticut—a small neighborhood within the town of Westport—for most of his life. He was the president of the Connecticut Eclectic State Medical Examination Board and an author of multiple works, including a family genealogy.
