= List of people from Brookfield, Connecticut =

This list of people from Brookfield, Connecticut includes current and past residents as well as others associated with Brookfield, Connecticut. The list is categorized by the area in which each person is best known, in alphabetical order within each category:

== Actors, musicians, and others in entertainment ==
- Carlyle Blackwell, silent film actor, director and producer
- Frederick Bristol, voice teacher and singer
- Julia DeMato, contestant on American Idol
- Will Denton, actor on the NBC series Kidnapped
- Frank Enea, musician and composer
- C. B. Hawley, bass, voice teacher, organist and composer
- Art Ryerson, jazz guitarist and early rock and roll pioneer
- Brian Slawson, Grammy-nominated composer
- Ronnie Spector, rock and roll singer
- Kari Wuhrer (born 1967), actress and singer

== Authors, writers, journalists, photojournalists ==
- Virgil Geddes, playwright, political activist, and founder of the Brookfield Players
- Joseph Hayes, novelist and playwright, author of The Desperate Hours
- Gabriel Heatter, radio news commentator and journalist
- Lucia Ruggles Holman (1793-1886), teacher, letter writer, missionary
- Antoinette Bosco, best selling author, Syndicated Columnist for The Catholic News Service, Award-Winning Journalist, Founding Editor The Litchfield County Times (9/18/1928 - 3/20/2020)

== Government, military ==
- Martin Foncello, representative for Connecticut's 107th General Assembly District
- Stephen Harding, attorney and senator for Connecticut's 5th State Senate district
- Darren LaBonte, CIA officer killed in Camp Chapman attack in 2009
- Samuel E. Merwin, 44th governor of Connecticut (1889–1893)
- Lou Rell, First Gentleman of Connecticut (married to M. Jodi Rell); aviator
- M. Jodi Rell, 87th governor of Connecticut (in office 2004–2011, resident 1969–2016)

== Business ==
- Anna Mangin, inventor and women's rights campaigner
- Shelly Palmer, advertising, marketing and technology consultant, and business adviser
- Michael Walrath, venture capitalist, founder and CEO of Right Media
- Scott Werndorfer, co-founder and developer of Cerulean Studios

== Sports ==
- Scott Lutrus, football player in the NFL
- Gene Sarazen, golfer; won the United States Open, British Open, PGA Championship, and the Masters; built Sunset Hill Golf Course in Brookfield

== Artists ==
- Lester Beall, modern graphic design pioneer
- Bob Camp, cartoonist, comic book artist, director, and producer
- Elizabeth Peyton, painter who rose to popularity in the mid-1990s
- Bill Westenhofer, visual effects artist and winner of two Academy Awards

== Others ==
- Joseph Collins, neurologist and co-founder of the Neurological Institute of New York
- Clinton Jones (1916–2006), American Episcopal priest and gay rights activist

== See also ==
- List of people from Connecticut
- List of people from Bridgeport, Connecticut
- List of people from Darien, Connecticut
- List of people from Greenwich, Connecticut
- List of people from Hartford, Connecticut
- List of people from New Canaan, Connecticut
- List of people from New Haven, Connecticut
- List of people from Norwalk, Connecticut
- List of people from Redding, Connecticut
- List of people from Ridgefield, Connecticut
- List of people from Stamford, Connecticut
- List of people from Westport, Connecticut
