= Thomas Jefferson High School for Science and Technology =

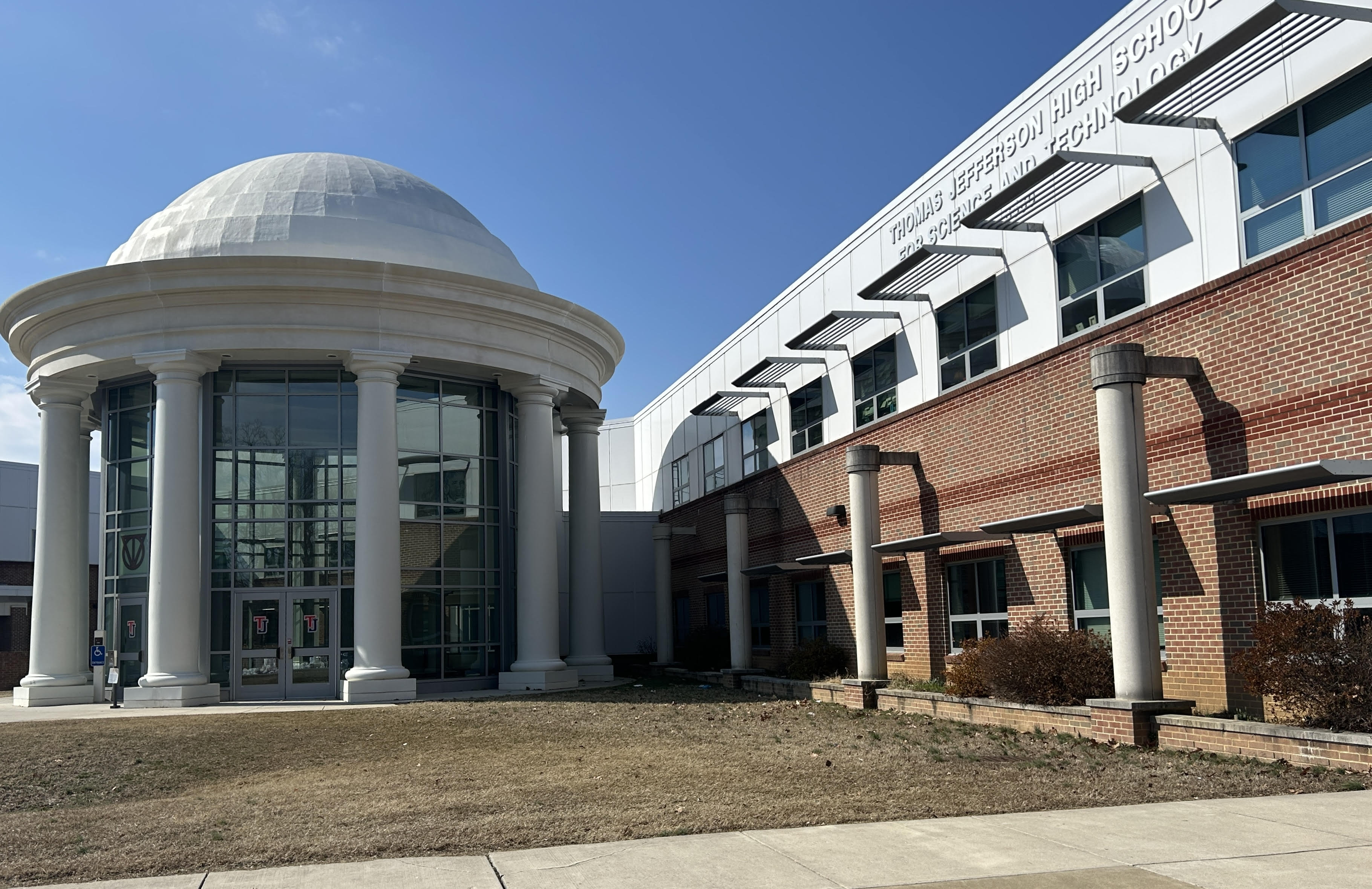

Location
- 6560 Braddock Road; Alexandria, Virginia 22312; United States; 38°49′06″N 77°10′07″W

Information
- School type: Public, magnet high school
- Founded: 1985; 41 years ago
- School district: Fairfax County Public Schools
- Principal: Michael Mukai
- Teaching staff: 120.23 (FTE) (2023–24)
- Grades: 9–12
- Gender: Coeducational
- Enrollment: 2,133 (2024–25)
- Student to teacher ratio: 16.78 (2023–24)
- Campus type: Suburban
- Colors: Red, white, and navy
- Athletics conference: National District; Region 6C
- Team name: Colonials
- Accreditation: SACS CASI
- USNWR ranking: 5 (2025)
- Newspaper: tjTODAY
- Yearbook: Techniques
- Communities served: Northern Virginia
- Feeder schools: Northern Virginia schools
- Website: tjhsst.fcps.edu

Thomas Jefferson High School for Science and Technology (also known as TJHSST, Thomas Jefferson, or TJ) is a magnet high school in Fairfax County, Virginia, United States, operated by Fairfax County Public Schools. The school occupies the building of the previous Thomas Jefferson High School, constructed in 1964. A selective admissions program was initiated in 1985 through the cooperation of state and county governments and corporate sponsorship from the defense and technology industries. It is one of 18 Virginia Governor's Schools, and a founding member of the National Consortium for Specialized Secondary Schools of Mathematics, Science and Technology.

Attendance at the school is open to students in six local jurisdictions based on academic achievement described in the Student Portrait Sheet—a compilation of 4 essays, problem-solving skills—assessed by the Problem Solving Essay, an unweighted grade-point average consisting of 7th grade final grades—8th grade first quarter grades—and summer grades, and socio-economic background. Before the 2020–21 school year, the admissions process also involved a mathematics, reading, and science exam.

== Administration ==
The current principal of Thomas Jefferson High School for Science and Technology is Michael Mukai.

== History ==
=== 20th century ===
Thomas Jefferson High School was constructed and opened in 1964. Fairfax County Public Schools' superintendent William J. Burkholder and his staff began working on the idea of a science high school in 1983 with advice from the superintendent's business/advisory council. Burkholder announced the plans for the magnet school in January 1984. The school board chose Thomas Jefferson High School as the location for the new magnet school in June 1984 and approved the funding in February 1985.

The school was originally intended to only serve Fairfax County students, but after Virginia governor Charles S. Robb chose Fairfax County as the location of a regional science and technology school, the school board voted to accept the funding from the state and allow students from Arlington, Loudoun, and Prince William counties and from the Cities of Fairfax and Falls Church to attend as well. The business community played a significant role in the creation of the school, providing around $3 million in contributions and advice on the school's curriculum. Hazleton Laboratories (now Fortrea), Honeywell, AT&T, Dominion Energy, Sony Corporation, Hewlett-Packard, Xerox, and other companies made contributions in equipment or finances to the school before it opened. Thomas Jefferson High School for Science and Technology opened in fall 1985 with 400 ninth-graders and 125 seniors who were selected from 1,200 applicants.

=== 21st century ===
From 2013 to 2017, the school underwent renovations, adding additional research labs, internet cafes, three-dimensional art galleries, a black box theater, and a dome reminiscent of President Thomas Jefferson's Monticello. The renovations cost $90 million.

== Admissions ==
Admission statistics
Year	Applicants	Admits	Admit rate
2012	3,423	480	14.0%
2013	3,121	480	15.4%
2014	2,900	487	16.8%
2015	2,841	493	17.4%
2016	2,868	483	16.8%
2017	2,902	490	16.9%
2018	3,160	485	15.3%
2019	2,766	494	17.9%
2020	2,539	486	19.1%
2021	3,034	550	18.1%
2022	2,544	550	21.6%
2023	2,548	550	21.6%
2024	2,627	550	20.9%
2025	2,605	550	21.1%
2026	2,762	550	19.9%

The school is part of the Fairfax County Public Schools system of Fairfax County, Virginia. Students from Fairfax, Arlington, Loudoun, and Prince William counties and from the Cities of Fairfax and Falls Church are eligible for admission. Students must be enrolled in Algebra 1 or a higher level mathematics class in 8th grade and have a minimum GPA of 3.5 to be eligible.

The admissions process is based on grade point average, a mathematics or science related problem solving essay, a student portrait sheet demonstrating skills and character, and details about a student's socioeconomic background including whether they are economically disadvantaged, a special education student, or an English language learner. Each public school is allocated a number of seats equal to 1.5% of that school's 8th grade student population; the remaining seats are not allocated and offered to the highest evaluated remaining students. During the admissions process, students are identified only by a number; admissions officers do not know their race, ethnicity, sex, or name.

Before the 2020–21 school year, the admissions process also included a mathematics, reading, and science exam.

== Controversies ==
In the 2020s, Thomas Jefferson High School for Science and Technology (TJHSST) underwent three major controversies regarding its admissions process, intentionally delayed distribution of National Merit awards, and its relationship with Chinese Communist Party-affiliated entities. Amidst these controversies, Principal Ann Bonitatibus resigned in October 2024; she stated in an email to parents that she had "pursued and accepted" a "promotion" to the Fairfax County Public Schools' Human Resources department, which drew widespread skepticism. She was replaced by Michael Mukai, a TJHSST alumnus, on January 9, 2025.

=== Demographics and exam controversy ===
Racial demographics, 2025-2026 academic year
Race and ethnicity	Total
Asian	63.44%
White	19.85%
Two or more Races	5.79%
Hispanic	5.89%
Black	4.89%
Native Hawaiian/Pacific Islander	0.09%
American Indian/Alaska Native	0.05%
Sex	Total
Male	54%
Female	46%

The admissions process and the demographics of the student body it produces, in particular the relative under-representation of black and Hispanic students, as well as attempts to diversify the student body, have been a source of controversy throughout the school's recent history.

==== Affirmative action program ====
After the school's early graduating classes included relatively few black and Hispanic students, FCPS created a race-based affirmative action program to admit more black and Hispanic students. The program was in effect for the admissions process for the graduating classes of 1997 through 2002; the county ended it because of legal challenges to similar programs. Following the end of this program, the share of black and Hispanic students at the school decreased from 9.4 percent in 1997–98 to 3.5 percent in 2003–04. Black and Hispanic students remained significantly under-represented at the school through the 2000s and 2010s.

==== Department of Education complaint ====
In 2012, a civil rights complaint against the school was filed with the U.S. Department of Education Office of Civil Rights by Coalition of the Silence, an advocacy group led by former county School Board member Tina Hone, and the Fairfax chapter of the NAACP, alleging that it discriminated against black, Hispanic, and disabled students. In response, the Office of Civil Rights, in September 2012, opened an investigation.

==== 2020 Admissions policy changes ====
In 2020, the school board made a number of significant changes to the admissions process meant to increase the ratio of black and Hispanic students admitted. These included the elimination of the $100 application fee; the increase of the number of admitted students from around 480 to 550; the elimination of an entrance exam; the allocation of seats to each middle school equal to 1.5% of their 8th grade student population; and the addition of "experience factors" including whether students are economically disadvantaged, English language learners, or special education students. Following these changes, the proportion of black and Hispanic students admitted increased from 4.52% to 18.36% while the proportion of Asian Americans decreased from 73.05% to 54.36%. The proportion of female students admitted also increased, from 41.80% to 46.00%, and to 55.45% the next year.

Racial Composition of TJHSST Admissions, 2016-2026.

==== Coalition for TJ v. Fairfax County School Board ====
In March 2021, the Coalition for TJ, an advocacy group opposed to the changes and represented by the Pacific Legal Foundation, sued the Fairfax County school board, alleging that the changes to the admissions process discriminated against Asian Americans.

In February 2022, judge Claude M. Hilton of the United States District Court for the Eastern District of Virginia ruled in Coalition for TJ v. Fairfax County School Board in the Coalition for TJ's favor and ordered the school to return to the previous admissions process. The school board appealed the decision to the United States Court of Appeals for the Fourth Circuit and in March 2022 that court issued a stay on the order that allowed the school to continue the new admissions process while the case was pending. The Supreme Court of the United States rejected a request to vacate the stay in April 2022. The case was heard in the court of appeals on September 16, 2022, and decided on May 23, 2023. The Fourth Circuit, by a 2 to 1 vote, reversed the district court and restored the new admission plan. The Fourth Circuit's decision was appealed to the Supreme Court, but the Supreme Court rejected to review the case on February 20, 2024 with Justice Clarence Thomas and Justice Samuel Alito dissenting from the denial.

Asian admissions at TJHSST, % change from previous year.

==== Virginia Attorney General investigation ====
An investigation from the office of then-Virginia Attorney General, Jason Miyares, found that the school had violated the rights of, and discriminated against Asian American students. It published internal messages from the Fairfax County School Board such as:

- “there has been an anti asian feel underlying some of this, hate to say it lol,”
- "Asians hate us."
- that Asian students were “discriminated against in this process,”

The ultimate determination was that "[t]he revised admissions policy was a deliberate, race-based system designed to help some and disadvantage others. The otherwise qualified students not admitted to TJ lost out because they were Asian American...the Office of the Attorney General’s Office of Civil Rights has found reasonable cause to believe that FCPS discriminated against Asian American students on the basis of race in violation of the Virginia Human Rights Act and Title VI of the Civil Rights Act of 1964."

=== Merit award controversy ===
In December 2022, it was reported that during the previous five years, some students at the school who had been named National Merit Scholarship Commended Scholars had not been notified of their achievement until several months after the school was given the awards to distribute to the students. This meant that it was too late for the students to include the award with their college applications. A lawyer named Shawnna Yashar, whose son was one of the students at the school whose commendation information had not been reported by the school, said, "Keeping these certificates from students is theft by the state." School officials stated that the issue was a "one-time human error." It prompted then-Governor Glenn Youngkin to propose legislation mandating immediate notification of such opportunities to parents and students.

=== Relationship with the Chinese government ===
In March 2023, the conservative group Parents Defending Education published the findings of an investigation showing that a non-profit that fundraises for TJ had received over $1 million in donations since 2014 from sources affiliated with the Chinese government. Further investigation revealed that over $3.6 million had been donated. In return, TJ staff handed over significant amounts of intellectual property, including blueprints floor plans of the school, curricula, lab photographs, and thumb drives with Senior Student Research projects. According to The National Review, "Senior research projects are a TJ student’s crowning achievement...Sometimes, the projects are done in conjunction with defense contractors or 'mentors' in the [D.C.-Maryland-Virginia] area...TJ says on its website that students have partnered with George Washington University, the National Institutes of Health, and K2M. Chinese officials requested, and gained access to, examples of past student research projects, without student consent. In 2017, one administrator asked TJ to 'put [senior research projects] on a thumb drive,' as 'Dropbox is not accessible in China.'" At least twenty "Thomas schools", replicas of TJ, have been opened in China.

== Curriculum ==
TJ's curriculum is focused on college preparation, with an emphasis on science and technology.

All 9th graders participate in IBET, a program that integrates biology, English, and technology. It is designed to introduce students to the academic rigor of TJ while fostering connection.The program was formerly named IBEST, and included statistics, until its recent removal.

Additionally, all seniors are required to participate in TJ's senior research program. Students typically work in one of nine specialized labs: Astronomy, Biotechnology, Chemical Analysis, Computer Systems, Engineering, Mobile & Web Application Development, Neuroscience, Oceanography, and Quantum Physics & Optics. A mentorship program is also available, where students can work with industry professionals to conduct research outside of the typical school environment. This program culminates in tjSTAR, a symposium where students present their final research.

=== TJ3Sat and TJREVERB projects ===
The Systems Engineering Course designed and built a CubeSat which was launched on November 19, 2013, from Wallops Flight Facility in Virginia. Orbital Sciences Corporation donated the CubeSat Kit to the school on December 6, 2006, and provided the launch for the satellite. After a successful launch at 8:15PM EST, TJ^{3}SAT became the first satellite launched into space that was built by high school students. The launched satellite contained a 4-watt transmitter operating on amateur radio frequencies, and a text-to-speech module to allow it to broadcast ASCII-encoded messages sent to it from Jefferson.

TJREVERB, a 2U CubeSat, is the school's second CubeSat mission. After a 6-year period of planning, building, and testing from 2016 to 2022 that was interrupted by the COVID-19 pandemic, REVERB was launched aboard SpaceX's CRS-26 on November 26, 2022, at 2:20PM EST. REVERB was deployed from the International Space Station on December 29, 2022, via Nanoracks. The satellite is being located through crowdsourcing, with help from AMSAT. It will test the Iridium satellite radio and connect to the students' ground station through email.

=== Computer Systems Lab ===
The school's computer systems lab is one of the few high school computing facilities with a supercomputer. In 1988, a team from the school won an ETA-10P supercomputer in the SuperQuest competition, a national science competition for high school students. The ETA-10P was damaged by a roof leak in the 1990s. Cray Inc. donated a new SV1 supercomputer, known as Seymour, to the school on December 4, 2002, which is on display as of 2024.

The lab also supported a number of Sun Microsystems thin clients for use by students enrolled in AP Computer Science. In 2008, the school received a grant from Sun Microsystems for $388,048, which was student-written. The Syslab was given 7 Sun workstations, 12 Sun servers, and 145 Sun Rays for distribution throughout the school. These were placed in the existing AP Computer Science Lab and the science classrooms, support backend services, and serve as kiosks placed around the school for guests, students, and faculty. However, the Sun Rays were taken out of the AP Computer Science Lab due to teachers' objections. By 2014, the Sun Ray clients were decommissioned, and replaced with Linux-based thin clients running LTSP.

== Awards and recognition ==
In 2021 and 2022, the U.S. News & World Report ranked TJ as the best overall high school in the United States. It was previously ranked fourth in 2020, tenth in 2019, and sixth in 2018. In 2016, the school placed first in Newsweek's annual "America's Top High Schools" rankings for the third consecutive year. The average SAT score for the graduating class of 2020 was 1528 and the average ACT score was 34.5.

The school had 14 Intel Science Talent Search Semifinalists in 2007, 15 in 2009, and 13 in 2010. In 2024, 7 were named.

In 2007, for schools with more than 800 students in grades 10–12, TJ was cited as having the highest-performing Calculus BC, AP Chemistry, AP French Language, AP U.S. Government and Politics, and AP U.S. History courses among all schools worldwide. In 2014, 3864 AP Exams were taken by students; over 97% earned a score of 3, 4, or 5.

President Barack Obama signed the America Invents Act into law on September 16, 2011, at the school. The law was made to reform U.S. patent laws.

In 1997, 2000, 2013, 2017, and 2025, the wind ensemble of the school was among fifteen high-school bands invited to the Music for All National Concert Band Festival in Indianapolis.

== Notable alumni ==
- Robert W. Heath Jr., Professor at UC San Diego, signal processing and wireless communications innovator, researcher, and inventor, and member of the National Academy of Engineering
- Yohannes Abraham, government official
- Chris Avellone, game designer
- Praveen Balakrishnan, Chess Grandmaster
- Sandra Beasley, poet
- Bob Bland, fashion designer and activist
- Ian Caldwell, author
- Hung Cao, Republican candidate in the 2024 United States Senate election in Virginia and United States Under Secretary of the Navy.
- Mark Changizi, theoretical cognitive scientist
- Mike Elias, baseball executive
- Mark Embree, mathematician and Rhodes Scholar
- Eric Froehlich, professional poker and Magic: The Gathering player
- Sara Goldrick-Rab, sociologist
- Stephanie Hannon, CTO of Hillary Clinton 2016 presidential campaign
- Darius Kazemi, programmer, artist, and co-founder of Feel Train
- Sophia Kianni, climate activist
- Brandon Kim, short-track speed skater
- Andrew Kirmse, game developer and computer programmer
- Ehren Kruger, screenwriter
- Christo Landry, professional long-distance runner
- Howard Lerman, entrepreneur, co-founder of Yext
- Jose Llana, actor
- Geoffrey von Maltzahn, biological engineer, founder of Indigo Agriculture
- Mehret Mandefro, film/television producer, writer, physician, anthropologist
- Ashley Miller, screenwriter
- Kathryn Minshew, CEO and co-founder of The Muse
- Anthony Myint, restaurateur
- Aparna Nancherla, comedian
- Amna Nawaz, broadcast journalist
- Thao Nguyen, singer-songwriter
- Michael Hun Park, United States circuit judge of the United States Court of Appeals for the Second Circuit
- Emma Pierson, computer scientist and Rhodes Scholar
- Conor Russomanno, creator of OpenBCI
- Robert Sarvis, lawyer
- Monika Schleier-Smith, experimental physicist and MacArthur Fellow (2020)
- Andrew Seliskar, swimmer
- Meagan Spooner, author
- Chris Sununu, former Governor of New Hampshire
- William Tarpeh, chemical engineer and MacArthur Fellow
- Vlad Tenev, co-founder of companies in different sectors
- Owen Thomas, journalist
- Dustin Thomason, author
- Anne Toth, Head of Data Policy at the World Economic Forum
- Greg Tseng, entrepreneur, co-founder and CEO of Tagged
- Helen Wan, novelist and lawyer
- Staci Wilson, soccer player, Olympian

== See also ==
- Bronx High School of Science
- Coalition for TJ v. Fairfax County School Board
- Illinois Mathematics and Science Academy
- Lowell High School (San Francisco)
- Stuyvesant High School
