= Brookfield High School (Connecticut) =

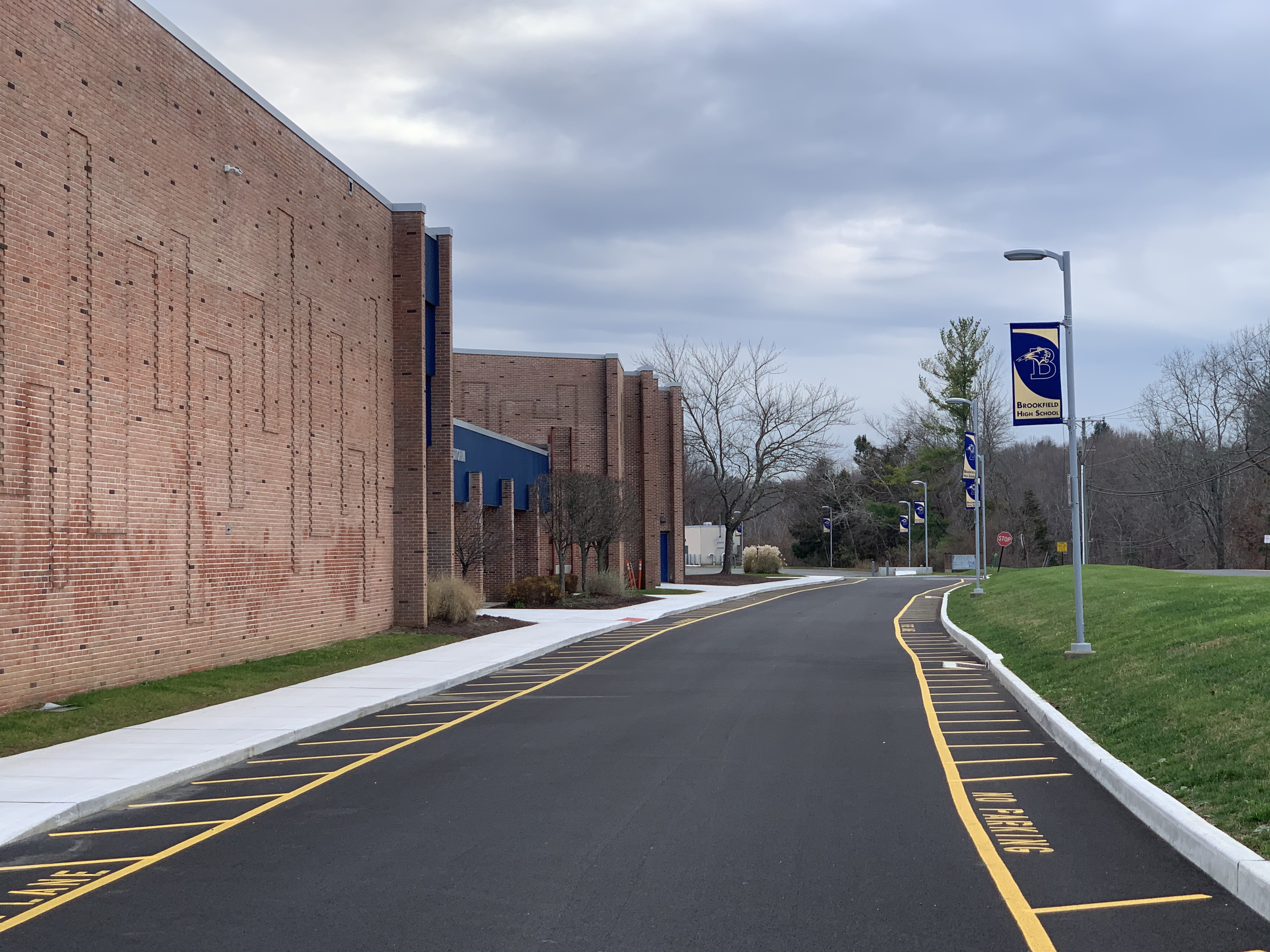
- Front of building, west entrance

Location
- 45 Longmeadow Hill Road; Brookfield, Connecticut 06804; United States; 41°28′51″N 73°23′26″W

Information
- Type: Public high school
- Motto: Respect, Responsibility, Rigor
- Established: 1962 (64 years ago)
- School district: Brookfield Public Schools
- CEEB code: 070085
- NCES School ID: 090054000109
- Principal: Marc Balanda
- Teaching staff: 67.00 (FTE)
- Grades: 9–12
- Enrollment: 871 (2023–2024)
- Student to teacher ratio: 13.00
- Campus type: Suburban
- Colors: Blue and gold
- Mascot: Bobcat
- Accreditation: New England Association of Schools and Colleges
- Newspaper: Paw Print
- Website: bhs.brookfieldps.org

Brookfield High School is a public high school serving the town of Brookfield, Fairfield County, Connecticut, United States. The school offers a wide variety of co-curricular and extra-curricular activities, and is frequently ranked by U.S. News & World Report as one of the top high schools in Connecticut and the United States. Brookfield is one of the twenty-one school districts in District Reference Group B.

In the 2021–2022 school year the school had 902 students. The ethnic makeup of the student body is approximately 76.2% Caucasian, 2.4% Black, 8.5% Asian, and 12.1% Hispanic.

== History ==
The school was originally built in 1962 as Long Meadow Hill Junior High School. Less than 10 years later, it was converted to a high school and graduated its first class in 1967. It has had a number of additions. In 1967, a 3-floor section was added. In 1974, a new auditorium and a second gym were added. Another wing was later added (unsure of when). The most recent expansion was in 2007. It included a new video production studio and two new wings, the library was made bigger, and the existing classrooms were updated (completed in early 2008). The football field and track was redone shortly thereafter. In August 2009, the student parking lot was repaved. In 2016, the new basketball gym was repainted and waxed. Later, in 2017, the roof was completely reconstructed.

== Sports ==
The school mascot is the Bobcat and the school colors are blue and gold. Both white and black have also been used for team uniforms.

Brookfield High School is a member of the South West Conference. Commonly referred to as the SWC, Brookfield competes with 12 other local schools.

== Notable alumni ==
- Julia DeMato (class of 1997), professional cosmetologist and singer.
- Will Denton (Class of 2008), actor.
- Andrew Hales (Class of 2008), YouTube personality and vlogger.
- Stephen Harding, attorney and representative for Connecticut's 107th General Assembly District.
- Darren LaBonte, CIA Officer killed in Camp Chapman attack in 2009
- Scott Lutrus (class of 2006), NFL linebacker.
- Michael Walrath, investor and CEO of Right Media.
- Scott Werndorfer, co-founder and head developer of Cerulean Studios.
- Bill Westenhofer (class of 1986), visual effects artist and two-time Academy Award winner.
- Kari Wührer (class of 1985), actress and singer.
