= Stephanie Foo =

American radio journalist and writer (born 1987)

- Born: Malaysia
- Education: University of California, Santa Cruz
- Occupations: Journalist, radio producer, author
- Employer: This American Life
- Awards: Daytime Emmy nominee (2016)

Stephanie Foo is a Malaysia-born American radio journalist, producer and author. She has worked for Snap Judgment and This American Life. In 2022, she published What My Bones Know, a memoir about healing from complex PTSD.

== Early life and education ==
Foo was born in Malaysia and moved to the United States with her family when she was two years old. She spent her childhood in San Jose, CA, and attended Piedmont Hills High. She was abandoned by her parents in her teens.

She attended the University of California, Santa Cruz, graduating from Stevenson College with a degree in literature in 2008. During her time at UCSC, she was involved with the campus radio station, KZSC.

== Career ==
=== Radio ===
Foo taught high school journalism after college, and began listening to This American Life and Radiolab. She eventually decided to try her hand at it, hitchhiking to a pornography convention in search of a story and ultimately starting a podcast called Get Me On This American Life. Another early audio project was a music podcast called Stagedive, where Foo succeeded in reaching a young demographic.

Foo was an intern then a producer at Glynn Washington's Snap Judgment, based in Oakland, then moved to This American Life.

In addition to producer roles at Snap Judgment and This American Life, Foo has also contributed to Reply All and 99% Invisible. She's drawn notice for work on topics ranging from Japanese reality television (a piece Flavorwire named to its list of the 20 best episodes in This American Life's 20-year history) to race and online dating; The New York Observer praised the latter piece as one of Reply All's "most provocative episodes."

In 2015, Foo launched her own podcast called Pilot, with each installment to serve as a pilot episode for a different genre of podcast. CBC's Lindsay Michael named Pilot to a 2016 list of five best recent podcasts, saying Foo has "created her own playground...A place where she can try things out and see how they go."

Foo served as the project lead on the development of an app from This American Life, launched in October 2016, called Shortcut. Produced in collaboration with developers Courtney Stanton and Darius Kazemi of Feel Train, Shortcut aims to allow listeners to share audio across social media sites as easily as they can share video clips via gifs. In the app, listeners can select an audio clip of up to 30 seconds and then post it directly to social media, where the audio plays alongside a transcription of the clip. At launch, the app operated on This American Life's archives, but the project was later released as open-source code, available for other audio projects to adopt. Writing at The New York Observer, Brady Dale called Foo's project "the number one innovation in podcasting" in 2016, saying, "If anything can ever make audio go viral, it’s a solution like this."

=== Writing ===
Foo has also been noted for her commentary on diversity in media, especially for her 2015 essay, "What To Do If Your Workplace Is Too White." Introducing the piece at Transom, Jay Allison said it "should be required reading for everyone involved in building our workforce or programming." At Current, Adam Ragusea praised it as "frank and funny" and Neiman Lab's Nicholas Quah called the piece "fantastic" and Foo "a force of nature."

In February 2022, Foo released the book, What My Bones Know (2022; Ballantine Books) about healing from complex PTSD. In May 2025, Foo's second memoir, I Will Give You Everything, about parenting with PTSD was announced.

== Awards ==
Foo produced This American Life's 2015 video project, "Videos 4 U: I Love You," which garnered three Daytime Emmy nominations: Best Special Class, Short Format Daytime Program; Best Writing Special Class; and Best Directing Special Class, with the project's director Bianca Giaever winning the latter category. The project also won the 2015 Webby Award for Online Film & Video in the Drama: Individual Short or Episode category.

In 2016, Foo won a Knight Foundation grant from the Knight Prototype Fund to work on the This American Life project for sharing audio clips that became the Shortcut app. Foo was also a 2016 fellow at Columbia University's Tow Center for Digital Journalism to work on the same project.

Foo served as a judge for the 2020, 2023, and 2024 American Mosaic Journalism Prize.
