= NameLab =

Brand-naming company

NameLab Inc.
- Company type: Private
- Industry: Branding, Naming services
- Headquarters: San Francisco, California, United States
- Area served: Worldwide
- Products: Business and product naming services

NameLab Inc. is an American company based in San Francisco, California that provides business and product naming services.

== Naming ==
The naming process includes identifying appropriate words and "making them a thing." Smaller than a word is a morpheme, the building block from which marketing names, such as "Lumina" are formed.

One example is how NameLab used the prefix "Acu" to help form "Acura." The prefix "Acu," which denotes "precise" in Latin and several other languages, fit the name with qualities of precision and engineering for Honda's luxury division.

The term "In-capping" involves joining and capitalizing multiple words and describes the name NameLab. It worked for clients such as AutoZone. A NameLab competitor used the idea to change its own name from Millennium Groupe to NeuVision Group LLC in the year 2000.

NameLab's Bachrach defended his business, saying, "If you make up a word, you will have much stronger proprietary rights." Also, just as do-it-yourself tax filers are H&R Block's largest competitor, the name-it-yourself approach can work: Yext named itself by combining Next and Yellow Pages.

Naming can involve psychologists, linguists and semanticists. A supporting process helps convince companies on what they're doing: STAR - "Segmentation Through Attitudinal Restructuring".

Advertising guru Al Ries said, "The name is the single most important decision you'll ever make as a company."

Much of the company's work is for naming products, with related suggestions for product characteristics, such as the color of a pill. Another part of this work is to verify that the suggested name is not already in use.

== History ==
The firm was started by Ira N. Bachrach, an electrical engineer with a Ph.D. in linguistics, in San Francisco, California in 1981.

Clients included Procter & Gamble, Johnson & Johnson, Coors, Chrysler, Federal Express, Nissan, Compaq Computer Corp. and PepsiCo.

The high point of its success was the tech boom of the late 1990s, because many startups sought names that would attract investors.
