= Russomanno =

Russomanno is a surname. Notable people with the surname include:

- Celso Russomanno (born 1956), Brazilian reporter and politician
- Conor Russomanno (born 1988), American entrepreneur, creative technologist, and lecturer
