= William Tarpeh =

Chemical engineer

William A. Tarpeh
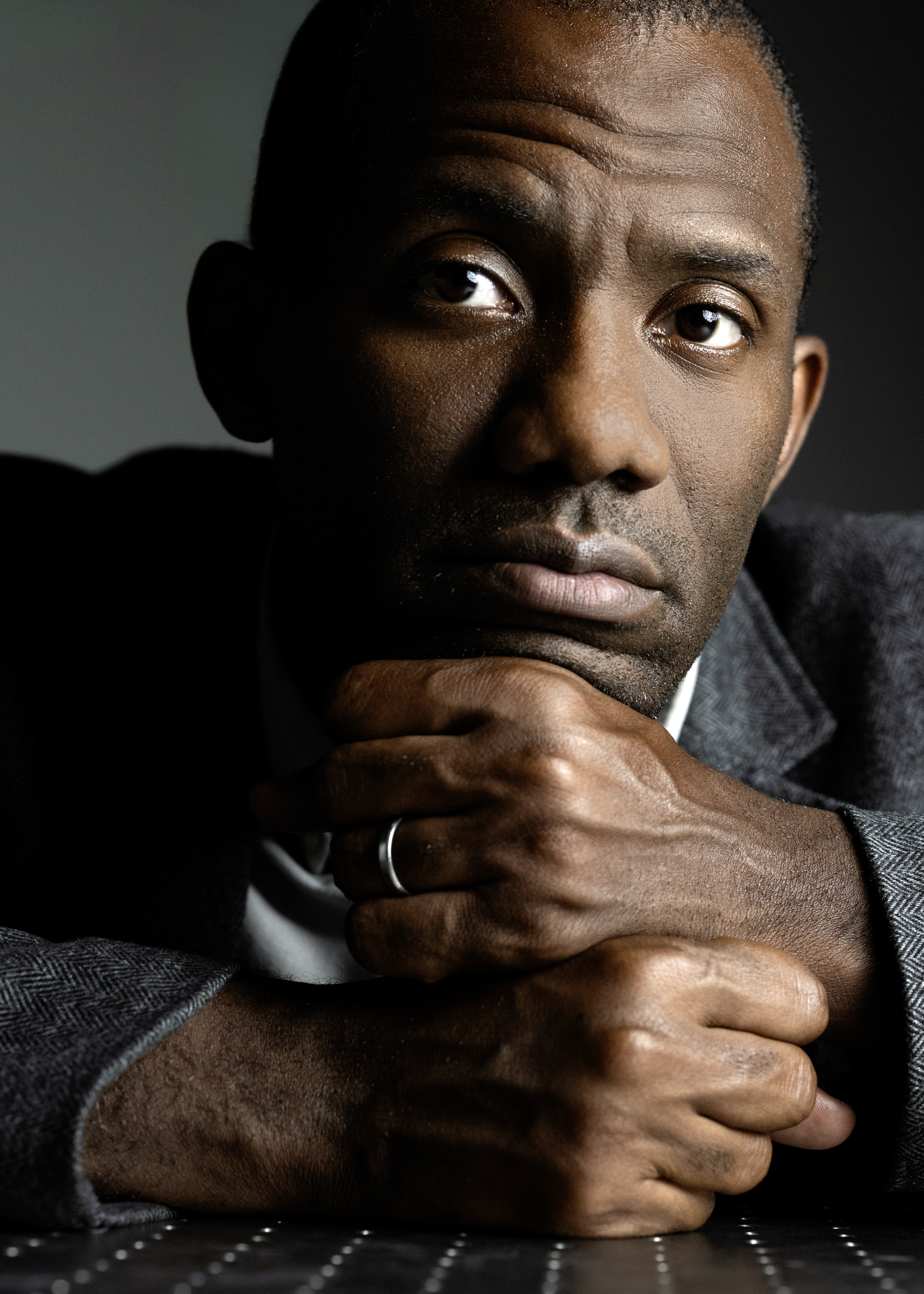
- Tarpeh in 2025
- Education: Stanford University; University of California, Berkeley
- Awards: MacArthur Fellowship
- Scientific career
- Workplaces: Stanford University
- Doctoral advisor: Kara Nelson
- Website: https://cheme.stanford.edu/people/william-tarpeh

William A. Tarpeh is an Associate Professor of Chemical Engineering at Stanford University. Tarpeh is a 2025 MacArthur Fellow. Tarpeh's research is centered around recovering valuable resources from wastewater. He is a fellow of the Stanford Precourt Institute for Energy and the Stanford Woods Institute for the Environment.

== Education ==
Tarpeh obtained his BS in chemical engineering at Stanford University in 2012 (minoring in African Studies), and his MS and PhD in environmental engineering at University of California, Berkeley (in 2013 and 2017, respectively). He was a Ron Brown Scholar (2008) and a 28twelve Foundation Fellow (2014). Tarpeh conducted postdoctoral research at the University of Michigan.

Tarpeh attended Thomas Jefferson High School for Science and Technology in Fairfax, Virginia.

== Honors ==
In 2023, Tarpeh was named among "AIChE’s 35 Under 35" and the "2023 Rising Stars in Environmental Research" by ACS Environmental Au, and in 2018 among the "Forbes 30 under 30 - Science". In 2016, Tarpeh was named by NBC in its NBCBLK28, as one of 28 African American innovators under the age of 28. Tarpeh is a Cooke Young Scholar and College Scholar of the Jack Kent Cooke Foundation, and he received the foundation's 2020 Quinn Prize. Tarpeh also won Jeopardy Kids Week at the age of twelve.

In 2025, Tarpeh earned a MacArthur Fellowship. Previously, he received a 2024 National Science Foundation CAREER Award, a 2022 Camille Dreyfus Teacher-Scholar Award, and the 2023 Paul L. Busch Award, a $100,000 research prize presented by the Water Research Foundation.

In 2024, Tarpeh gave a talk at the 2024 Stanford Reunion Homecoming.

== Research ==
Tarpeh conducts research in global sanitation in the field of development engineering, to recover resources from wastewater, turning waste chemicals into products such as fertilizers and disinfectants and cleaning the water in the process. During his PhD work, he developed a method for creating fertilizer by extracting nitrogen from urine and combining it with water. Tarpeh continues to engineer new chemical processes to extract nutrients from urine and is considered a burgeoning leader in his field.

Tarpeh's projects include ammonia recovery from wastewater, as well as the removal of lithium from spent batteries and its reuse. He develops resource recovery technologies to recycle nitrogen, sulfur, and phosphorus with minimal infrastructure and energy. Tarpeh leads pilot projects in Kenya and California, in an effort to transform how communities deal with pollution, fertilizer shortages, and climate change.

Tarpeh's work has been featured in short videos by the Jack Kent Cooke Foundation, Interesting Engineering, and the University of California, Berkeley.
