= Christine Hunsicker =

American fraudster and businesswoman

Christine Hunsicker is an American entrepreneur and convicted felon, who was sentenced to five years in U.S. federal prison on August 20, 2026. Hunsicker co-founded Gwynnie Bee, later renamed CaaStle, an online clothing rental subscription service. Following a criminal investigation, she was indicted by the US Attorney for the Southern District of New York on charges including wire fraud, securities fraud, money laundering, making false statements to a financial institution, and aggravated identity theft. In March 2026, she pleaded guilty to a single count of securities fraud.

== Early life and education ==
Hunsicker grew up in Pennsylvania, United States. She graduated from Northampton Area High School in 1995. She attended Princeton University, where she graduated with a Bachelor of Arts in Medieval Studies in 1999.

== Career ==
Prior to Gwynnie Bee, Hunsicker was COO of Drop.io and President and COO of Right Media, two tech start-ups purchased by Facebook and Yahoo!, respectively, the latter for $850 million.

In 2011, Hunsicker launched Gwynnie Bee, a subscription model clothing service. She focused first on sizes 10–32 after discovering that 80% of American women fall into this size range and are underserved by traditional retailers. Originally run out of her New York City apartment, Gwynnie Bee once operated from five offices in the US and India and employed around 350 people. The company offered more than 150 rental brands and had claimed over 3 million rental boxes shipped as of August 2016. Hunsicker appeared on Lifetime's Project Runway: Fashion Startup, a spinoff of the successful reality TV series Project Runway. Gwynnie Bee later updated its service to be size inclusive and the company changed its stated scope: a platform for retailers and brands to create rental services. Hunsicker renamed the company CaaStle, with the 'CaaS' prefix standing for Clothing-as-a-Service.

Hunsicker made television appearances, including on The Today Show and Fox Business, prior to her 2026 fraud conviction.

== Criminal Investigation ==
In 2025, Hunsicker was criminally charged with defrauding investors of $300 million following an internal review conducted by CaaStle that found she had provided investors with misstated financial statements, falsified audit opinions, and inaccurate capitalization data that understated the number of company shares outstanding. The United States Securities and Exchange Commission noted similar complaints that allege Hunsicker exaggerated profits by 7,300%. This was alongside other allegations of fraud. Hunsicker allegedly showed investors financial statements for CaaStle audited by the firm BDO in 2022; BDO stated that they did no business with CaaStle that year.

Investors also allegedly purchased shares of original company stock that were misrepresented as outstanding shares, diluting the value of these shares and generating new capital for the company to maintain solvency despite having never been profitable.

These actions led to a severe liquidity crisis at CaaStle, prompting the company to furlough all employees. Hunsicker resigned as CEO and director in March 2025, and a shareholder letter announced that the company was under investigation by law enforcement.

The CaaStle board continued to support her tenure even after being informed of the fraud she had committed against the company.

== Awards and honors ==
Prior to her fraud conviction, Hunsicker was hailed for "disrupting" and "changing the fashion game", "redesigning the plus-size clothing industry", and "personalizing the plus-size fashion experience", and was included in several lists:

- Crain's New York Business "40 Under 40"
- Inc.'s "The Most Impressive Women Entrepreneurs of 2016",
- Entrepreneur's "25 Inspiring Entrepreneurs Under 40 Who Are Creating the Next Big Thing"

== See also ==
- Elizabeth Holmes
- Charlie Javice
