= Project Runway: Fashion Startup =

American reality television series

- Genre: Reality television
- Country of origin: United States
- Original language: English
- No. of seasons: 1
- No. of episodes: 8

Production
- Executive producers: Bob Weinstein; Harvey Weinstein; Patrick Reardon; Barbara Schneeweiss; Jay Peterson; Todd Lubin; James Bruce; Mary Donahue; David Hillman
- Production companies: Matador Content; The Weinstein Company Television

Original release
- Network: Lifetime
- Release: October 20 – December 15, 2016

Project Runway: Fashion Startup is an eight-episode American reality television series that premiered on October 20, 2016 on Lifetime. This was the ninth direct spin-off series of another series, Project Runway, which airs on the same network.

On Fashion Startup, aspiring fashion and beauty entrepreneurs were given the opportunity to pitch their business ideas to a panel of investors. The panel included Katia Beauchamp, CEO and cofounder of Birchbox; Christine Hunsicker, CEO and founder of Gwynnie Bee; Rebecca Minkoff, successful fashion designer with a global lifestyle brand; and Gary Wassner, CEO of Hilldun Corp. and chairman and cofounder of Interluxe Holdings, companies that have provided financing for some of America’s and the world’s designer labels.,

== Episodes ==
=== Episode 1: Welcome to Fashion Startup ===
Original airdate: October 20, 2016

=== Episode 2: This Is Called a Bidding War ===
Original airdate: October 27, 2016

=== Episode 3: Girls Just Wanna Have Funds! ===
Original airdate: November 3, 2016

=== Episode 4: I Need to See Focus ===
Original airdate: November 10, 2016

=== Episode 5: Where's All the Cash Going? ===
Original airdate: November 17, 2016

=== Episode 6: They're Ripping You Off ===
Original airdate: December 1, 2016

=== Episode 7: Entrepreneurs are the New Rock Stars ===
Original airdate: December 8, 2016

=== Episode 8: On Point ===
Original airdate: December 15, 2016
