= Howard Lerman =

American entrepreneur

- Born: February 27, 1980 (age 46); Vienna, Virginia, United States
- Education: Duke University, Thomas Jefferson High School for Science and Technology
- Occupation: Entrepreneur
- Known for: Co-Founder and CEO of Yext, Co-Founder and Chairman of Confide
- Spouse: Wendy Lerman
- Website: www.yext.com

Howard Lerman (born February 27, 1980) is an American entrepreneur. Lerman was the CEO of Yext, a technology startup and Software as a Service company he co-founded that provides businesses with a way to update business information. This including addresses and phone numbers, to multiple channels, such as landing pages, listings, and social pages, from a single source, the Yext Knowledge Engine.

Lerman also launched Confide, an iOS app which allows professionals to send one another messages that are untraceable, operating similarly to Snapchat, but for the business world.

== Early life ==
Lerman grew up in Vienna, Virginia and graduated from Thomas Jefferson High School for Science and Technology, a magnet school with various amenities such as a $1 million supercomputer, located in Fairfax County, in 1998. In the days before the Internet, Lerman rigged a phone line to his computer to allow him to chat online with others who had done the same, including fellow hacker and future entrepreneur, Sean Parker.

In 2002, Lerman graduated from Duke University, where he studied history.

== Career ==
=== JustATip.com ===
In 2000, his sophomore year at Duke University, Lerman and two former high school classmates, Tom Dixon and Sean MacIsaac launched JustATip.com, a humorous website that allowed users to e-mail friends “tips” anonymously. Jon Stewart used the site on The Daily Show, resulting in a large increase in website traffic. In 2001, Lerman and his partners sold JustATip.com to Traffix, a publicly traded online marketer, for $150,000.

=== Intwine ===
Lerman, Dixon, and MacIsaac next founded Intwine, a consulting firm with a specialization in Microsoft’s .NET programming language. In 2005, after growing the company and reaching $5 million in sales, Lerman sold Intwine to Daltran Media for $7 million.

=== GymTicket.com ===
After seeing a salesman trying to attract new customers to a gym with a “Wheel of Savings”, Lerman came up with the idea for GymTicket.com, a lead generation service that directed people to gyms in their area. Within a year, GymTicket.com had over 3,000 gyms across the country signed up.

Lerman and his team expanded their business to include nine additional categories, including LocalVets.com and TVRepairman.com. As the group considered itself to be the "next Yellow Pages", they condensed this designation to create the company name, "Yext".

=== Yext ===
Yext's early technology model focused on the lead-generation service, which recorded customer phone calls and then charged clients based on keywords used in conversations. But while working with clients to strategize on further developing their online presence, Lerman and his colleagues recognized a consistent challenge: companies had trouble keeping tabs on all of their different online listings, and usually only noticed a problem existed when a customer complained about outdated addresses or business hours. Lerman realized that businesses would pay to get all of their online information updated for them, and he created a small company within Yext to focus on updating business listings. They developed cloud software known as "Powerlistings", which was launched in January 2011 and it was an immediate hit.

Lerman decided to focus on this business listing model, and spun out the pay-per-call business as a separate company called Felix. He then sold Felix to IAC’s CityGrid Media for $30 million in April 2012. All proceeds from the sale were reinvested to fund Yext's new Powerlistings product, now called Yext Listings. Yext's Knowledge Engine now offers a suite of products, expanding the company's services beyond simply business listings.

Forbes magazine featured Yext as one of America’s Top 25 Most Promising Companies of 2014 and 2015. Yext has been recognized as one of America's fastest-growing companies by the Inc. 5000 in 2015 and 2016, and as one of Fortune's Best Places to Work in 2014, 2015 and 2016.

Lerman stepped down as Yext's CEO in March 2022.

=== Confide ===
Lerman is the Co-Founder and Chairman of Confide with former AOL executive Jon Brod. The Confide app, which provides corporate users with the means to deliver untraceable messages, was released on January 8, 2014.

=== Roam ===
Lerman is the founder, CEO, and Chairman of Roam, a platform which bills itself as a “cloud HQ” for distributed, remote companies.

== Personal life ==
Lerman lives in Miami Beach, Florida with his wife, Wendy.
