= Michael Walrath =

American businessman (born 1975)

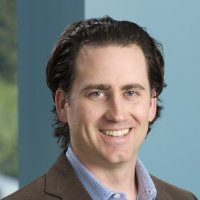
- Born: April 17, 1975 (age 51); Brookfield, Connecticut, US
- Education: Brookfield High School, University of Richmond
- Occupation: Businessman
- Known for: CEO and founder of Right Media
- Website: WGI Group

Michael Walrath (born April 17, 1975) is an American investor, advisor, and entrepreneur known for founding and leading startup and expansion-stage companies. He was the CEO and founder of Right Media, an online advertising exchange marketplace that was acquired by Yahoo for $850 million in 2007. Walrath is also a co-founder of the WGI Group, an early-stage venture capital firm.

== Early life and education ==
Walrath grew up in Brookfield, Connecticut, and graduated from Brookfield High School. In 1997, he earned a Bachelor of Arts degree in English from the University of Richmond.

== Career ==
After college, Walrath worked in promotional marketing for Reebok and held roles as a personal trainer and fitness program manager. In 1999, he joined DoubleClick, where he became the director of direct marketing and later the senior vice president of strategy and development at MaxWorldwide. During his time at DoubleClick, he helped create DoubleClick Direct, a direct marketing service.

In 2003, Walrath founded Right Media, a digital advertising exchange marketplace. The company experienced rapid growth, with revenues increasing from $1.3 million in 2003 to $34.8 million in 2006. Inc. magazine ranked Right Media 43rd on its list of the fastest-growing private companies in the United States. Walrath served as Yahoo's Senior Vice President of Advertising Strategy until 2009.

In 2009, Walrath co-founded the WGI Group with Noah and Jonah Goodhart. The venture capital firm focuses on seed investments in internet-based startups. Walrath also became chairman of Yext, a location data software company, and chairman of Moat, an analytics company specializing in digital ads.

In 2008, Walrath co-founded Atlas Films, a production company focused on feature-length documentary films addressing social issues. The company's debut film, Tapped, examined the bottled water industry's environmental and health impacts. Atlas Films also partnered with Katie Couric on The Big Picture, a documentary exploring the root causes of childhood obesity.

In 2012, Walrath acquired The Surf Lodge, a concert and nightlife venue in Montauk, New York, and became part-owner of the restaurant Swallow East, also in Montauk.

== Philanthropy ==
In 2008, Walrath and his wife, Michelle, founded the Walrath Family Foundation, which supports social, environmental, and health organizations. The foundation has contributed to environmental groups such as Grassroots Environmental Education, Food and Water Watch, and the Peconic Land Trust. The Walrath Family Foundation also supports arts initiatives and organizations focused on addressing humanitarian crises, including genocide.

== Recognition ==
In 2007, Walrath received the Ernst & Young Entrepreneur of the Year Award for his work with Right Media.
