= Extinct (2017 TV series) =

American television series

- Genre: Post-apocalyptic; Science fiction; Thriller
- Written by: Orson Scott Card and Aaron Johnston
- Directed by: Ryan Little
- Starring: Chad Michael Collins; Victoria Atkin; Jaclyn Hales; Yorke Fryer; Jack Depew; Matthew Bellows; Jake Stormoen; Kirby Heyborne; Anna Vocino
- Original language: English

Production
- Producer: Adam Abel
- Production companies: Taleswapper; Go Films

Original release
- Network: BYUtv
- Release: October 1, 2017

Extinct is a post-apocalyptic science fiction television series directed by Ryan Little and written by Orson Scott Card and Aaron Johnston. The series was picked up by BYUtv for ten episodes and premiered October 1, 2017. It is the network's second scripted television series, the first being Granite Flats.

The project was originally written to be made into a film, but BYUtv producer Adam Abel was interested in making it into a television series, and Card and Johnston re-wrote the scripts to comply with the formats.

The series was cancelled after one season.

== Premise ==
The series takes place 400 years after the human race has been exterminated by aliens. It follows Ezra, Abram, and Feena who have been revived by an alien faction for the purposes of restarting human civilization. The group cultivates their relationship with the alien restorers while dealing with conflicts from those genocidal aliens which destroyed humanity.

== Cast ==
=== Main ===
- Chad Michael Collins as Ezra
- Victoria Atkin as Feena
- Jaclyn Hales as Lynn
- Yorke Fryer as Abram
- Jack Depew as Silas
- Matthew Bellows as Jax
- Jake Stormoen as Duncan
- Kirby Heyborne as voice of Red Drone
- Anna Vocino as voice of Yellow Drone

=== Recurring ===
- Eliza de Azevedo Brown as Young Kylie
- Bailee Michelle Johnson as Adult Kylie
- Shayla McCafferey as "Forest Girl" Raven (aka Squirrel Girl)
- Anna Sward Hansen as Old Eleanor
- Aaron Johnston as voice of Blue Drone
- Nic Luken as Nicholas

=== Guest stars ===
- Cosette Shaha as Baby Kylie (episode: "Pilot")
- Jocelyn Jay Black as Toddler Kylie (episode: "Pilot")
- Joshua French as Convenience Store Clerk (episode: "Pilot")
- Jake Van Wagoner as Newscaster (episode: "Pilot")
- Denise Dorado as Althea (episode: "Broken")
- Champagne Powell as Old Abram (episode: "Broken")
- Melanie Stone as Rowen (episode: "Death Did Us Part")

== Production and filming ==
The show was filmed in Utah. Zion National Park, The Salt Flats, St. George, Kanab, Payson and Fillmore were used as locations. The main set in the LDS Motion Picture Studio in Provo was also used.

== Episodes ==
The first two episodes premiered commercial free on BYUtv October 1, 2017. Episodes 3–8 were made available to stream on byutv.org and at extinct.tv that same night. Episodes 9 and 10 were released online when they were shown as a 2-hour finale on BYUtv on November 19, 2017.

No.	Title	Original release date
1	"Pilot"	October 1, 2017
After the human race is wiped out by a mysterious alien force three humans, Ezra, Feena, and Abram, are brought back to life 400 years into the future by the mysterious Red Drone. Red Drone asks them to use the sparks to keep themselves alive and to save the human race, but first they must find shelter and protect themselves from a mysterious group known as the skin riders led by Ezra's brother Silas. In flashbacks we see how Ezra tries to protect his family from the alien invasion.
2	"Brother's Keeper"	October 1, 2017
After arriving at the shelter Yellow Drone shows Ezra, Feena, and Abram the graves of 134 individuals. A new deadly virus has risen, and it could take all of their lives. When Feena begins showing the symptoms of the virus, Ezra, Abram, and Yellow Drone must take the sparks to a nearby water source so they can create a virus antidote. However the trip will bring Ezra and Silas face-to-face and could lead to Ezra becoming a skin rider. Meanwhile, the skin rider inside Duncan becomes ill, so Duncan tries to escape. In the flashbacks we see how the relationship between Ezra and Silas became its strongest.
3	"The Contract"	October 1, 2017
Abram finds the mysterious obelisk which will allow the humans to communicate with the ones who brought them back if they can first learn how to use the ten virtues shown. We learn of the past relationship between Feena and Duncan as Feena continues to repair Red Drone. Ezra accompanies Yellow Drone to find a weapon that will destroy the skin riders, but Ezra doesn't want to use it as he is afraid it will cost his brother his life. Silas has Duncan and Jax fight to see if the human brain can overpower the skin rider symbiotic relationship.
4	"Reunion"	October 1, 2017
The obelisk decides to bring more people back. It sends Feena and Red Drone to the lake to recover the first of the new resurrections- Lynn. However the group gets cornered by the skin riders. Feena is able to escape, and Lynn is saved by a young girl who can't speak who appears to be an enemy to the skin riders. Red Drone is captured by the skin riders. The young girl leads Lynn towards the compound. Meanwhile, in the flashbacks we see Lynn was previously a nurse, and one of the patients she previously treated and saved during the invasion was none other than Jax.
5	"Broken"	October 1, 2017
After being captured by the skin riders, Lynn is given a choice by Silas- join freely, join forcibly, or die again. Meanwhile, Abram learns the hard truth about his past, Feena and Ezra set out on a rescue mission for Lynn, and Duncan and Jax are instructed to repair Red Drone so the skin riders can use the drone to suppress the human memory. However Jax turns on Duncan leaving him tied up in the winter and bringing him face-to-face with Ezra, who is unsure of whether or not to trust him.
6	"True or False"	October 1, 2017
Duncan joins Feena in a rescue mission to save Lynn and Ezra from the skin riders. If he is successful and can keep his skin rider under control, the obelisk may show a way to set them free. Meanwhile, Jax seeks the knowledge on repairing Red Drone and suppressing the human mind. During his mission the real reason for the invasion 400 years earlier is revealed. The flashback focuses on the relationship between Duncan and Feena.
7	"Of Two Minds"	October 1, 2017
Lynn realizes the skin riders may infest more than just the neck on an individual. When Yellow Drone recovers Lynn has her perform a scan on Duncan that will confirm if a skin rider possesses the entire immune system or if there is a way to safely remove them. Meanwhile, Ezra learns that the woman who knew of a possible invasion in advance is his mother Eleanor. Jax also rebels and decides to make Silas the first test subject when it comes to suppressing the human mind. The flashback focuses on Lynn and Ezra trying to rescue their daughter.
8	"Death Did Us Part"	October 1, 2017
Red Drone frees Silas from the mind control of the skin riders, but it comes with excruciating pain. If he can get him back to the sanctuary, then Silas can help them take out the skin riders surrogate crystals. Duncan realizes Red Drone has tricked them and decides to pursue. Lynn and Ezra find the human survivors base, but Jax is in pursuit and wants to take them out at all costs. Hidden amongst the survivors is their daughter Kylie, but will Kylie be willing to accept parents that don't remember anything past her turning six? And will Ezra and Lynn be willing to accept her when they learn she's engaged? And what happens when Abram learns he may have been responsible for the virus that eliminated so many?
9	"Wounds"	November 19, 2017
icon
10	"The Ancestor"	November 19, 2017
icon

== Cancellation ==
The series was cancelled after one season. In an interview Card attributed the cancellation of the show to new management at BYUtv, stating that despite positive reception, "it didn't grow in their own garden, so they didn't want it."

== Reception ==
Post Apocalyptic Media's Derek Dwilson called season 1's finale "impressive" and said "Extinct deserves to be renewed." Paste magazine says the first season is "worth paying attention to," despite spurning BYUtv's claims that the show is family friendly. Abby White says "the show features mass grave sites, killer viruses and highly aggressive bad guys who want the heroes dead. It’s not necessarily for the faint of heart, and yet the way it’s shot, edited and written makes it quite arguably a lot tamer than most sci-fi TV."

Deseret News received the pilot positively writing "this pilot...making for uneven pacing at times, but intriguing backstories and a suspenseful ending leave many questions that will most likely be explored in future episodes, creating a thought provoking sci-fi show."
