= Mark Changizi =

American theoretical cognitive scientist

- Born: 1969 (age 56–57); New Jersey, U.S.

Academic background
- Education: University of Virginia (BS); University of Maryland, College Park (PhD)

Academic work
- Discipline: Cognitive science
- Institutions: California Institute of Technology; Rensselaer Polytechnic Institute; University College Cork; Duke University

Mark Changizi (born 1969) is an American theoretical cognitive scientist. He is known for his research on evolutionary origins of biological and cognitive design, including the "Perceiving the present" hypothesis to understand optical illusions, the "Nature-Harnessing" theory for the origins of writing, speech and music, the skin-signaling hypothesis for the origins of primate red-green vision, and the rain-tread hypothesis for pruney fingers.

== Early life and education ==
Changizi was born in New Jersey in 1969. His mother is American and his father, a physicist, is from Iran. He graduated from the Thomas Jefferson High School for Science and Technology in Alexandria, Virginia. He earned a Bachelor of Science degree in physics and math from the University of Virginia and a PhD in math from the University of Maryland, College Park.

== Career ==
In 2002, he won a Sloan-Swartz Fellowship in Theoretical Neurobiology at the California Institute of Technology, and in 2007 he became an assistant professor in the Department of Cognitive Science at Rensselaer Polytechnic Institute. Changizi also conducted research at the University College Cork and Duke University.

Changizi says that visual illusions are due to a neural lag which most humans experience while awake. When light hits the retina, about one-tenth of a second goes by before the brain translates the signal into a visual perception of the world. Changizi asserts that the human visual system has evolved to compensate for neural delays by generating images of what will occur one-tenth of a second into the future. This foresight enables humans to react to events in the present, enabling humans to perform reflexive acts like catching a fly ball and to maneuver smoothly through a crowd. Although not the first to suggest this idea, he was the first to show how the idea can explain and unify a large variety of perceptual illusions.

In 2010, together with colleague Dr. Tim Barber, Changizi started the research institute 2ai Labs, with the idea to start tech companies based on his research, and subsequently bring funding toward further research at the institute. Changizi took the post of director of human cognition at 2ai.

== Publications ==
=== Books ===
- The brain from 25,000 feet, 2003
- The Vision Revolution: How the Latest Research Overturns Everything We Thought We Knew About Human Vision, 2010
- Harnessed: How Language and Music Mimicked Nature and Transformed Ape to Man, 2011
- Expressly Human: Decoding the Language of Emotion, 2022

=== Articles ===
- Changizi M A, Widders D M, 2002, "Latency correction explains the classical geometrical illusions" Perception 31(10) 1241–1262
- Changizi, M. A., Hsieh, A., Nijhawan, R., Kanai, R., & Shimojo, S. (2008). Perceiving the Present and a Systematization of Illusions. Cognitive Science, 32(3), 459–503. http://doi.org/10.1080/03640210802035191
