= Andrew Hales =

American YouTube personality and vlogger (born 1990)

- Born: May 20, 1990 (age 35); Ithaca, New York
- Education: Utah Valley University; Brookfield High School (class of 2008)
- Occupation: YouTube personality
- Years active: 2009–present
- Height: 6 ft 2 in (188 cm)
- Relatives: Jaclyn Hales (sister)

YouTube information
- Channels: LAHWF; Andrew Hales
- Genres: Pranks, vlogs, interviews
- Website: lahwf.me

Andrew Gerald Hales (born May 20, 1990) is an American YouTube personality and vlogger known for his channel LAHWF, which has videos consisting of pranks/social experiments and interviews.

== Early life ==
Hales was born on May 20, 1990, in Ithaca, New York in a Mormon family but no longer practices the religion. His father, as a pharmaceutical salesman, moved their family from New York to New Hampshire and then to Bountiful, Utah. Although he grew up in multiple places, he calls Utah his home state. He also lived in Brookfield, Connecticut for a large part of his life and graduated Brookfield High School class of 2008 prior to attending Utah Valley University for 3 years.

== YouTube ==
Hales started filming videos for his channel at UVU, but had to leave and go to other places such as BYU because people started to recognize him. He has filmed videos around the globe as well as places around the United States, such as New York, Los Angeles, Colorado, Idaho, Miami, London, Rome, Amsterdam, and Chengdu in China. He paid for school using money earned from his videos.

=== LAHWF ===
LAHWF, the name of Hales's YouTube channel, stands for "losing all hope was freedom," a quote from the 1999 film Fight Club.

=== "Holding People's Hand" ===
Hales as a part of UVU students filmed a video where he went to random people who are walking by and tried to awkwardly hold their hands, this original prank idea was released on June 11, 2012, and went viral. The second part of this video which Hales was on a family vacation, filmed in Lake George, New York featuring his sister Jaclyn and was released on July 22, 2012.

=== Macklemore Look-alike ===
On October 28, 2013, Hales released a video which was recorded during Macklemore & Ryan Lewis's tour stop at Utah's Maverik Center where he wears a hoodie and sunglasses and pretends to be Macklemore and starts pranking people. Later on, Macklemore reacted to this prank on Twitter.

=== "Acting Out The Notebook with Girls" ===
In February 2015, Hales released a video recorded at the USC, in which he acted out the famous kissing scene from the Notebook with random participants. The girl who first showed up in the video, later appeared in the extras from his 2016 video, "What are you guys talking about?" in which he returned to USC.

=== Chatting With ===
In 2017, Hales began a series of interview videos titled, "Chatting With". Episodes have featured internet personalities, young millionaires, a Sasquatch witness, a survivor of the Columbine shooting, a supporter of the Voluntary Human Extinction Movement, and many others.

== Adderall ==
Hales has talked about how he was diagnosed with ADD many times and released a documentary video about Adderall on August 8, 2016. He mentioned he was prescribed Adderall about 6 months before he started his channel and said he has never seen the doctor who diagnosed him with ADD again. He also said that Adderall is the reason behind all his videos, but mentioned he doesn't want to talk about the subject because he doesn't take treatment any more.
