= Coalition for TJ v. Fairfax County School Board =

Pending lawsuit

- Court: United States Court of Appeals for the Fourth Circuit
- Full case name: Coalition for TJ v. Fairfax County School Board
- Argued: September 16, 2022
- Decided: May 23, 2023
- Citation: 68 F.4th 864 (4th Cir. 2023).

Case history
- Appealed from: United States District Court for the Eastern District of Virginia
- Appealed to: Supreme Court of the United States
- Subsequent action: Cert. denied.

Court membership
- Judges sitting: Robert Bruce King, Allison Jones Rushing, Toby J. Heytens

Case opinions
- Decision by: King
- Concurrence: Heytens
- Dissent: Rushing

Keywords
- Affirmative action; Racial discrimination; Equal protection; Asian diaspora; Education

Coalition for TJ v. Fairfax County School Board, 68 F.4th 864 (4th Cir. 2023), is a United States Court of Appeals for the Fourth Circuit case about the changes to Thomas Jefferson High School for Science and Technology's admissions policy which were made in 2020. The Coalition for TJ, a local single-issue advocacy group, alleged that the changes that Fairfax County Public Schools made to the school's admission policy unfairly discriminate against Asian Americans. After the United States District Court for the Eastern District of Virginia ruled in favor of the Coalition for TJ in February 2022, FCPS appealed the ruling to the United States Court of Appeals for the Fourth Circuit, which reversed the district court in May 2023.

On August 21, 2023, the Coalition petitioned the Supreme Court to hear its case. On February 20, 2024, the Court declined to hear the case by denying certiorari.

== Background ==
Thomas Jefferson High School for Science and Technology (TJ) is a prestigious public magnet school that serves part of Northern Virginia. Students are admitted during eighth grade, for entrance the following year, to a class of around 500 students. Prior to 2020, admissions were principally conducted through applicants taking a standardized test, submitting letters of recommendation, and writing essays. In the fall of 2020, the Fairfax County School Board revised the admissions process, dropping the standardized test, removing the $100 application fee, and allocating a small number of seats in the incoming class of 2025 to each public middle school in the region, while evaluating students on their grades, essays, and "experience factors, including students who are economically disadvantaged, English language learners, special education students, or students who are currently attending underrepresented middle schools." Admissions for the class of 2025 saw Asian-American applicants receive 54% of the admissions offers, a decline from 73% for the class of 2024 (which was conducted under the previous policy). The shares of white, black, and Hispanic students admitted increased.

The Coalition for TJ, a local single-issue advocacy group, opposed the changes to the admissions policy, asserting they would have a disparate impact on Asian applicants and the policy change was intended to racially balance the student body by reducing the number of Asian students (citing the public statements made by the Fairfax County School Board members). It is represented by the Pacific Legal Foundation.

Racial Composition of Admitted TJHSST Classes (Percent)
	2020 (Before Reform)	2021 (After Reform)
Asian	73.0	54.36
White	17.7	22.36
Black	≤2.1 (Note: In 2020, the number of black students admitted was 10 or fewer. FCPS did not report the exact number in order to protect student privacy. Since 486 students were admitted, this means the percentage of those students who were black was at most 2.1%.)	7.09
Hispanic	3.3	11.27
Multiracial/Other	6.0	4.91

== Lower court proceedings ==
=== District court ===
On March 10, 2021, the Coalition filed suit in the United States District Court for the Eastern District of Virginia, challenging the admissions policy as enacted with discriminatory intent against applicants of Asian descent, under Village of Arlington Heights v. Metropolitan Housing Development Corp. The case was assigned to Judge Claude M. Hilton. The Coalition twice sought preliminary injunctions blocking use of the 2020 admissions policy; Hilton denied them on May 26, 2021, and September 20, 2021. A bench trial was scheduled to begin January 24, 2022; Hilton canceled it on January 18, after the parties agreed there was no genuine dispute as to any material fact.

On February 25, 2022, Hilton granted the Coalition's motion for summary judgment and permanently enjoined enforcement of the 2020 admissions policy. In the opinion, he wrote the policy was "[a] means to accomplish [the Board's] goal of achieving racial balance, was to decrease enrollment of the only racial group 'overrepresented' at T.J.—Asian Americans. The board employed proxies that disproportionately burden Asian American students."

On March 4, 2022, the School Board sought a stay of the injunction pending appeal. Hilton denied it on March 11.

=== Court of appeals ===
On March 14, 2022, the Fairfax County School Board appealed the district court's permanent injunction against the 2020 admissions policy to the United States Court of Appeals for the Fourth Circuit. Former Solicitor General of the United States Donald B. Verrilli Jr. represents the board pro bono. The board sought to stay the decision pending resolution of the appeal. On March 31, 2022, the Fourth Circuit granted the stay in a 2–1 order. The majority was unreasoned; Judges Robert Bruce King and Toby Heytens joined it; Heytens also wrote a separate concurrence outlining his disagreement with Hilton's reasoning. Judge Allison Jones Rushing dissented.

On April 8, 2022, the Coalition filed an emergency application in the Supreme Court of the United States to have the Fourth Circuit's stay vacated. Virginia and 15 other states filed an amicus curiae brief supporting the request. On April 25, 2022, the application was denied over the dissents of Associate Justices Clarence Thomas, Samuel Alito, and Neil Gorsuch. The case was heard in the court of appeals on September 16, 2022, and decided on May 23, 2023. The Fourth Circuit, by a 2 to 1 vote, reversed the district court and restored the new admission plan.

== Supreme Court ==
On August 21, 2023, the Coalition petitioned the Supreme Court to hear its case. On February 20, 2024, the Court declined to hear the case by denying certiorari. Justice Alito, with whom Justice Thomas joined, wrote a dissent from the denial of certiorari.
