= Brookfield School District =

School district in Connecticut, United States

Location
- Brookfield Fairfield County, Connecticut United States

District information
- Type: Public
- Motto: "Create Your Tomorrow"
- Grades: Pre K-12
- Superintendent: Dr. John Barile
- Schools: 3
- Budget: $68,347,000 (2020-2021 school year)
- NCES District ID: 0900540

Students and staff
- Students: 2,563
- Teachers: 217.70 (on an FTE basis)
- Student–teacher ratio: 11.99

Other information
- Website: brookfield.k12.ct.us

The Brookfield School District is a public school district located in Fairfield County, in Brookfield, Connecticut, United States. Brookfield has three public schools and six private schools. The District Superintendent is Dr. John Barile and the District Assistant Superintendent is Dr. Anna Mahon.

== Elementary School ==
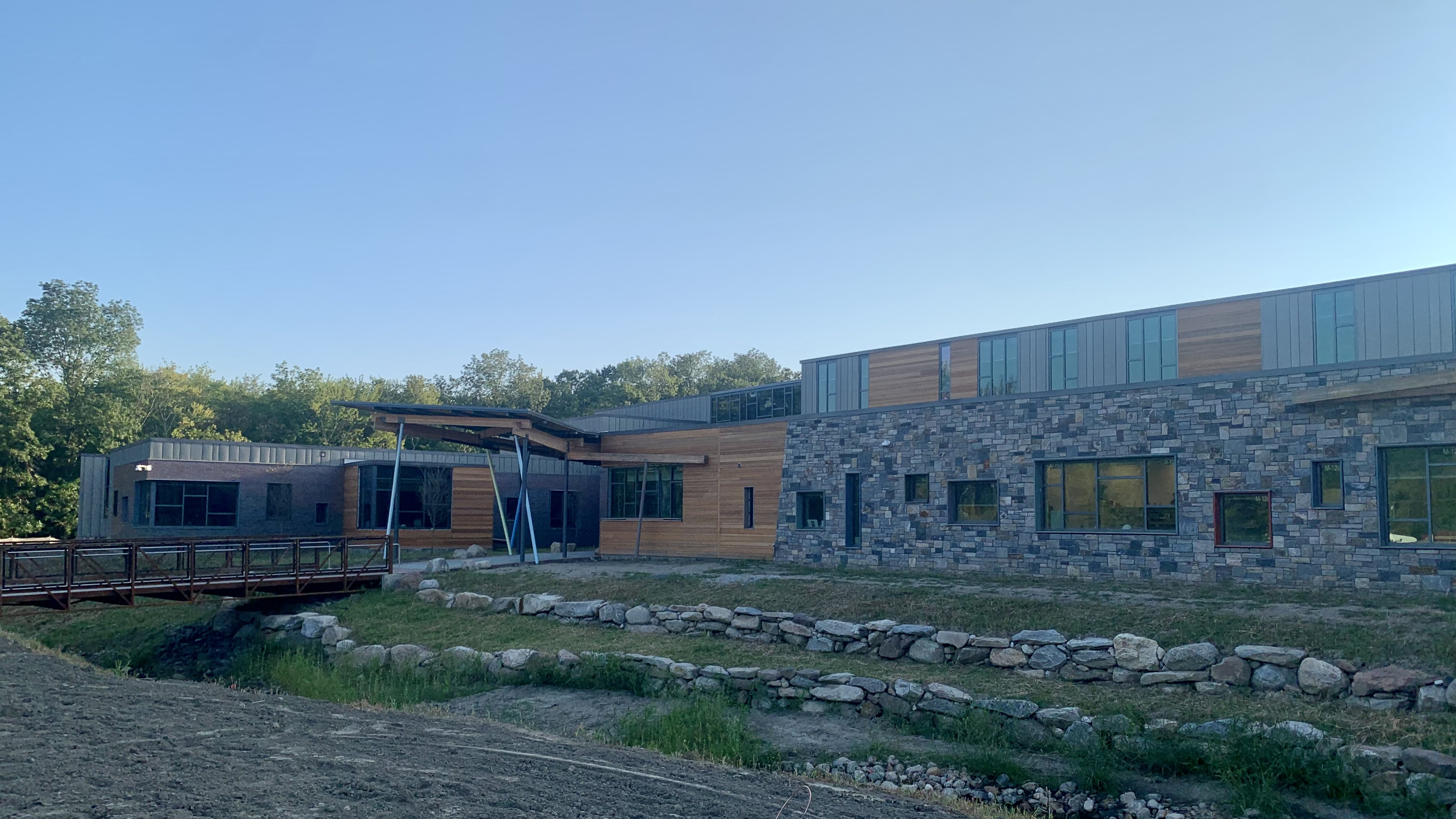
Exterior of Candlewood Lake Elementary School

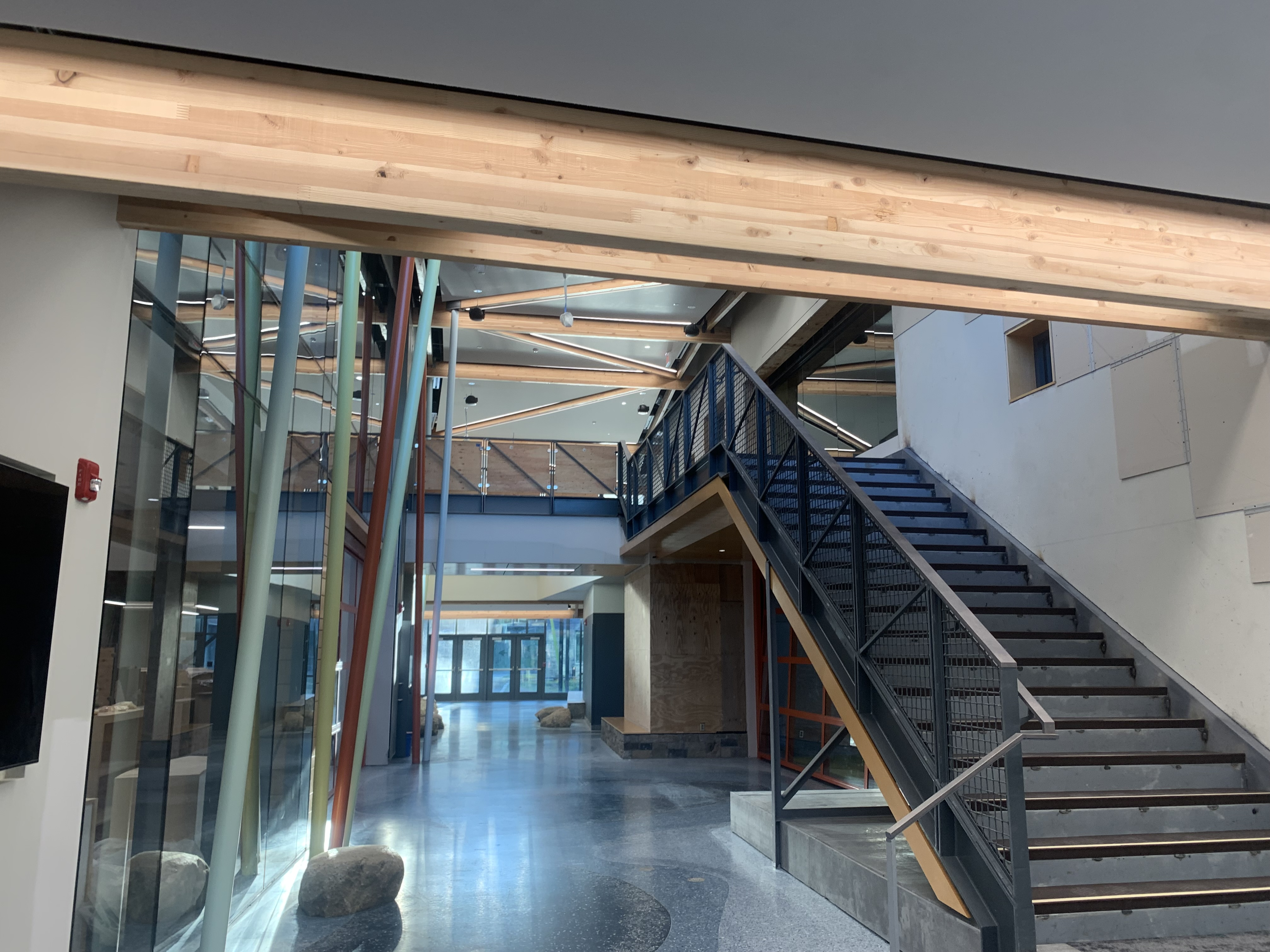
Interior of Candlewood Lake Elementary School

- Candlewood Lake Elementary School (grades Pre K-5)

== Middle school ==
- Whisconier Middle School (grades 6-8)

== High school ==
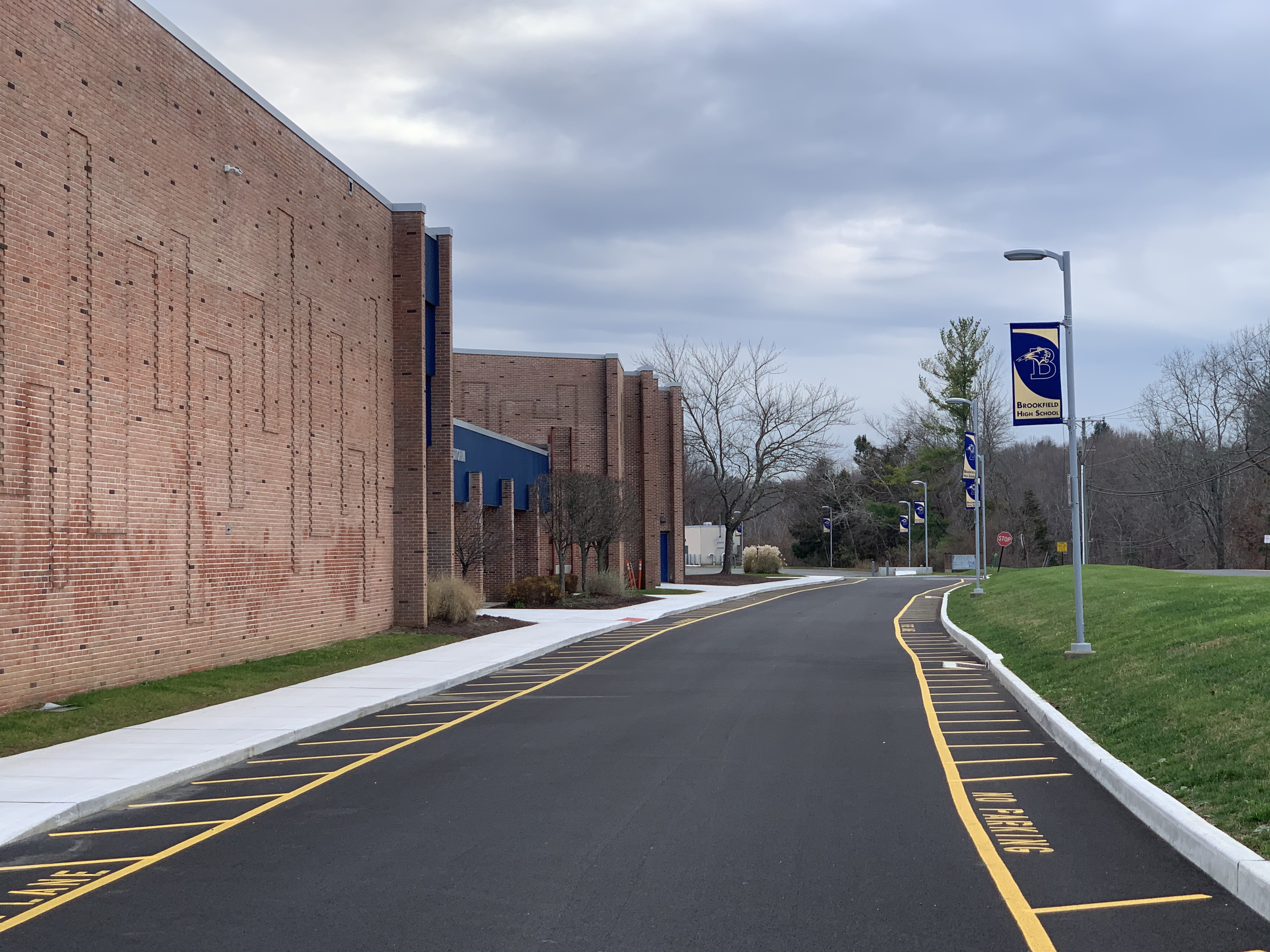
Exterior of Brookfield High School

- Brookfield High School (grades 9-12)
