= Jaclyn Hales =

American actress (born 1986)

- Born: September 4, 1986 (age 39); Syracuse, New York, U.S.
- Education: Utah Valley University
- Occupation: Actress
- Years active: 2002–present
- Relatives: Andrew Hales (brother)

Jaclyn Hales (born September 4, 1986) is an American actress best known for acting in BYUtv scripted series Extinct, The Sinister Surrogate (2018), Scents and Sensibility (2011), Unicorn City (2012), Christmas Eve (2015), Alienate (2016). and Cypher (2021).

== Early life ==
Hales was born in Syracuse, New York, after a while her family moved to Portsmouth, her first acting as a character was at a small theater in Alice in Wonderland as "Shrunken Alice" at the age of six, when she became a teenager, her family moved to Utah where she became a film actress, first playing in The WB series Everwood.

Hales attended Utah Valley University for four years, graduating with a BS, majoring in theater performance.

== Filmography ==
=== Television ===
Year	Title	Role	Notes
2002-2006	Everwood	Katherine Adams	
2016	Random Acts	Herself - Host	5 episodes: Illusion Reunion; Quilting Life Back Together; Ninja Makeover; Missed Christmas; Driveway Dream
2017	Extinct	Lynn	
2021	Cypher	Claire	

=== Film ===
Year	Film	Role	Notes
2011	Scents and Sensibility	Lucy Steele	
2012	Unicorn City	Marsha	
2012	Changing Hearts	Kate	
2013	The Caper Kind/Swiss Mistake	Swiss Concierge	Short
2015	Christmas Eve	Lila	
2016	Alienate	Samantha Hayes	
2018	The Sinister Surrogate	Kailee	
2023	A Belgium Chocolate Christmas	Kate	
