= OpenBCI =

Open-source brain-computer interface platform

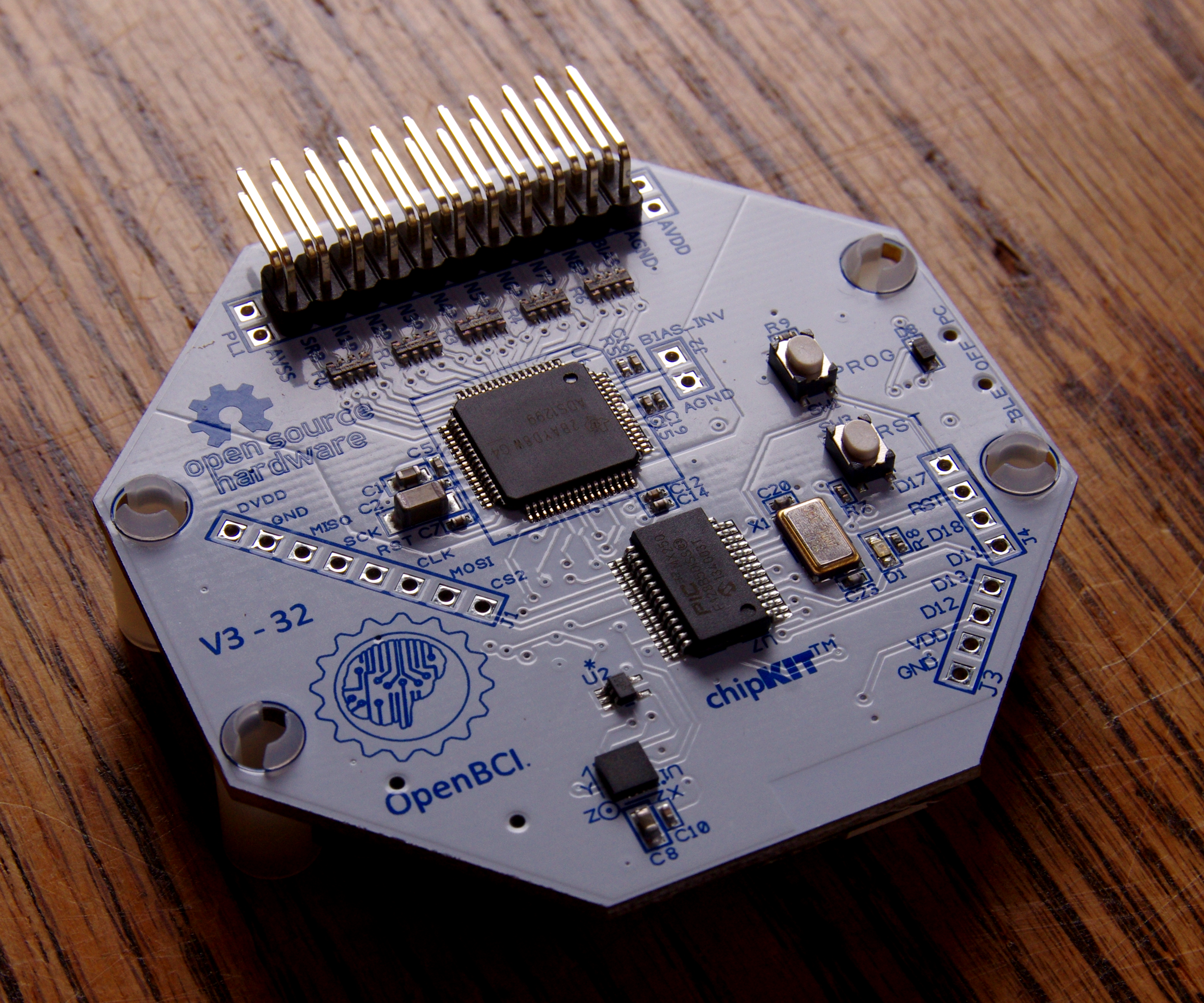
OpenBCI 32bit Board

OpenBCI is an open-source brain–computer interface platform created by Joel Murphy and Conor Russomanno, after a successful Kickstarter campaign in late 2013. The company's headquarters is based in Brooklyn, NY.

OpenBCI boards are low-cost biometric amplifiers used to measure and record electrical activity produced by the brain (EEG), muscles (EMG), and heart (EKG). The boards are compatible with standard EEG electrodes. They can be used with the open-source OpenBCI GUI software, or they can be integrated with other open-source EEG signal processing tools. OpenBCI boards have been scientifically validated in numerous research studies.

== Hardware ==
The OpenBCI 32-bit board uses the ADS1299, an IC developed by Texas Instruments for biopotential measurements. The OpenBCI uses a microcontroller for on-board processing — the 8bit version (now deprecated) uses an Arduino-compatible ATmega328P IC, while the 32bit board uses a PIC microcontroller — and can write the EEG data to an SD card, or transmit it to software on a computer over a bluetooth link.

In 2015, OpenBCI announced the Ganglion board with a 2nd Kickstarter campaign. It has 4 input channels for measuring EEG, EMG, and EKG, and is also Bluetooth enabled. Initially it was offered on Kickstarter at $99, before later being listed at $249.99, and subsequently increasing in price to $499.00.

== Software ==
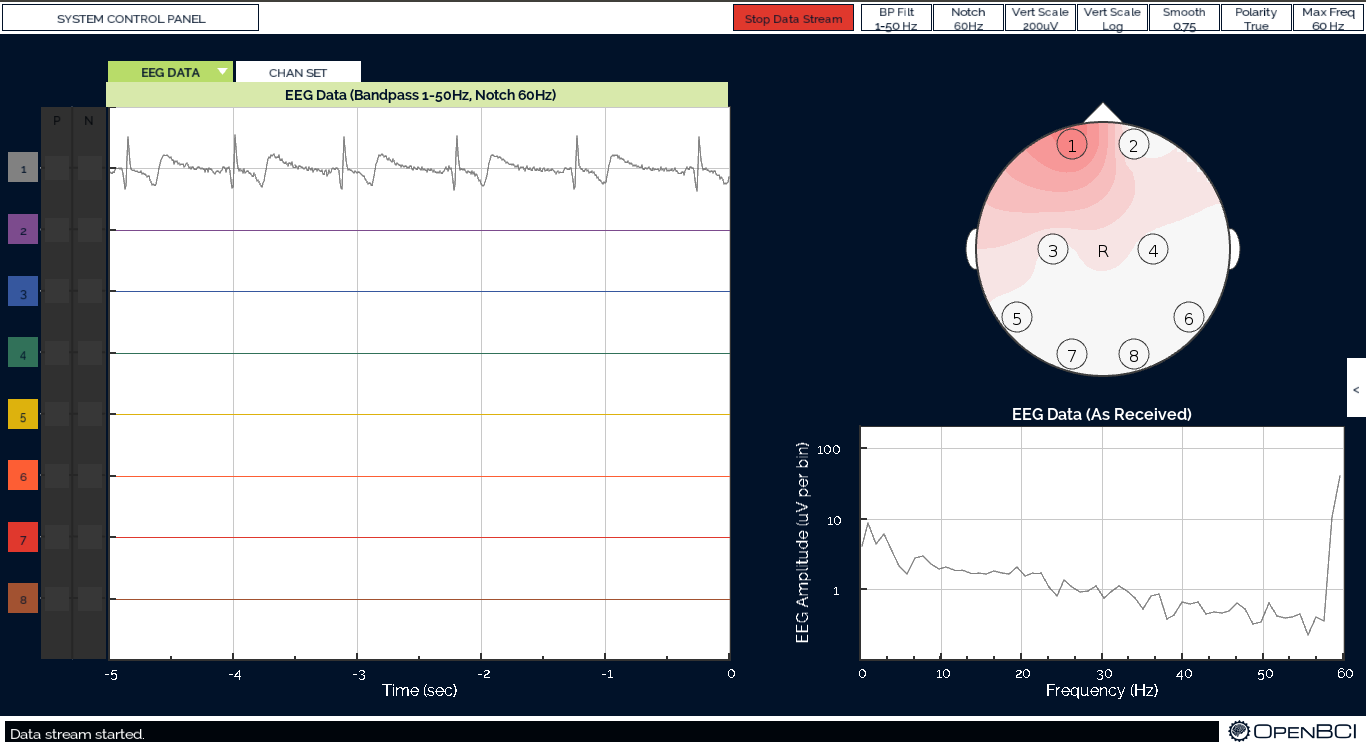
Screenshot of the OpenBCI Processing application displaying a basic electroencephalogram

OpenBCI has released an open-source application for use with the OpenBCI, written with Processing. Display and processing software written in NodeJS and Python are also available.

== 3D Printed Headset ==
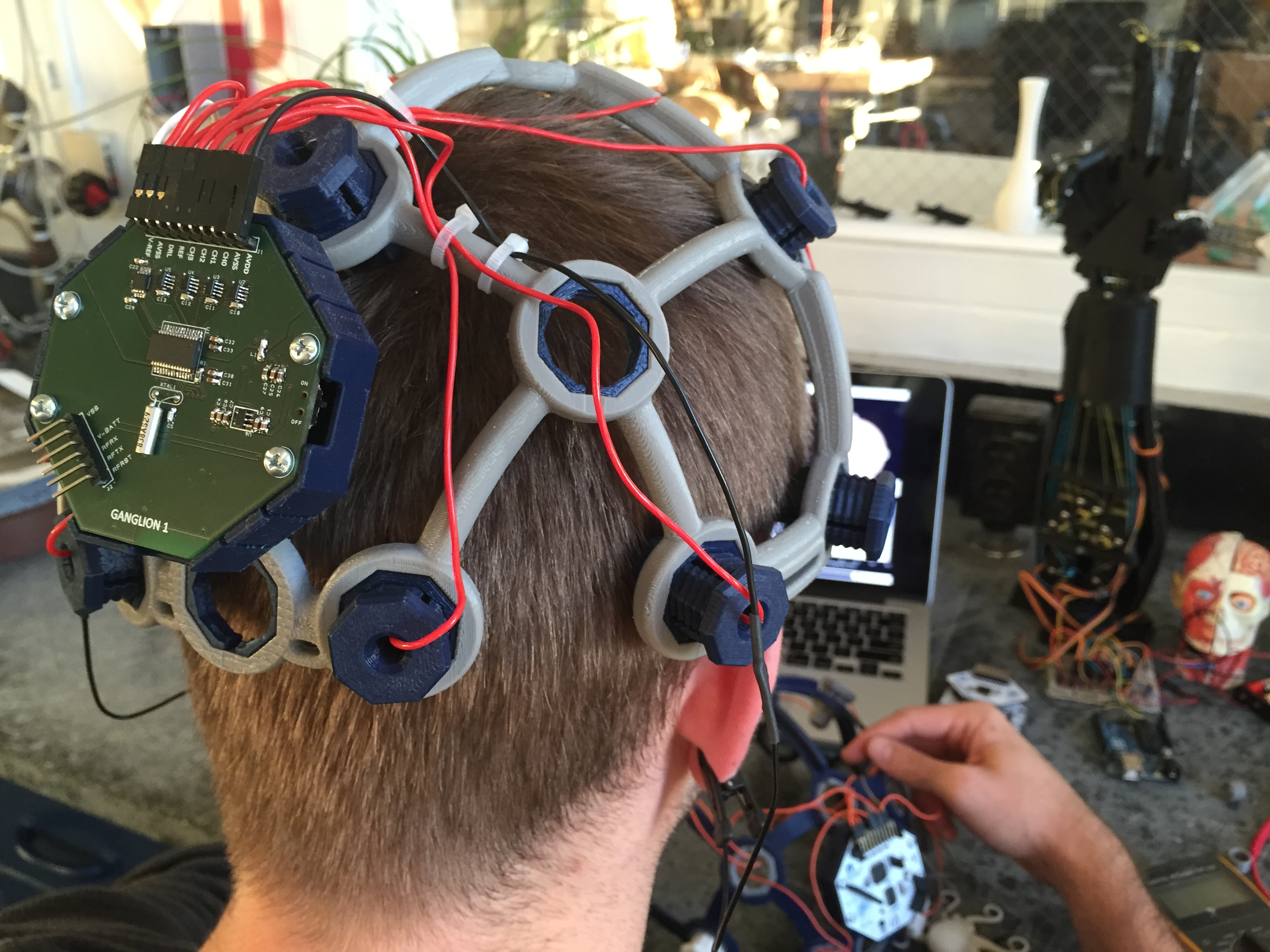
Conor Russomanno wearing the Ultracortex Mark III and Ganglion Board

Design files for a 3D printed headset for pre-production OpenBCI boards have been released on GitHub. The headset, known as the Ultracortex, holds the electrodes in place, and makes it easy to configure their placement using the 10–20 System. The current iteration of the Ultracortex is called the Ultracortex "Mark IV". The headset design files are available for free download from OpenBCI's GitHub account, or the headset can be purchased preprinted from the OpenBCI online store. The headsets are manufactured and produced by Voodoo Manufacturing.

== Applications ==
OpenBCI technology has been utilized in various innovative applications, such as controlling a HexBug robot using steady-state visually evoked potentials SSVEPs (Steady State Visually Evoked Potentials). Locked in graffiti artist Tempt One has used the OpenBCI and the low-cost Eyewriter eye-tracking system to continue to draw after being diagnosed with the degenerative nerve disorder ALS.

In 2023 OpenBCI's CEO & cofounder, Conor Russomanno, presented the talk A powerful new neurotech tool for augmenting your mind on the TED main stage alongside Christian Bayerlein, a web developer and accessibility activist based in Koblenz, Germany. In the talk, Russomanno and Bayerlein presented the Neurofly project, which combined OpenBCI technology and a Varjo HMD to enable Bayerlein to pilot a drone around the stage completely hands-free. Bayerlein used EEG and EMG signals to control the drone's speed and direction.

== Galea ==
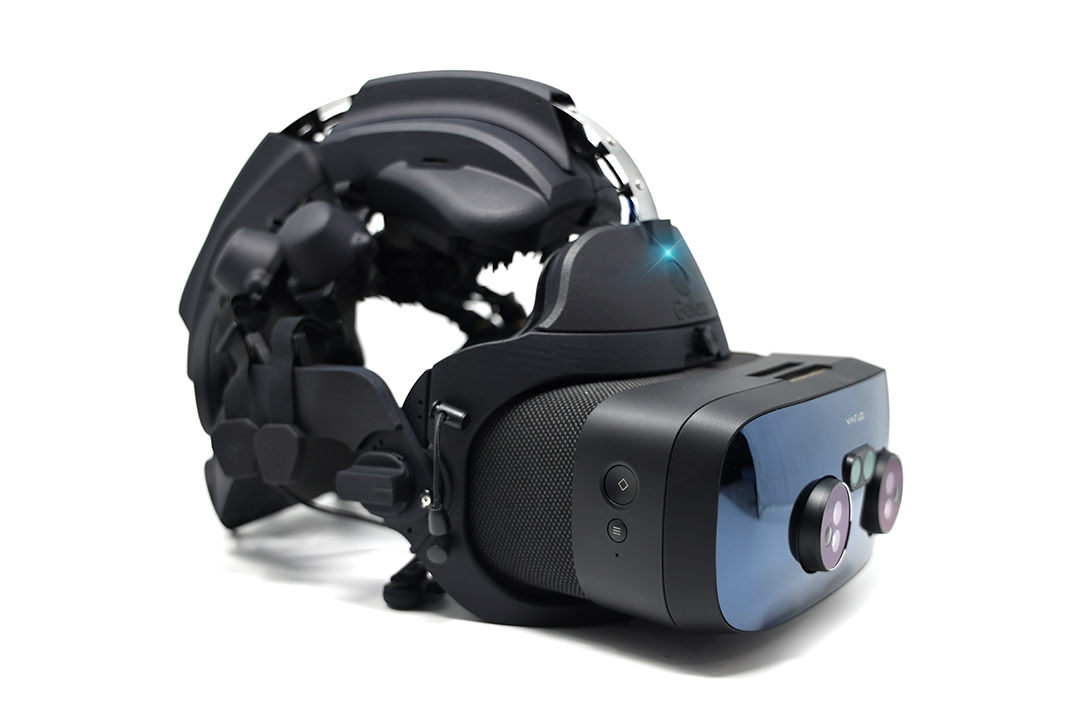
The OpenBCI Galea device mounted with a Varjo XR-3 HMD.

In late 2020, the OpenBCI team unveiled a new product: Galea. Galea is a hardware and software platform that merges next-generation biometrics with mixed reality. It is the first device that integrates EEG, EMG, EDA, PPG, and eye-tracking into a single headset.

After several years of development and manufacturing, OpenBCI began shipping Galea Beta unit pre-orders in August 2024. The current lead time for a Galea unit is 2 weeks.

== Awards & Recognition ==
OpenBCI has been the recipient of several technology and innovation awards, including 2 Consumer Electronic Show (CES) 2023 Innovation Awards. Their latest product, Galea, was awarded in both the Virtual & Augmented Reality, and Wearable Technologies categories. Galea has also previously won a Unity Aerospace & Defense award and an AWE Auggie Award for Best Interaction Product

After the successful 2023 TED talk was met with standing ovation, NPR featured OpenBCI and Galea in a TED Radio Hour episode called Brain Hacks: The beginning of mind-reading technology? No, it's not science fiction

OpenBCI has also had several other notable media features including in the episode The tech harnessing the power of thought of CNN's Decoded series. They were also featured in a Lenovo customer success video called Neural interfaces: The future of brain-computer interaction.

== See also ==
- List of open-source hardware projects
