= Darius Kazemi =

Computer programmer and artist

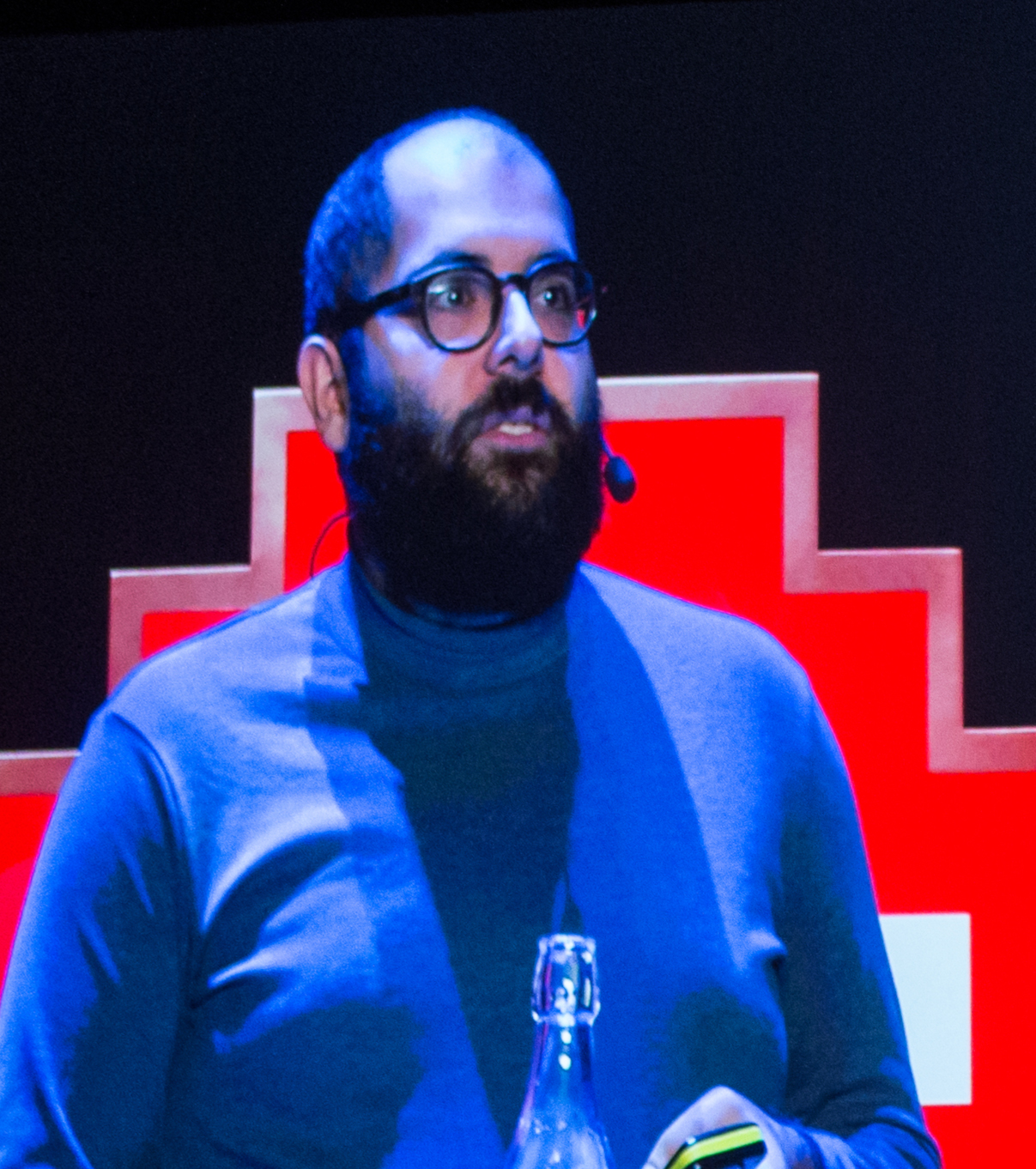
- Kazemi in 2016
- Born: July 28, 1983 (age 43)
- Education: Thomas Jefferson High School for Science and Technology; Worcester Polytechnic Institute
- Occupations: Computer programmer, artist
- Employer: Feel Train

Darius Kazemi (born 1983) is an American computer programmer and artist. Kazemi and Courtney Stanton are the co-founders of the technology collective Feel Train.

== Early life ==
Kazemi was born on July 28, 1983. He attended Thomas Jefferson High School for Science and Technology in Virginia, then college at Worcester Polytechnic Institute in Massachusetts from which he graduated in 2005 with a Bachelor of Science degree in Electrical Engineering.

== Career ==
After college, Kazemi became a video game designer.

In 2012, Kazemi began making bots on Twitter, drawing particular attention for work like his "wordfilter", a feature that enabled bots to avoid racial slurs.

Kazemi is the author of Jagged Alliance 2, a book describing the people and process behind the development of the video game Jagged Alliance 2. Kazemi's text is the fifth in a series of books on video games published by Boss Fight Books.

In 2015, Kazemi released a project called the "Ethical Ad Blocker," which not only blocked ads, but also blocked all websites that contained ads, so that users would not take content for free from sites that rely on advertising dollars. Speaking to Vice's Motherboard, Kazemi explained the project, which made a huge number of websites inaccessible to those who'd enabled the Ethical Ad-Blocker was meant to dramatize the conflict traditional ad-blockers raise in allowing users to avoid ads but depriving websites of the revenue streams they rely on: "I like the idea of codifying a moral high road and then showing people in practice that the moral high ground is not an attainable thing."

In 2016, Kazemi released a Bernie Sanders video game, called Bubble Burst Bernie, developed with Rob Dubbin and artist Tim Luecke for The Late Show with Stephen Colbert.

At Feel Train, Kazemi and Stanton have developed the StayWokeBot in collaboration with activists DeRay Mckesson and Samuel Sinyangwe, as well as the Shortcut app with radio program This American Life, which allows listeners to share audio clips on social media much like gifs facilitate sharing video clips. Feel Train has a forthcoming Twitter bot project called Relive 44 that, beginning in May 2017, will repost every tweet from President Barack Obama (President Obama posted his first message to Twitter in May 2009).

In 2016, Kazemi started researching and developing software for decentralized social media and the fediverse. In 2018, he was awarded a Mozilla-Ford Open Web fellowship, where he studied the technical infrastructure of the fediverse and people's decisions to leave centralized social media for decentralized services. In 2023 Kazemi was awarded a research grant from the Digital Infrastructure Insights Fund along with Erin Kissane, building on his prior work, and focusing on community governance and moderation in decentralized social media servers. Kazemi currently works for the Applied Social Media Lab at the Berkman Klein Center for Internet & Society, at Harvard University.
