= Scott Lutrus =

American football player (born 1988)

No. 56
- Position: Linebacker

Personal information
- Born: April 23, 1988 (age 38); Brookfield, Connecticut, U.S.
- Listed height: 6 ft 3 in (1.91 m)
- Listed weight: 247 lb (112 kg)

Career information
- High school: Brookfield
- College: Connecticut
- NFL draft: 2011: undrafted

Career history
- Jacksonville Jaguars (2011)*; St. Louis Rams (2011)*; Indianapolis Colts (2011−2013); Brooklyn Bolts (2015)
- * Offseason or practice squad member only

Awards and highlights
- Second-team All-Big East (2008); First-team Freshman All-American (2007)

Career NFL statistics
- Total tackles: 7
- Stats at Pro Football Reference

Scott Lutrus (born April 23, 1988) is an American former professional football player who was a linebacker in the National Football League (NFL). He played college football for the Connecticut Huskies. After college, he was signed by the Jacksonville Jaguars as an undrafted free agent in 2011. After time on various practice squads, he joined the Brooklyn Bolts of the Fall Experimental Football League (FXFL).

== Early life ==
Lutrus grew up and attended high school in Brookfield, Connecticut. In football, he was named to the all-state team by the New Haven Register during his senior year, and was named the 2006 Connecticut Gatorade Player of the Year after rushing for 2,017 yards and 34 touchdowns, as well as 63 tackles and four interceptions (two returned for touchdowns) playing defense. He was ranked as a two-star recruit. During his junior year, Brookfield fell short of a league title after losing to the undefeated state champion Pomperaug Panthers in the SWC Championship game.

== College career ==
Lutrus played college football at the University of Connecticut, where he majored in economics and was a four-year starter on the team. He redshirted in 2006, but he became a starter in 2007 at the strongside linebacker position, accumulating 106 tackles. He was the first player since 1999 to be named the Big East Defensive Player of the Week in back-to-back weeks, and after the season he was named to the Freshman All-America team. In 2008, he led the team in tackles at the same position and was named to the All-Big East second team. In 2009 and 2010, a recurring neck injury kept him sidelined for eight games, but he was a team captain each year and recorded 69 and 59 tackles, respectively.

== Professional career ==
Pre-draft measurables
Height	Weight	40-yard dash	10-yard split	20-yard split	20-yard shuttle	Three-cone drill	Vertical jump	Broad jump	Bench press	Wonderlic
6 ft 2 3/8 in (1.89 m)	241 lb (109 kg)	4.68 s	1.56 s	2.61 s	4.09 s	6.89 s	38 in (0.97 m)	10 ft 1 in (3.07 m)	x reps	x
All values from NFL Combine

=== Jacksonville Jaguars ===
Lutrus was projected to go as high as the fifth round in the 2011 NFL Draft, but ended up being undrafted, and he was considered one of the top undrafted players available. After the 2011 NFL lockout ended, Lutrus was quickly signed by the Jacksonville Jaguars as a middle linebacker. He was projected to be a special teams player and backup linebacker, but was released on September 2.

=== St. Louis Rams ===
Lutrus was signed to the Rams' practice squad on September 5, 2011.

=== Indianapolis Colts ===
Lutrus was signed off of the Rams' practice squad by the Colts on November 29, 2011. He was placed on injured reserve on August 14, 2012. On August 1, 2013, Lutrus was waived/injured by the Colts.

=== Brooklyn Bolts ===
After being waived by the Colts, Lutrus joined the Brooklyn Bolts of the Fall Experimental Football League (FXFL).
