= Kara Nelson =

American civil engineer

Kara L. Nelson is an American civil engineer specializing in water quality, water treatment, and waterborne disease pathogens and their removal. She is a professor of civil and environmental engineering at the University of California, Berkeley, where she holds the Blum Chancellor's Chair in Development Engineering. She is the president-elect of the Association of Environmental Engineering and Science Professors.

== Education and career ==
Nelson majored in biophysics as an undergraduate at the University of California, Berkeley, receiving her bachelor's degree in 1992. While a student at Berkeley, Nelson took a gap year to work with refugees in Zimbabwe. She learned through her work about the lack of access to clean water and sanitation in the developing world, inspiring her to work in infrastructure engineering. After a 1996 master's degree in environmental engineering at the University of Washington, she completed her Ph.D. in environmental engineering at the University of California, Davis in 2001. Her doctoral research included 20 months in Mexico working with a team from the National Autonomous University of Mexico on wastewater treatment.

She returned to Berkeley as an assistant professor in the Department of Civil and Environmental Engineering in 2001. She was tenured as an associate professor in 2008, promoted to full professor in 2013, and given the Blum Chancellor's Chair in Development Engineering in 2020.

From 2017 to 2021 she was Associate Dean for Equity and Inclusion in the UC Berkeley College of Engineering. Since 2023 she has been associate director of development engineering in the Blum Center for Developing Economies.

== Recognition ==
Blum was a 2003 recipient of the Presidential Early Career Award for Scientists and Engineers, given "for developing rigorous scientific methods and quantitative tools to address the worldwide public health threat posed by human pathogens in water".

She was a Fulbright Fellow in 2014, funding her for travel to Colombia.
