= Conor Russomanno =

Entrepreneur, creative technologist and lecturer

- Born: October 29, 1988 (age 37); Livingston, New Jersey, United States
- Education: Columbia University (BS), Parsons School of Design (MFA)
- Occupations: Co-founder & CEO of OpenBCI
- Website: conorrussomanno.com

Conor Russomanno is an American entrepreneur, inventor, and public speaker, specializing in the development of human-computer interfaces. He is the co-founder and CEO of OpenBCI, a company dedicated to open source innovation of brain-computer interface technologies.

Russomanno has also served as an adjunct professor at Parsons School of Design and NYU Tisch School of the Arts, and as a Research Affiliate at the MIT Media Lab.

In 2018, he was honored on the Forbes 30 Under 30 list in the category of Science. In April 2023, Russomanno delivered a TED Talk that featured a spectacular assistive technology Brain-Computer Interface (BCI) and Augmented Reality (AR) demonstration to help a friend living with severe motor disabilities, Christian Bayerlein, fly a drone over the audience.

== Early life ==
Conor Russomanno was born in Livingston, New Jersey, but grew up in Falls Church, Virginia. After attending Thomas Jefferson High School for Science and Technology, he was recruited to Columbia to play NCAA college football. After playing college football for a year, he quit and joined Columbia's rugby club, CURFC, serving as the club's president and was voted first-team all-Ivy fullback as a senior.

== Career ==
As an undergraduate at Columbia University, Russomanno studied civil engineering & engineering mechanics while teaching computer graphics and developing Unity-based virtual environments under NSF funding. He later studied brain-computer interfacing (BCI) as a Design & Technology MFA student at Parsons School of Design. After graduating from Parsons, he led two successful Kickstarter campaigns, raising close to $500,000, allowing him to develop OpenBCI.

Russomanno has also worked as adjunct faculty at Parsons School of Design and NYU's Interactive Telecommunication Program (ITP), where he has taught Creative Coding, Brain Hacking, Designing Consciousness, and a number of other courses. He now teaches a course titled "Neuromachina: Man & Machine" at NYU Tisch School of the Arts.

Russomanno served as a "Something In Residence" in the ITP program at NYU's Tisch School of the Arts.

== Speaking engagements and workshops ==
- "Brain-Computer Interfaces & Apparel" – Brooklyn Fashion + Design Accelerator (BF+DA) (Brooklyn, NY), February 21, 2017
- "Brain-Computer Interface" – NYU Interactive Telecommunications Program (ITP) (New York, NY), February 2, 2017
- "AR Human Computer Interfaces" (Panel) – AR in Action, MIT Media Lab (Cambridge, MA), January 17, 2017
- Guest Lecture for Topics in Computational Neuroscience and Neuroengineering: Brain-Computer Interfaces, Columbia University Biomedical Engineering (New York, NY), November 1, 2016
- "An Introduction to BCI" – Columbia University Neuroscience Society (New York, NY), October 24, 2016
- "Dawn of The Neurorevolution" – SuperHuman Summit 2016 (Vancouver, Canada), October 22, 2016
- "The Democratization of Neurotechnology" – NeuroTech NYC 2016 (New York, NY), June 8, 2016
- "An Introduction to BCI" – Xtech & Neurogaming Hackathon 2016 (San Francisco, CA), May 14, 2016
- "DIY Cyborgia" – BodyHacking Con 2016 (Austin, TX), February 20, 2016
- "Neural Interfaces for Makers and Biohackers" – MakerCon Bay Area (San Francisco, CA), May 12, 2015
- "Future of Augmented Reality Panel" – NeuroGaming 2015, (San Francisco, CA), May 8, 2015
- "The Digital Self: Interfacing the Body" – Eyebeam Studio (Brooklyn, NY), April 25, 2015
- "BCIs for the Masses" (panel) – IBT BrainTech 2015 (Tel Aviv, Israel), March 11, 2015
- The Startup Segment – FT Innovate America 2014 (New York, NY), December 12, 2014
- “Out of Your Mind: Rise of The Brain-Computer Interface” – Make Magazine (Vol. 41 Oct/Nov 2014)
- "Brain-Computer Interfaces & Serious Gaming" – Nordic Digital Business Summit 2014 (Helsinki, Finland), Sept. 4th, 2014
- "Future of Augmented Reality Panel" – NeuroGaming 2014, (San Francisco, CA), May 5, 2014
