= Education Reference Group =

School administration unit in Connecticut, USA

Connecticut school districts are grouped into Education Reference Groups (ERGs), also known as "District Reference Groups" (DRGs) based on the characteristics of their student's families. Districts in an ERG have similar median family incomes, percentages of families below the poverty level, percentages of single-parent families, percentage of families with a non-English home language, percentages of families in which one or both parents have a bachelor's degree, and percentages of families in white collar or managerial occupations. The number of students enrolled in the district is also considered.

ERGs range from A (most affluent) to I.

The Connecticut State Department of Education created the educational reference groups (ERGs) in 1989 as a research and performance measurement tool. ERGs are a classification system under which school districts are grouped together to allow legitimate education outcome comparisons among districts.

== See also ==
List of school districts in Connecticut#District Reference Groups.
