= Feel Train =

Worker-owned technology cooperative

Feel Train was a technology cooperative co-founded by Courtney Stanton and Darius Kazemi and based in Portland, Oregon. It closed at the end of 2019.

== Structure ==
Feel Train was a worker-owned cooperative. Stanton and Kazemi were its first two worker-owners, and the organization was chartered to allow a maximum of eight employees, each with equal salary, equal share in the company and equal firing power over others, including the founders.

== Projects ==
Feel Train projects included the Stay Woke Bot, a Twitter bot developed in collaboration with activists DeRay Mckesson and Samuel Sinyangwe, and Shortcut, an app developed with radio program This American Life to facilitate sharing audio clips across social media, similar to the way gifs allow video clips to be shared. Feel Train is also developing a Twitter bot based on the Obama Social Media Archive called Relive 44, which beginning in May 2017 will repost, eight years later, every tweet from President Barack Obama (whose first tweet came in May 2009.)
