= Scott Werndorfer =

American computer programmer

Scott Werndorfer (born August 1, 1980) is the co-founder and head developer of Cerulean Studios, a company responsible for creating Trillian, a popular instant messaging client.

Werndorfer is a native of Brookfield, Connecticut. He was a network security consultant at Integralis before founding Cerulean Studios. He did not complete college, but instead, used US$ 10,000 of his savings to start Cerulean Studios together with fellow computer programmer Kevin Kurtz. The two originally depended on donations from the freeware version of Trillian, which they first released on July 1, 2000.

As their product quickly garnered attention of the tech media, Werndorfer had become the spokesperson of his company, and he had been interviewed on several newspapers and magazines, and an appearance on TechTV. He was also the spokesperson when Trillian was blocked by AOL and Yahoo!.

In 2003 his company released a commercial version of Trillian. The earnings helped support the company and add more employees.

The offices of Cerulean Studios are located in Connecticut.

He was a speaker at the iX Conference in Singapore in June 2006.
