= Yext =

New York City technology company

Coordinates: 40°44′29″N 73°59′15″W

Yext, Inc.
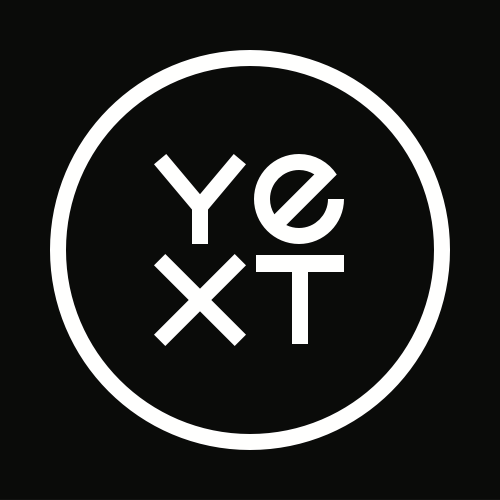
- Company type: Public
- Website type: Software
- Traded as: NYSE: YEXT; Russell 2000 Component
- Founded: November 28, 2006 (19 years ago)
- Headquarters: 61 Ninth Avenue, New York, New York
- Founders: Howard Lerman; Brent Metz; Brian Distelburger
- CEO: Michael Walrath
- Key people: Michael Walrath (CEO and Chairman); Darryl Bond (CFO)
- Industry: Internet
- Products: Listings, Search, Pages, Content, Reviews, Analytics, Chat
- Revenue: ▲US$354.7 million (FY 2021)
- Total equity: US$115.8 million
- Employees: 1,200 (2021)
- Website: yext.com
- Registration: Required
- Current status: Active

Yext is a New York-based enterprise agentic marketing platform. It enables brands to deliver consistent, accurate information to customers anywhere in the digital world from one central platform. Yext's platform is organizer around the Knowledge Graph, a structured, machine-readable repository of brand data.

The company was founded in 2006 by Howard Lerman, Brian Distelburger, and Brent Metz. Yext`s market capitalization was approximately $930 million at the end of January 2026.

Yext is headquartered in New York City and maintains worldwide office location: North America, Europe, and Asia, including offices in cities such as London, Berlin, Paris, Tokyo, and Shanghai.

== History ==
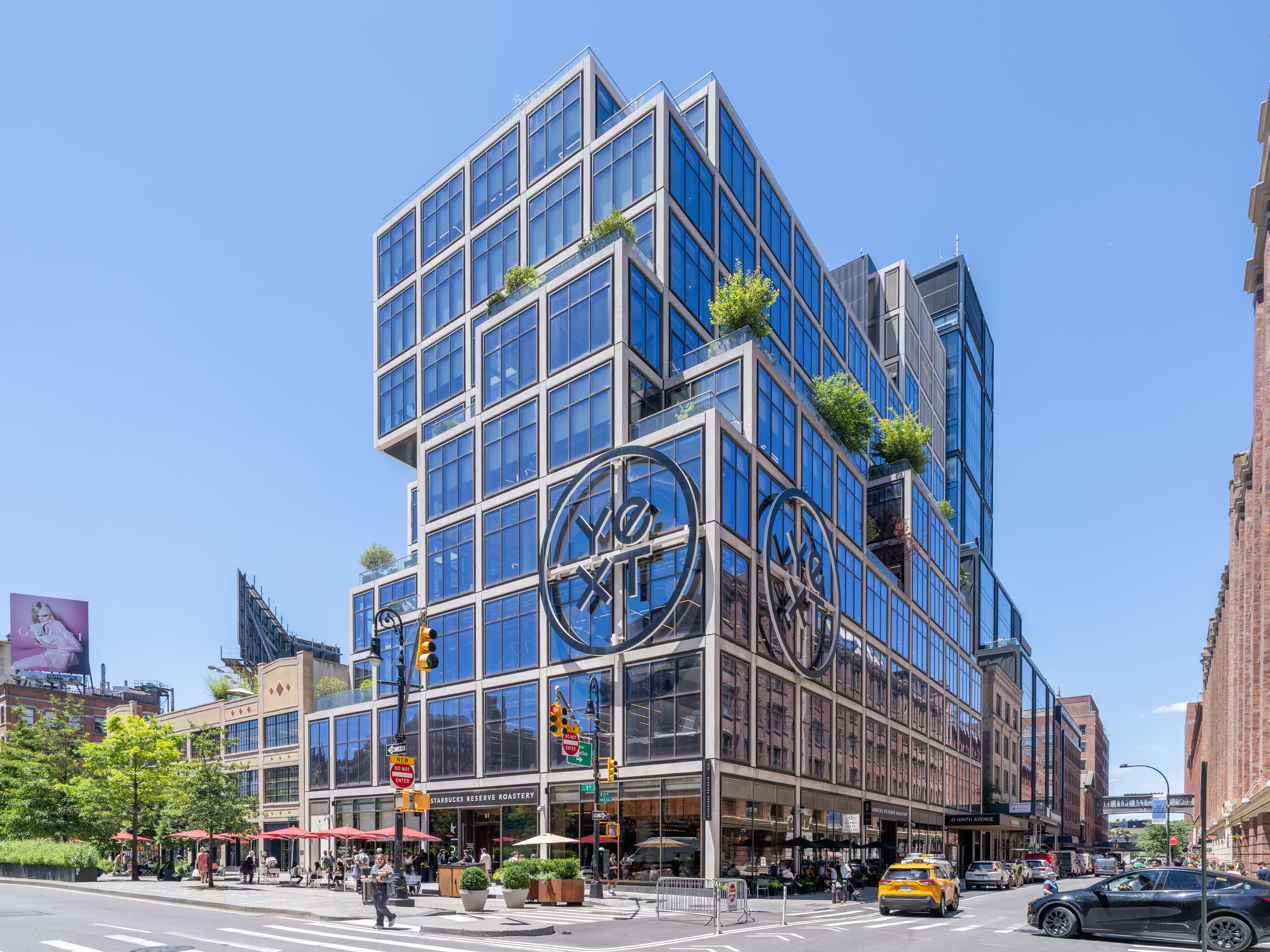
Headquarters in the Meatpacking District, Manhattan

Yext was founded in 2006 as a local advertising business. Its 2009 revenue was $20 million after it switched to generating customer leads and charging per lead.

In August 2012, the company sold its pay-per-call business to IAC's CityGrid Media in order to focus on listings. By that time, Yext had raised $65.8 million in funding and handled 950,000 updates for 50,000 businesses.

Investors included Sutter Hill Ventures, Institutional Venture Partners, and WGI investments. By 2016, the company had $89 million in revenue and had expanded its offices at One Madison Avenue to 95,000 square feet.

In 2016, the company was ranked #60 on the Deloitte Fast 500 North America list.

In 2017, Yext was listed on the New York Stock Exchange.

In 2019, Yext announced that it was moving its headquarters to 61 Ninth Ave in New York City, dubbed "The Yext Building". The distinctive building was designed by famed architect Rafael Viñoly. The move was originally planned for March 2020 but was delayed due to the onset of the COVID-19 Pandemic.

In March 2022, the company's founder Howard Lerman, announced that he was stepping down as CEO. He was succeeded as CEO by Michael Walrath, founder of Right Media, who had been the Chairman of the Board since 2011.

== Restructuring and corporate developments (2023–2026) ==
Yext cut its workforce by about 8% in January 2023 and by a further 12% in June 2024 as cost-reduction measures. In June 2024, it agreed to acquire Hearsay Systems for up to $220 million.

Yext reported fiscal Q1 2027 revenue of $107.9 million in June 2026, alongside a $140 million share buyback. Later that month, it opened its platform to external AI tools via API and MCP.

== Products ==
Scout, launched in 2025, is a visibility-intelligence tool that tracks brand and competitor performance across AI-driven and traditional search, providing location-level analysis. Action Center is an execution layer that allows brands to manage AI agents that act on Scout's recommendations, such as updating listings, responding to reviews, or publishing social content.

In May 2026, Yext acquired GoShine, an AI-search visibility optimization startup, for an undisclosed amount. Yext integrated GoShine's technology into its platform as "Brand Scout," expanding its capabilities for brand-level visibility optimization in AI-generated search results.

In June 2026, Yext opened its Knowledge Graph, Scout, and distribution infrastructure to external developers and enterprise workflows through an API and Model Context Protocol (MCP) interface, allowing the platform's data and intelligence to be accessed outside of Yext's own applications.

In September 2026, the company introduced Corvo AI, a free, text-message-based marketing assistant aimed at small business owners, built on the same underlying visibility and execution infrastructure as its enterprise products.

== Global presence ==
Yext is headquartered in New York City. The company operates five offices across Europe, in London, Berlin, Milan, Munich, and Paris. In 2022, Yext opened an office in Hyderabad, India.

The company's business presence extends across North America, Europe, and Asia, with additional U.S. locations reported in Washington, D.C., and Chicago.
