= Right Media =

American online advertising company

Right Media Inc.
- Type: Subsidiary
- Industry: Online advertising
- Founded: March 30, 2003; 23 years ago New York City, New York, U.S.
- Headquarters: New York City, New York, U.S.
- Key people: Mike Walrath (CEO, 2003), Brian O'Kelley (CTO, 2004), Christine Hunsicker (COO, 2004), Ramsey McGrory (VP, Sales, 2004), Ed Kozek (VP, Development, 2004), John Roberts (CFO, 2005), Bill Wise (President, 2006)
- Products: Ad serving, ad network
- Parent: Yahoo!
- Website: www.rightmedia.com

Right Media, Inc. was an online advertising company that operated the Right Media Exchange (RMX), a marketplace that enabled advertisers, publishers, and ad networks to trade digital media. Technology providers develop services for the Exchange via APIs.

== History ==
Right Media was founded, in March 2003, by Michael Walrath with brothers Noah and Jonah Goodhart as investors and board members. To fund the development of the initial ad serving, Right Media was a digital media buying service for AOL brands and Match.com. The initial ad serving solution, called Manage, was developed to optimize performance campaigns. Dynamic pricing (dCPM) was first launched in the summer of 2004 to change how display advertising campaigns were managed. At the time, all campaigns were flat CPM and inventory was optimized against performance goals. The new ad server named Yield Manager changed the model to optimize price on each ad call. Shortly after launching dCPM, other ad networks began to license Yield Manager, and the earliest version of the Right Media Exchange was launched in beta in Q3 of 2004.

The Right Media Exchange launched officially April 1, 2005, and scaled significantly in the following 18 months. On October 17, 2006, Yahoo! made a strategic investment in Right Media. On April 30, 2007, Yahoo! announced the acquisition of Right Media in a total transaction valued at approximately $680 million. After the Yahoo! acquisition announcement on April 29, 2007, Right Media was integrated with Yahoo!'s offerings to small businesses. Right Media's customers included Yahoo! (also an investor) and Fox Interactive Media. Yahoo! closed on the Right Media acquisition in July 2007. Former CTO Brian O'Kelley and former director of analytics Mike Nolet subsequently left at the close and co-founded AppNexus, in 2007.

Yahoo! placed Right Media under the management of the Yahoo Ad Network, which was responsible for driving ad sales revenue for Yahoo! Yahoo! subsequently announced and began to rebuild its entire ad stack. During this process, the open exchange strategy of Right Media was deprioritized, and founder Mike Walrath left the company. Subsequent leaders, Bill Wise and Ramsey McGrory also left in 2010 and 2011 respectively. While the open exchange strategy was not pursued, Yahoo! was able to increase its yield on its unsold inventory (known as Class 2) materially after the acquisition.

Yahoo shut down the Right Media Exchange in January 2015, citing its focus on premium and owned and operated inventory.
