= Kettle (disambiguation) =

A kettle is a vessel for heating water.

Kettle also may refer to:

- Kettle (surname)

== Places ==
- Kettle, Kentucky
- Kettle, West Virginia
- Kettle Creek (disambiguation)
- Kettle Falls, Washington
- Kettle Moraine, Wisconsin
- Kettle River (disambiguation)
- Kettle River, Minnesota
- Kettle Valley, British Columbia
- Kingskettle, Scotland

== Media ==
- Captain Kettle, fictional character in a series of novels by C. J. Cutcliffe Hyne
- Ma and Pa Kettle, fictional characters in the 1945 novel The Egg and I by Betty MacDonald and in ten feature films between 1947 and 1957

== Other uses ==
- Kettle (birds), a flock in flight
- Kettle (landform), remnant body of water
- Kettle corn, a type of popcorn
- Kettle Chips, a brand of potato chips (crisps)
- Kettle drum
- Kettle Foods, American food manufacturer
- Kettle hat
- Kettle logic
- Kettle War
- Kettle (military term), a Soviet military term for encirclement
- Kettling, a crowd control tactic
- Kettle Restaurants
- Kettle lead, a type of electrical power cord
- Cauldron
- Suzuki GT750, a motorcycle known informally as the "Kettle"

== See also ==
- Kettles (disambiguation)
