= Hawk Mountain (disambiguation) =

Hawk Mountain may refer to:

- Hawk Mountain, mountain in Pennsylvania
- Hawk Mountain Ranger School, a Civil Air Patrol search and rescue training activity
- Hawk Mountain (Alberta), a mountain in Alberta
- Hawk Mountain Sanctuary, bird of prey refuge in Pennsylvania
