= Maurice Broun =

American ornithologist and botanist

- Born: August 27, 1906; New York City, U.S.
- Died: October 2, 1979 (aged 73); Lehigh Valley Hospital–Cedar Crest, Allentown, Pennsylvania, U.S.
- Known for: Hawks Aloft: The Story of Hawk Mountain (1949)
- Scientific career
- Fields: ornithology; botany; conservation
- Author abbrev. (botany): M.Broun

Maurice Broun (August 27, 1906 – October 2, 1979) was an American ornithologist, botanist, naturalist, conservationist, and author.

== Early life and education ==
He was born in New York City to parents who immigrated from Romania. Both of his parents died from tuberculosis; his mother died when he was two weeks old, and his father died when he was two years old. He lived in a New York City orphanage until he was about six years old when he was taken in by a Catholic family. The mother became ill, however, and the foster father returned Maurice to the orphanage.

When he was ten years old, a Jewish family became his foster family, and the family moved to Boston. At age fourteen, he became interested in bird-watching in Boston Public Garden. He ran away from his foster family when he was fifteen years old, and supported himself for the rest of his life. He attended The English High School in Boston, where he rented a room and earned a living by menial jobs.

== Career ==
=== Author and editor ===
While still a high school student, he published a booklet on birds seen in Boston Public Garden. For about two years he was a bellhop at Boston's Women's City Club. When he graduated from high school, a lady whom he met while bird-watching helped him find work as an assistant to Edward Howe Forbush and John Birchard May, who were completing Forbush's Birds of Massachusetts and other New England States, which were published in three volumes between 1923 and 1929.

In 1929, after three years of work on the third volume of Forbush's book, Broun went to work creating the Pleasant Valley Bird Sanctuary. From 1929 to 1932, he cut six miles of trails and built a nature museum.

One of the nation's outstanding ornithologists with an enviable knowledge of botany, Broun was associated with the Pleasant Valley Sanctuary in Lenox, Massachusetts, with the Austin Ornithological Research Station in Cape Cod, where he banded over 40,000 birds, and was nature supervisor for nine years at the Aven Mt. Club at Long Trail Lodge, Rutland County, Vermont, where he established the Trail Side Museum. He authored Index to Northern Ferns, which has become the outstanding guide to American ferns.

While he was at Cape Cod, he met Irma Knowles Penniman (1908–1997), an ornithologist and conservationist, and married her on January 15, 1934.

=== Hawk Mountain Sancturary ===
In 1934, the wealthy socialite, bird-watching enthusiast, and conservationist Rosalie Edge leased with an option to buy 1,400 acres (5.7 km^{2}) to establish Hawk Mountain Sanctuary and hired Maurice and Irma Broun as game wardens to exclude hunters. The land, located near Orwigsburg, Pennsylvania, was purchased.

With the exception of three years from 1942 to 1945, when he was a photographer with the Seabees in the South Pacific during World War II, Broun worked as a curator of Hawk Mountain Sanctuary from 1934 until his retirement in 1966. Maurice and Irma worked as a husband and wife team at the Sanctuary until 1966, and then moved to a farm one ridge to the west of Hawk Mountain in East Brunswick Township, Pennsylvania.

== Death ==
Broun died of cancer on October 2, 1979, at Lehigh Valley Hospital–Cedar Crest in Allentown, Pennsylvania.

== See also ==
- Edward Penniman House and Barn
