= Kettles =

Kettles or Kettle's may refer to:

== Places ==
- The Kettles, a chain of four small alpine glacial lakes in Custer County, Idaho
- Hell Kettles, a spring-fed body of water in County Durham, England
- Kettles-de-Berry Ecological Reserve, ecological reserve in Quebec, Canada

== Fiction ==
- The Kettles; See Ma and Pa Kettle
  - The Kettles in the Ozarks, a 1956 American comedy film
  - The Kettles on Old MacDonald's Farm, a 1957 American comedy film

== Other ==
- Charles Kettles (1930–2019), United States military officer and recipient of the Medal of Honor
- Kettle's Yard, art gallery and house in Cambridge, England
- Kettle Foods, Oregon-based snack manufacturer
- Kettles (Australian brand), snack foods made by Snack Brands Australia
- Two Kettles, a subdivision of the Lakota Sioux tribe

== See also ==
- Kettle (disambiguation)
