= Pough =

Pough is a surname. Notable people with the surname include:

- Ernie Pough (born 1952), American football player
- James Edward Pough (1948–1990), American mass murderer
- Oliver Pough, American football player and coach
- Richard Pough (1904–2003), American conservationist
