= Kettle (surname) =

Kettle is a surname. Notable people bearing the name include:

- Tilly Kettle (1735–1786), English painter
- Rupert Alfred Kettle (1817–1894), British judge
- Charles Kettle (1821–1862), New Zealand surveyor
- Andrew Kettle (1833–1916), Irish politician
- Frederick Kettle (1875–1951), English football player
- Tom Kettle (1880–1916), Irish writer and politician
- Rupert Kettle (cricketer) (1915–1985), English cricketer for Assam
- Digger Kettle (1922–1999), British football player
- Michael Kettle (born 1944), English cricketer
- Martin Kettle (born 1949), British journalist
- Brian Kettle (born 1956), English football player
- Alice Kettle (born 1961), English textile artist
- Stephen Kettle (born 1966), British sculptor
- D. L. Lang (née Diana Kettle, born 1983), American poet
- Nicholas D. Kettle (born 1990), American politician
