= Hawk Mountain Council =

Scouting America council near Reading

- Owner: Scouting America
- Headquarters: Reading, Pennsylvania, U.S.
- Location: Berks County, Schuylkill County, and part of Carbon County
- Country: United States
- Founded: 1970
- Membership: 4,000 (2025)
- Scout Executive & CEO: Andrew J. Nam
- Website hmc-bsa.org

The Hawk Mountain Council is a Scouting America service council serving youth in Berks, Schuylkill, and Carbon counties in Pennsylvania. The council is headquartered in Reading, Pennsylvania.

The Council was formed in 1970 with the merger of the Appalachian Trail and Daniel Boone councils.

== Hawk Mountain Scout Reservation ==
Hawk Mountain Scout Reservation (HMSR) is the camp owned and operated by Hawk Mountain Council. It is located near Summit Station, Pennsylvania on Blue Mountain Road. The reservation consists of Camp Meade for Scouts BSA and Camp DuPortail for Cub Scouts. The camp is open for tent and cabin camping year-round.

The property has 635 acres (257 ha) of forest and a man-made lake, known as Lake Nalaheman. The camp also offers two swimming pools, a COPE (Challenging Outdoor Personal Experience) Course, a climbing tower, and a confidence-building course for Cub Scouts. HMSR also maintains a shooting sports program in which participants are taught the safe and responsible use of firearms and archery; facilities include ranges for .22 caliber rifles and archery, as well as shotgun trap shooting, an action archery course, and sporting arrows. The Northeast Region's National Camp School is often held at the camp in early summer for one week.

== Order of the Arrow ==
Kittatinny Lodge 5 is the Order of the Arrow lodge that serves the council. It was formed from the lodges of Appalachian Trail Council (Memeu 125) and Daniel Boone Council (Mindi 5) when the two councils merged in the 1970s.

== See also ==
- Hawk Mountain Ranger School
- Hawk Mountain Sanctuary
- Scouting in Pennsylvania
