= Schaumboch's Tavern =

- U.S. National Register of Historic Places
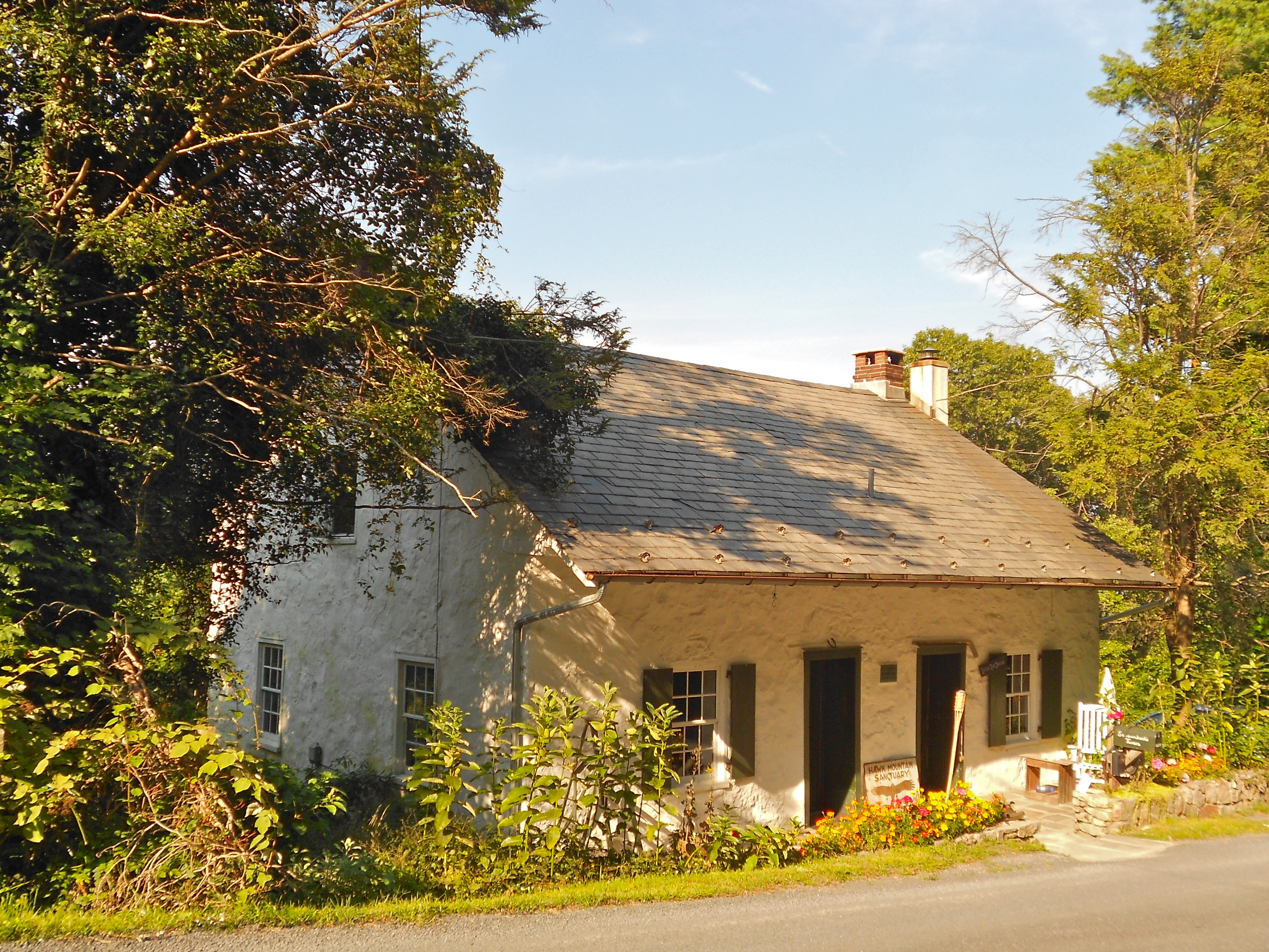

- Location within Pennsylvania Location within the United States
- Location: Northwest of Hamburg on Hawk Mountain Road, Albany Township, Pennsylvania
- Coordinates: 40°38′0″N 75°58′52″W
- Area: 1.3 acres (0.53 ha)
- Built: c. 1793
- Built by: Gerhardt, Jacob
- NRHP reference No.: 79002166
- Added to NRHP: November 20, 1979

Schaumboch's Tavern is an historic inn and tavern building in the Hawk Mountain Sanctuary at Albany Township, Berks County, Pennsylvania, United States.

It was added to the National Register of Historic Places in 1979.

== History and architectural features ==
Built circa 1793, this historic structure is a one-and-one-half-story, rectangular, stucco-coated, sandstone building that has a medium gable roof with a shed dormer on the rear elevation. It was once owned by Matthias Schaumboch, who is alleged to have murdered at least eleven traveling salesman and hucksters. This property was acquired as part of the Hawk Mountain Sanctuary in 1938, and is used to house sanctuary personnel.

== Gallery ==
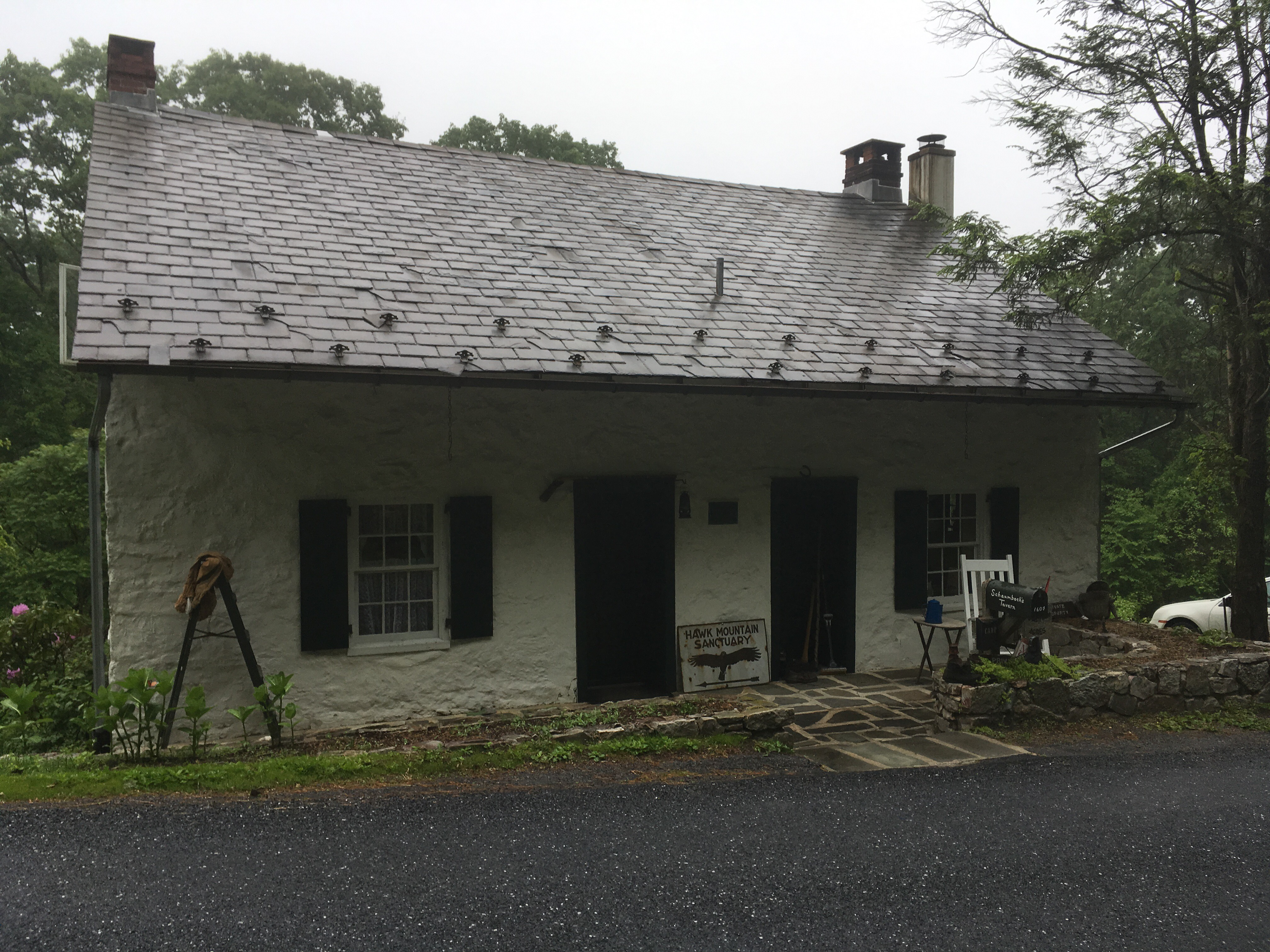
Schaumboch's Tavern
