= Hawk Mountain Sanctuary =

Wild bird sanctuary in Pennsylvania, US

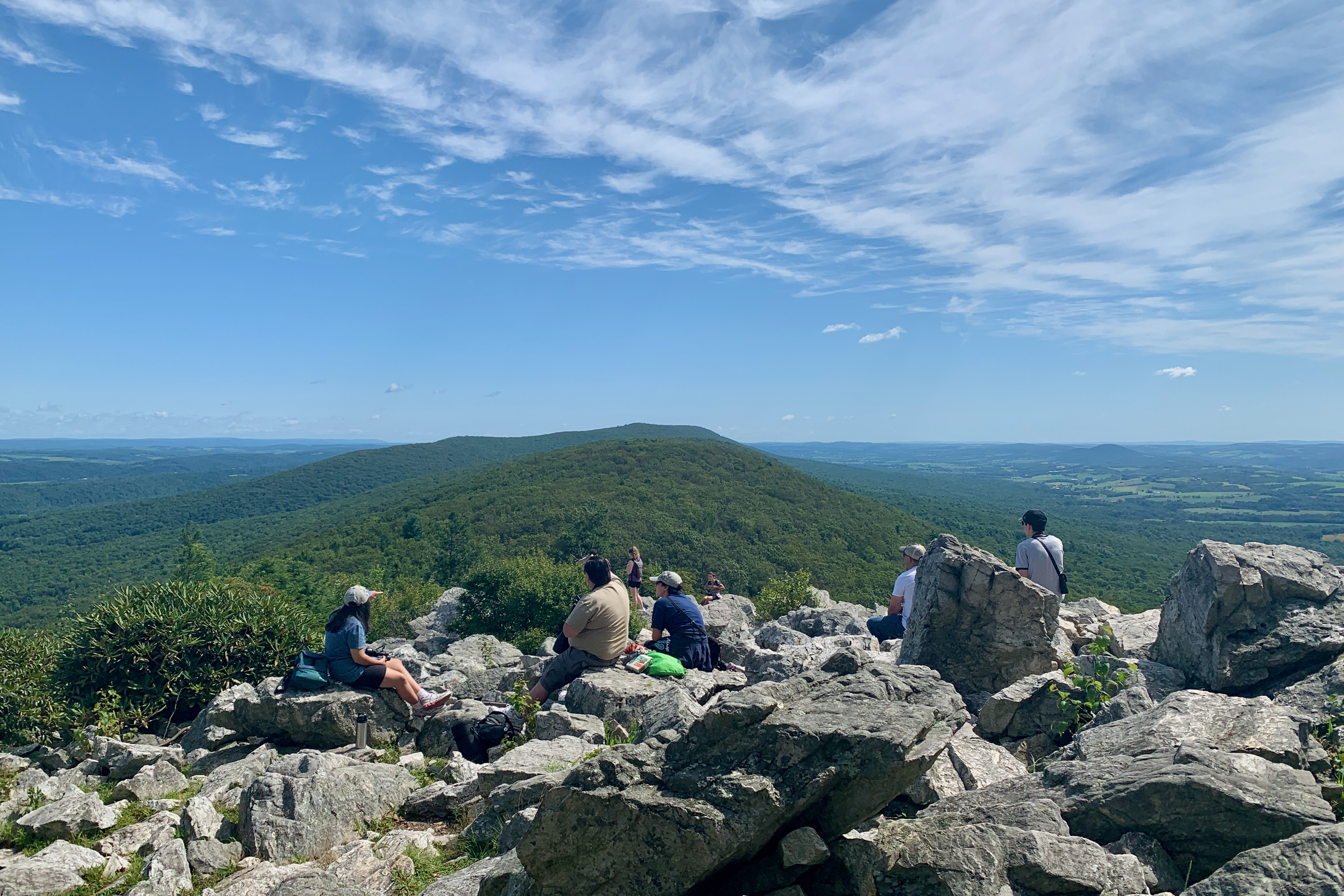
- Birdwatching at the North Lookout

- Location within Pennsylvania
- Location: Berks and Schuylkill counties, Pennsylvania, U.S.
- Nearest city: Orwigsburg, Pennsylvania
- Coordinates: 40°38′27″N 75°59′32″W
- Area: 2,600 acres (1,100 ha; 11 km^{2})
- Established: 1934
- Visitors: 60,000 (in 2008)
- Governing body: Hawk Mountain Sanctuary Association
- Website: www.hawkmountain.org

U.S. National Natural Landmark
- Designated: 1965

Pennsylvania Historical Marker
- Designated: September 14, 2019
- Location: Hawk Mountain Road, at path to North Lookout

Hawk Mountain Sanctuary is a wild bird sanctuary in Albany Township and East Brunswick Township, located along the Appalachian flyway in eastern Pennsylvania. The sanctuary is a prime location for the viewing of kettling and migrating raptors, known as hawkwatching, with an average of 20,000 hawks, eagles and falcons passing the lookouts during the late summer and fall every year.

The birds are identified and counted by staff and volunteers to produce annual counts of migrating raptors that represent the world's longest record of raptor populations. These counts have provided conservationists with valuable information on changes in raptor numbers in North America.

The property was listed on the National Register of Historic Places in 2022.

== Setting ==
The sanctuary is located on a ridge of Hawk Mountain, one of the Blue Mountain chain. The Visitor Center houses a shop and facilities with parking nearby. A habitat garden next to it is home to native plants that are protected by a deer fence. The 1 mile (1.6 km) Lookout Trail runs from the Visitor Center to a number of raptor viewing sites along the ridge, the most popular being the close by South Lookout (elevation 1,300 feet [400 m]) and the North Lookout (elevation 1,521 feet [464 m]) with a 200 degree panoramic view that extends to 70 miles (110 km). Nine trails of varying difficulty are available to hikers and linked to the Appalachian Trail.

Located in the sanctuary is Schaumboch's Tavern, listed on the National Register of Historic Places in 1979.

== History ==
The area was a popular site for shooting hawks, either for sport or to prevent depredations on domestic fowl or game birds. In 1934, Rosalie Edge leased 1,400 acres (570 ha) of property on Hawk Mountain and hired wardens to keep the hunters away. The wardens were Maurice Broun and his wife Irma Broun, bird enthusiasts and conservationists from New England. Almost immediately, there was a noticeable recovery in the raptor population. In 1938, the Hawk Mountain Sanctuary Association was incorporated as a non-profit organization in Pennsylvania, and Edge purchased the property and deeded it to the association in perpetuity.

In 1965, the sanctuary was designated a National Natural Landmark, and in 2022 it was listed on the National Register of Historic Places.

Famous visitors to the sanctuary include Rachel Carson.

Through Sarkis Acopian's philanthropy, the sanctuary was able to open the Acopian Center for Conservation Learning in 2001, where students come from all over the world to participate in work-study internships, learning about ornithology, environmental science, biology, and related fields.

== Migration timetable ==
The peak migration time at Hawk Mountain Sanctuary varies among the various species. Time periods given here are those when the raptor has historically been counted on half or more days. Species of raptor are listed in chronological order of the start of their period of likely observation.

- Broad-winged hawk: late August to late September
- American kestrel: late August to early October
- Osprey: late August to early October
- Bald eagle: early September
- Northern harrier: early September to early November
- Sharp-shinned hawk: early September to early November
- Red-tailed hawk: early September to early December
- Cooper's hawk: late September to late October
- Merlin: early October
- Peregrine falcon: early October
- Red-shouldered hawk: early October to early November
- Golden eagle: early November
- Rough-legged hawk: early November to early December
- American goshawk: late November

== Gallery ==
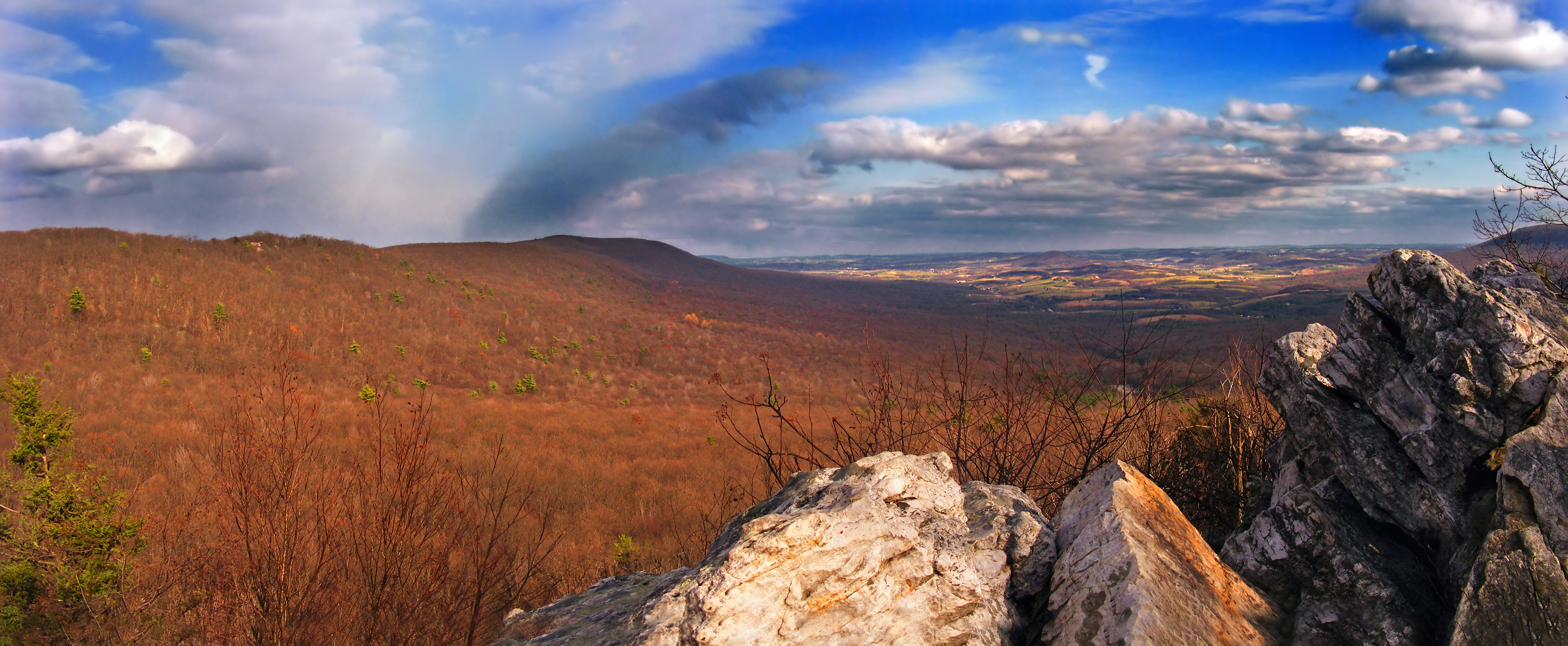

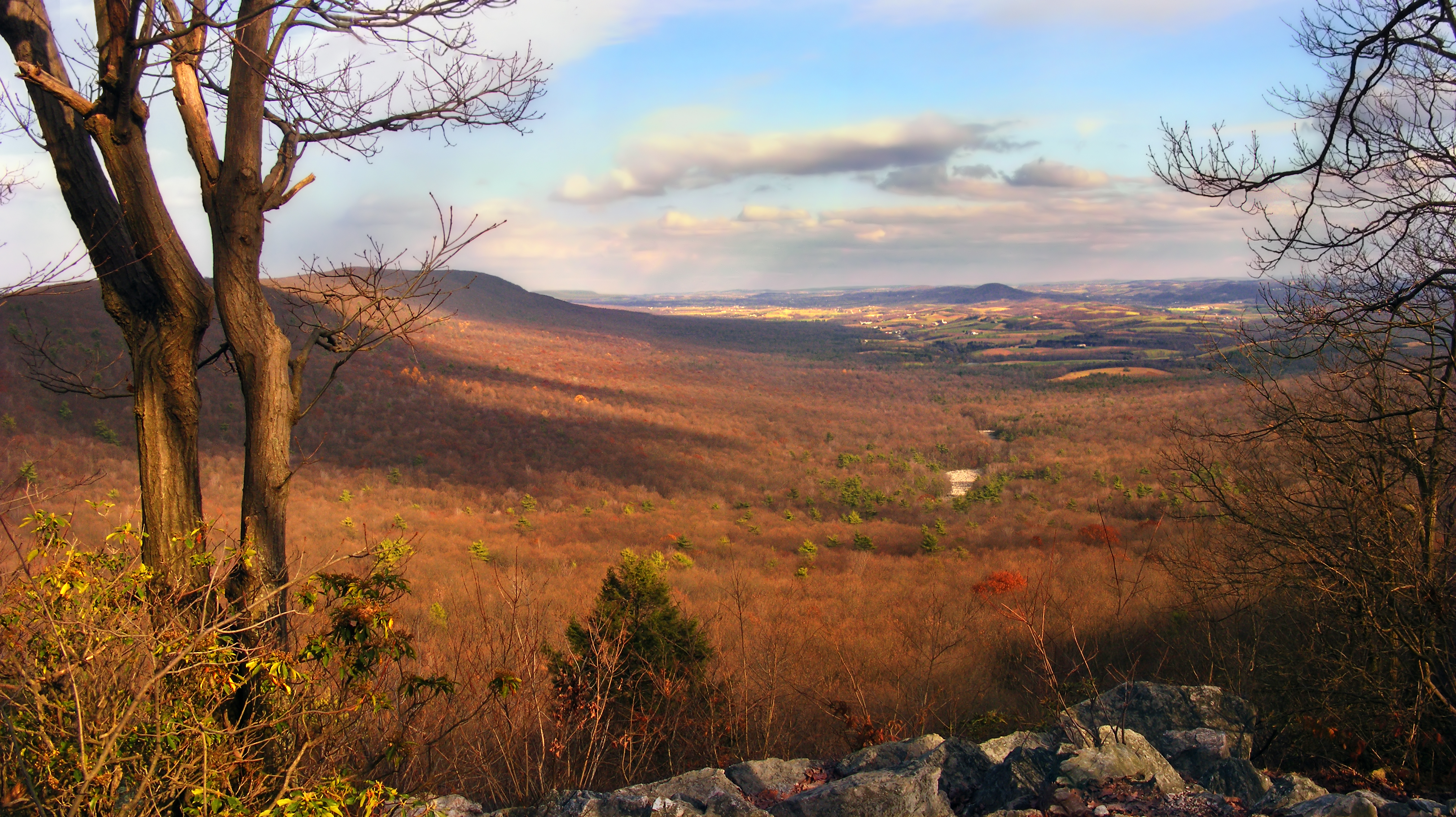

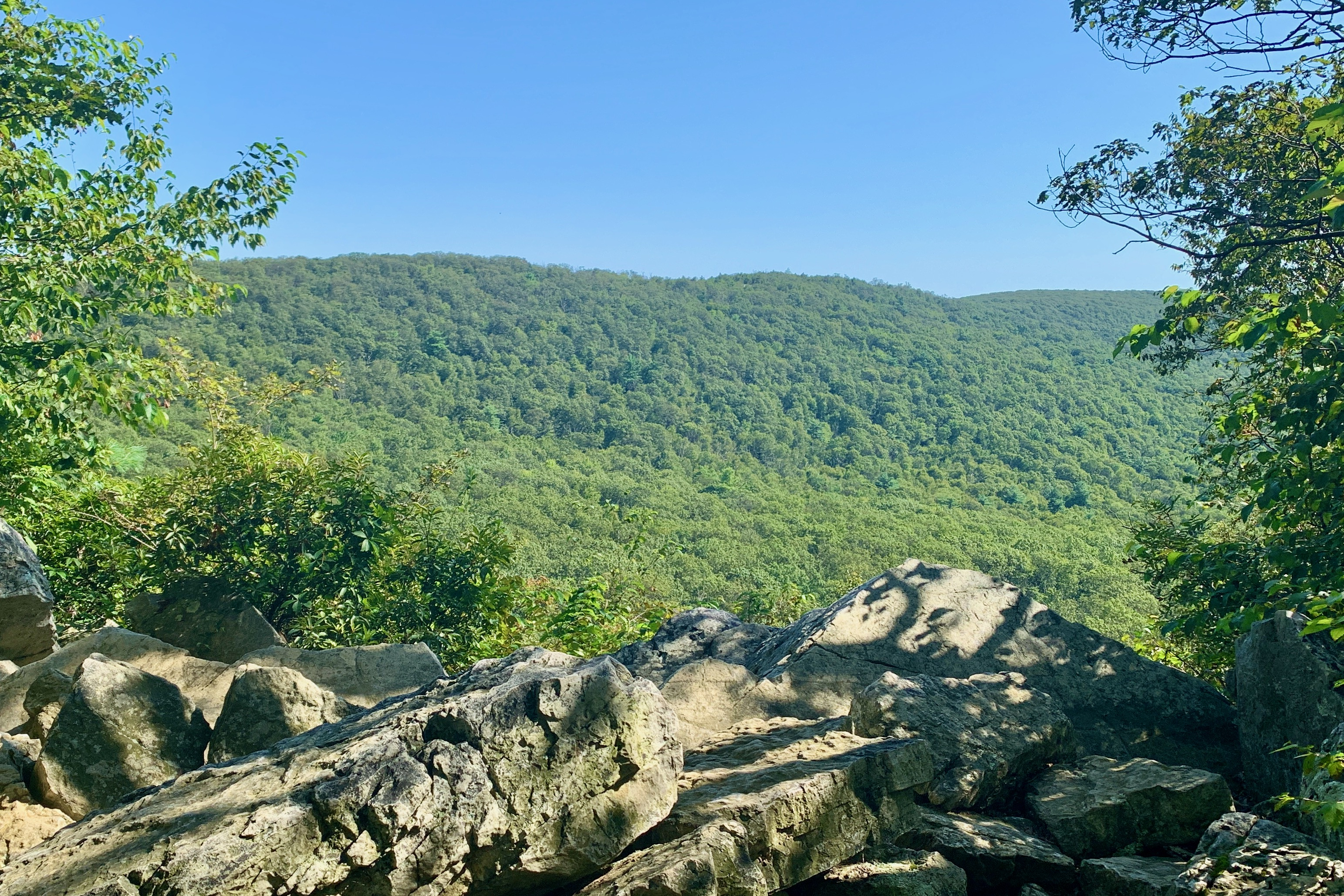
Overlook view of Hawk Mountain

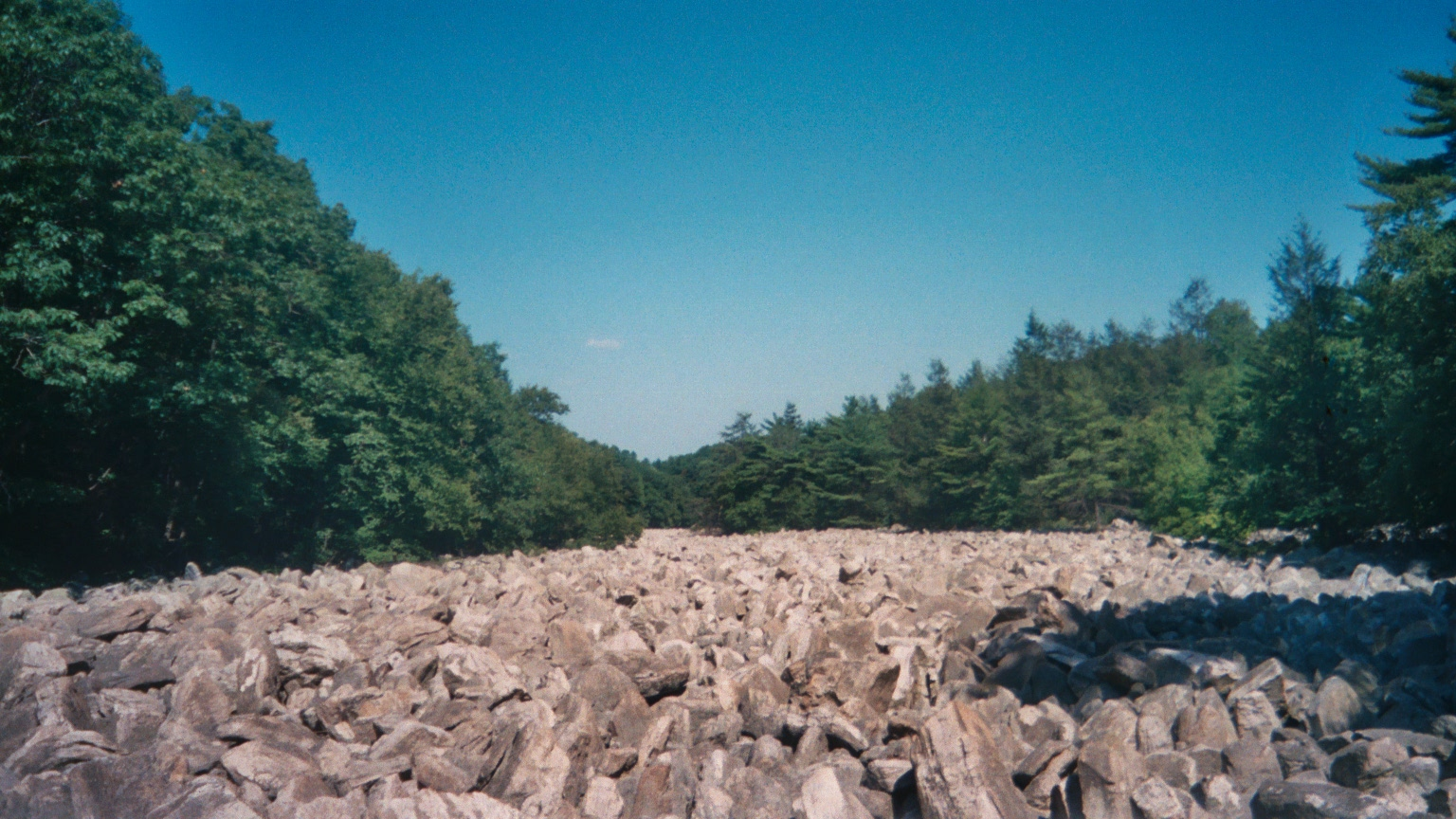
River of rocks

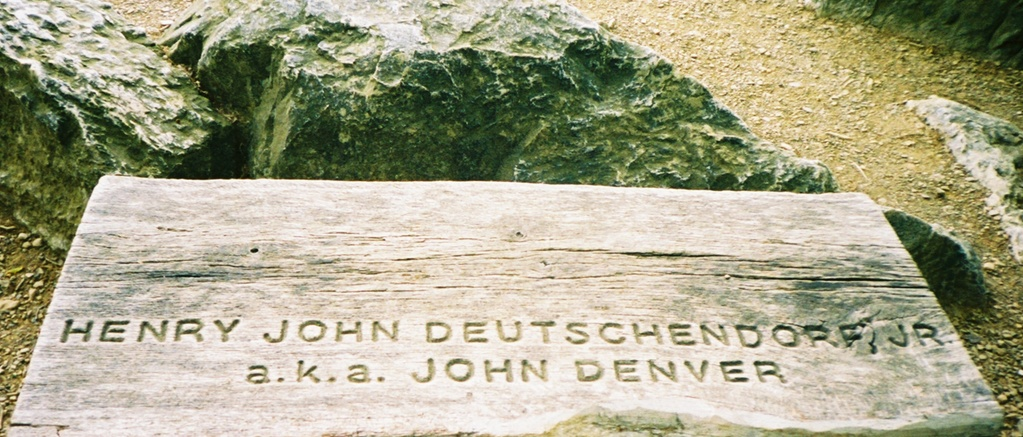
John Denver Bench at South Lookout
