= Kettle River =

Kettle River may refer to a location in North America:

== Rivers ==
- Kettle River (Columbia River) in British Columbia and Washington
- Kettle River (St. Croix River), a tributary of the St. Croix River in east-central Minnesota
- Kettle River (Blueberry River), a tributary of the Blueberry River in central Minnesota

== Ranges ==
- Kettle River Range, is the southernmost range of the Monashee Mountains

== Communities ==
- Kettle River, Minnesota

== See also ==
- West Kettle River
- Kettle (disambiguation)
