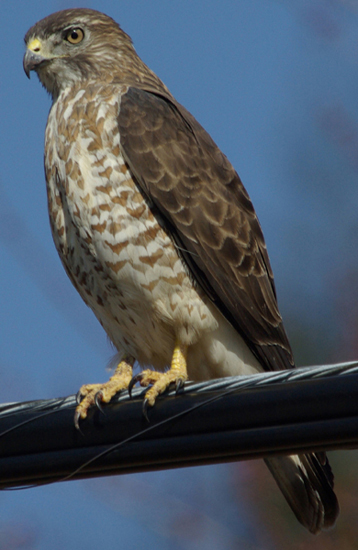

Conservation status
- Least Concern (IUCN 3.1)

Scientific classification
- Kingdom: Animalia
- Phylum: Chordata
- Class: Aves
- Order: Accipitriformes
- Family: Accipitridae
- Genus: Buteo
- Species: B. platypterus

Binomial name
- Buteo platypterus (Vieillot, 1823)
- Global map of eBird reports of this species Year-Round Range Summer Range Winter Range Migration

= Broad-winged hawk =

Species of bird

The broad-winged hawk (Buteo platypterus) is a medium-sized hawk of the genus Buteo. During the summer, some subspecies are distributed over eastern North America, as far west as British Columbia and Texas; they then migrate south to winter in the Neotropics from Mexico south to southern Brazil. Other subspecies are all-year residents on Caribbean islands. As in most raptors, females are slightly larger than males. Broad-winged hawks' wings are relatively short and broad with a tapered, somewhat pointed appearance. The two types of coloration are a dark morph with fewer white areas and a light morph that is more pale overall. Although the broad-winged hawk's overall population is increasing, populations are declining in some parts of its breeding range because of forest fragmentation.

== Description ==
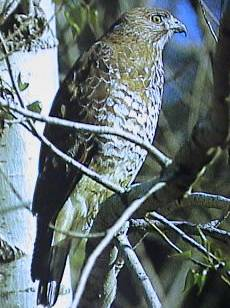
Broad-winged hawk at Isle Royale National Park

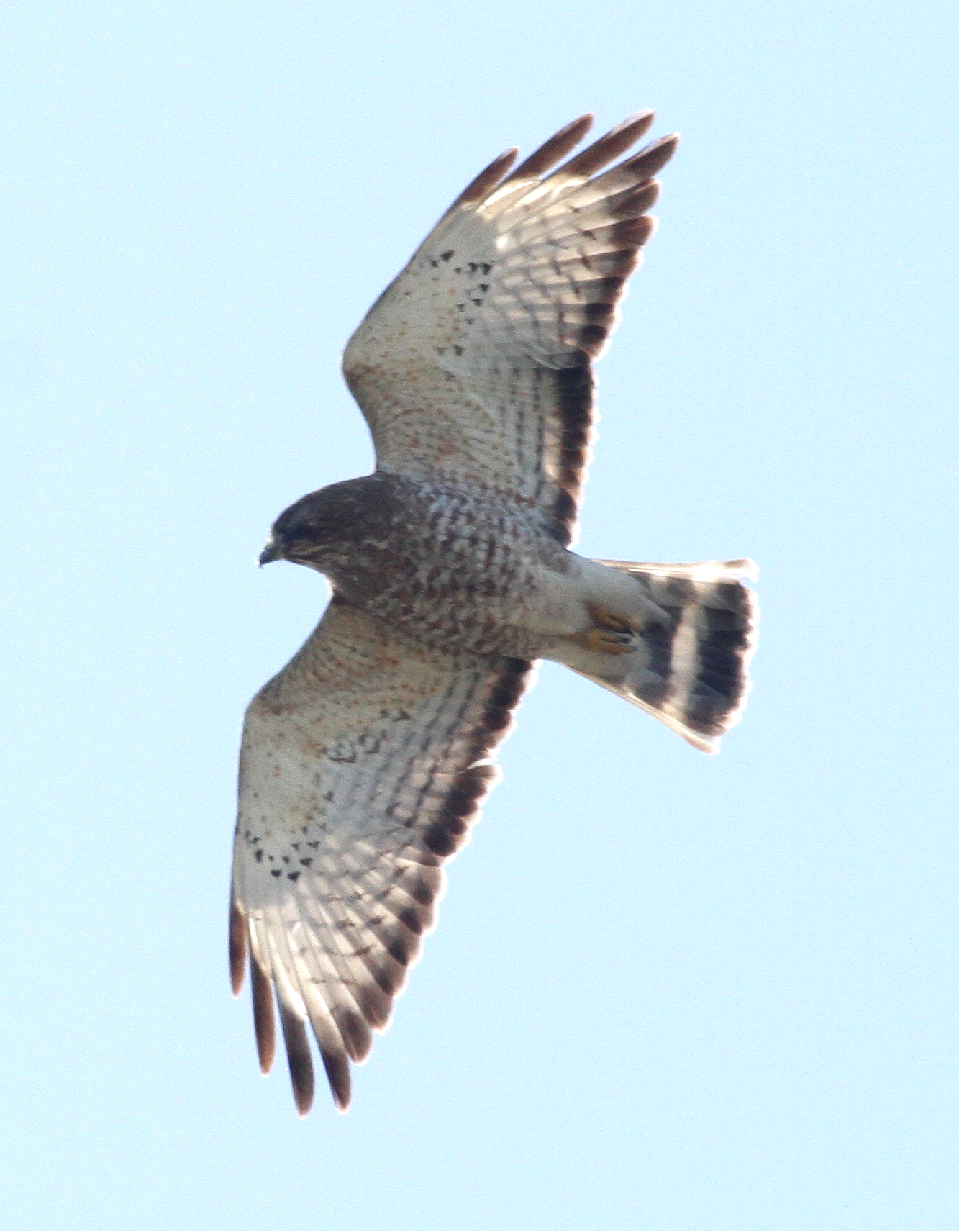
Sheepshead Sanctuary South Padre Island - Texas

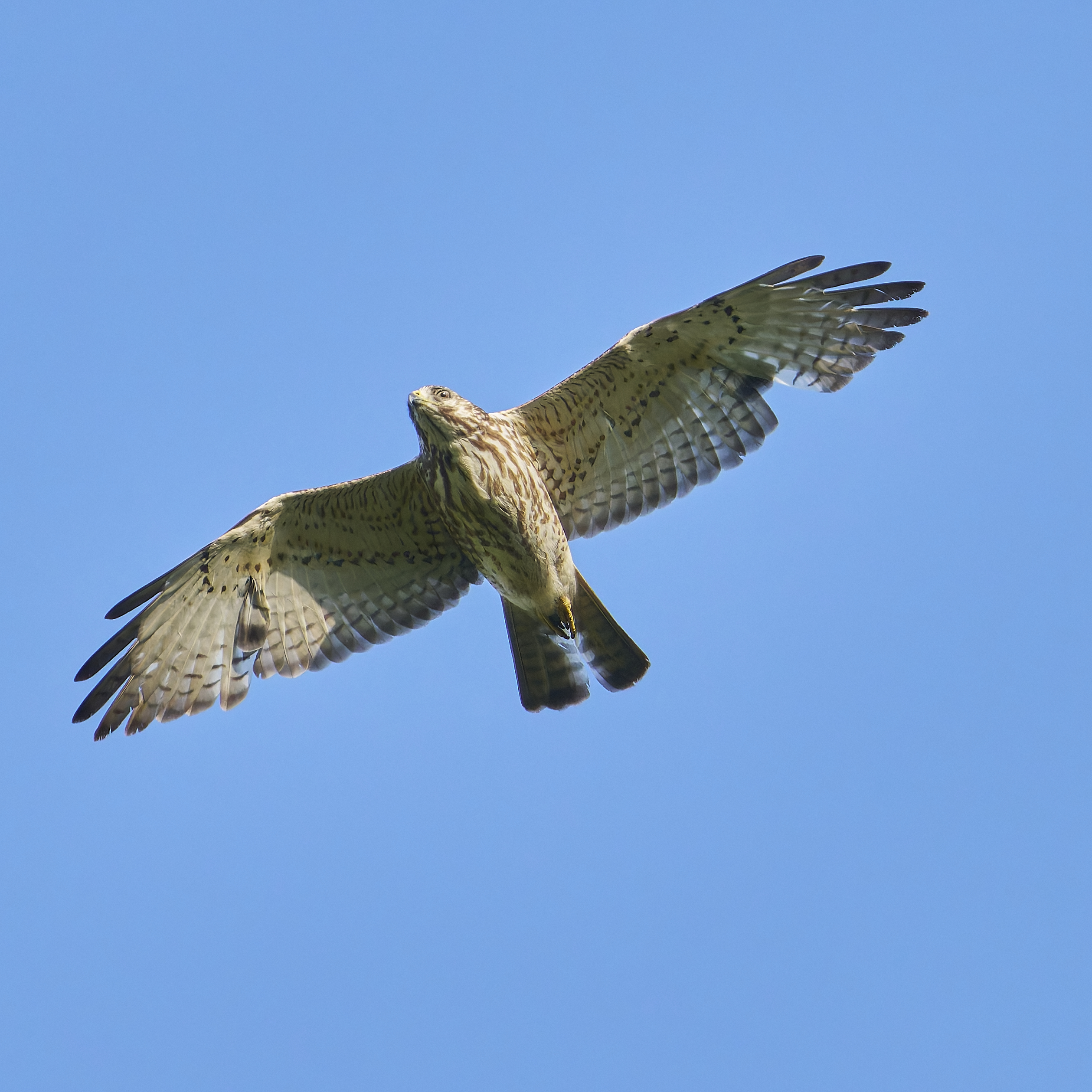
Molting feather pattern, only visible in May/June

The broad-winged hawk is a relatively small Buteo, with a body size from 32 to 44 cm (13 to 17 in) in length and weighing 265 to 560 g (9.3 to 19.8 oz). The tail is relatively short, measuring 14.5–19.0 cm (5.7–7.5 in) in length. The tarsus measures from 5.6 to 6.6 cm (2.2 to 2.6 in). As in most raptors, females are slightly larger than males. Broad-winged hawks have relatively short and broad wings, pointed at the end, which have a tapered appearance unique to the species. The wingspan can range from 74 to 100 cm (29 to 39 in), with the extended wing bone (standard measurement) measuring 22.7–30 cm (8.9–11.8 in).

An adult's body is a dark brown with a white belly and chest containing horizontal barring. Its tail can be a dark grey-black with white lines along the middle, base, and tip. The young hawks have a slightly different coloring with more white and longitudinal barring instead of horizontal barring. The two types of coloration are a dark morph with fewer white areas and a light morph that is more pale overall. The light morph of this bird is most likely to be confused with the red-shouldered hawk, which has a longer, more heavily barred tail and wings with a solid rufous color in the adult, which are usually distinctive. Rare dark morphs are a darker brown on both upperparts and underparts. Dark-morph short-tailed hawks are similar, but are whitish under the tail with a single subterminal band.

== Taxonomy ==
This species, Buteo platypterus, is in the family Accipitridae, which is placed in the order Falconiformes (or Accipitriformes). Currently, the species is split into six subspecies; each is named for its distribution,

- B. p. platypterus – (Vieillot, 1823): The northern broad-winged hawk occurs throughout much of continental eastern North America.
- B. p. brunnescens – Danforth & Smyth, 1935: The Puerto Rican broad-winged hawk occurs in the karst forests of Puerto Rico.
- B. p. cubanensis – Burns, 1911: The Cuban broad-winged hawk occurs on Cuba.
- B. p. insulicola – Riley, 1908: The Antigua broad-winged hawk occurs on Antigua.
- B. p. rivierei – Verrill, AH, 1905: The Dominican broad-winged hawk occurs on Dominica, Martinique, and St. Lucia.
- B. p. antillarum – Clark, AH, 1905: The Antillean broad-winged hawk occurs in the Lesser Antilles from Saint Vincent and Grenada to Tobago, excluding Antigua.

== Habitat and distribution ==
Broad-winged hawks have a wide range in North America and South America, from southern Canada to southern Brazil. Their breeding range is in the northern and eastern parts of North America, and some migrate in the winter to Florida, southern Mexico, and northern South America. Five subspecies are endemic to the Caribbean and do not migrate. Those subspecies that do migrate fly in flocks of more than 40 up to several thousand at heights from 550 to 1,300 m (1,800 to 4,270 ft). They soar using thermals to carry them through their journey of 3,000–6,000 km (1,900–3,700 mi). Fall migration lasts for 70 days as birds migrate about 100 km (62 mi) per day from North America, through Central America to South America without crossing salt water. The enormous flocks of soaring broad-winged hawks are termed kettles and are characteristic of many hawk migration spectacles in North America, such as at Hawk Cliff in Ontario, Hawk Ridge in Minnesota, Hawk Mountain in Pennsylvania, and the River of Raptors in Veracruz.

Broad-winged hawks stay in areas up to an elevation around 2,000 m (6,600 ft). They breed in deciduous forests good for nesting and forage primarily in wetlands and meadows. While some birds have acclimatized themselves to living near humans, even those birds avoid human settlements and interactions. In the winter, the migrating subspecies of the hawks seek out similar conditions to their overwintering home, so they settle in deciduous and mixed forests.

Although it is declining in some areas because of forest fragmentation, its overall population is increasing and is assessed as least concern on the IUCN Red List.

== Behavior ==
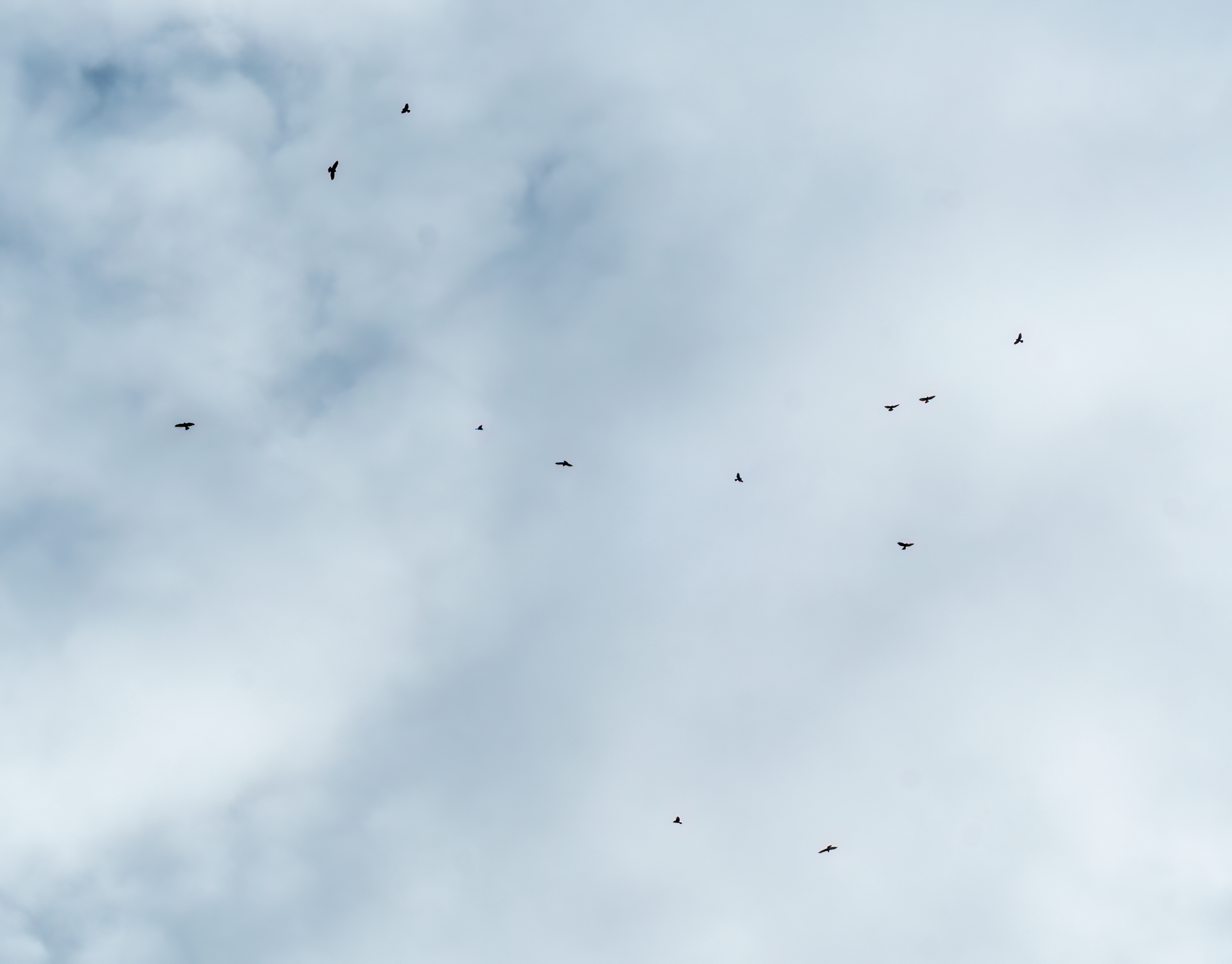
A kettle of broad-winged hawks over New York

=== Vocalization ===
These hawks use vocalizations for communication with their mates and offspring, and in territorial displays towards intruders such as red-tailed hawks or other threatening animals. Their call sounds like a very high-pitched kee-ee, almost like a whistle. Fledglings learn to emit the call by the time they are one month old. When confronted with a threat, broad-winged hawks emit an alarm call consisting of stuttered and squealing whistles.

=== Diet ===
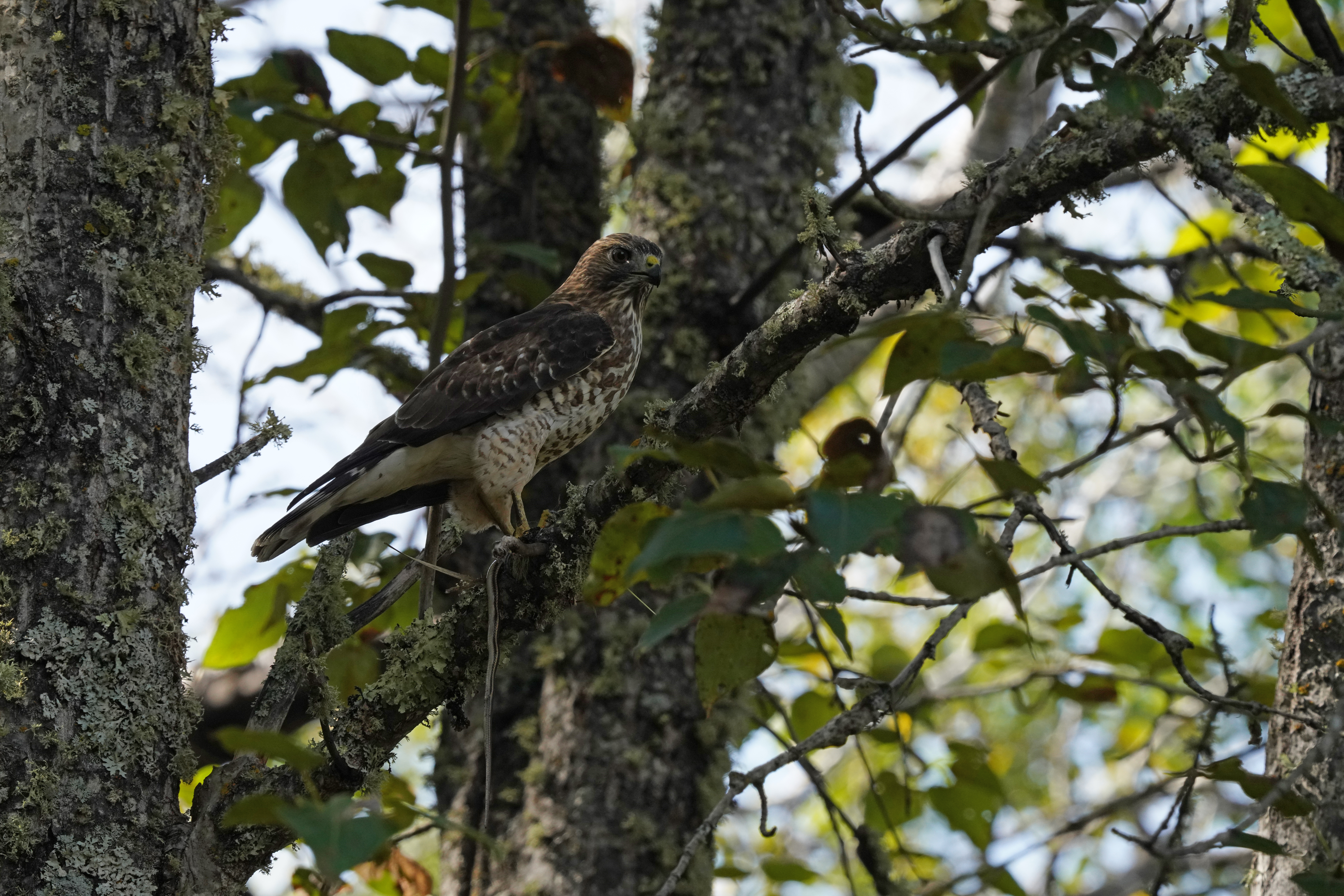
Broad-winged hawk with a snake at Pine Island State Forest, Minnesota

Broad-winged hawks are carnivores. The types of food they eat depends on the time of year and consists of whichever insects, amphibians, reptiles, mammals (ranging from mice to small rabbits), and birds (up to the size of grouse and New World quails) are available at any given time. During the summer or nesting season the parents and ultimately their chicks eat small animals such as chipmunks, shrews, and voles, frogs, lizards, and sometimes even other nesting birds like cardinals, as well as sick or injured birds. In the winter, they have been observed feeding on insects (such as grasshoppers, dragonflies, and saturniid moth caterpillars), frogs, lizards, snakes, crabs, earthworms, and small mammals. To catch their prey, broad-winged hawks watch from low branches, hiding in the foliage, until a target is spotted. From their roost they do a short, fast glide to capture the prey. They give special attention to preparing their food for consumption, skinning frogs and snakes and plucking prey birds' feathers. Most small mammals, though, are eaten whole. They rarely drink water and are able to survive solely with the water present in their prey.

=== Reproduction ===
These birds have only one mate during the breeding season, possibly because the male also helps a small amount with the rearing of the chicks. They breed between April and August, starting when they reach sexual maturity at about two years old.

To attract and court females, the males perform a courtship display flight including cartwheels, dives, and other aerial acrobatics. Birds meet in the air, hook their feet together and spiral down together. They also compete and fight with other males for the chance to mate with a female. If one of the males is successful, the mating pair has only one brood that season, consisting of one to four eggs.

Both the male and female build the nest out of sticks and twigs in a deciduous tree. Once laid, the brown-spotted eggs are typically 49 mm × 39 mm (1.9 in × 1.5 in) and weigh about 42 g (1.5 oz). The female then develops a brood patch and incubates the eggs for 28 days or longer before they hatch.

The hatchlings will appear semialtricial, incapable of any complex coordination, but have open eyes and are covered in down feathers. Chicks have rapid body growth until they are almost at adult body size, when they are capable of walking, flying, and eating without parental help. While in the nest, the female gives most of the parental care, protecting and providing food for the chicks. The male may provide some food for the female and offspring, but his visits are short lived.

Once a prey item is obtained for the nest, the female tears off pieces and feeds the chicks until they are able to rip meat off on their own. Often, the chicks fight for possession of the offered morsel, the younger ones usually losing and not getting enough.

Broad-winged hawks protect their nests in a show of aggression (i.e. diving and chasing) towards any suspected threat, but they generally do not make physical contact. Predators of eggs and nestlings include raccoons, crows, porcupines, and American black bears. Adults have been known to fall to red-tailed hawks, great horned owls, bald eagles, and golden eagles. The hatchlings need 5–6 weeks before they are able to leave the nest. Some young, even after that time, remain in the area of the nest for several weeks more.

In Puerto Rico, broad-winged hawks may be eaten by some growth stage of invasive boa constrictors.
