= Kettle Creek =

Kettle Creek may refer to:

== In Canada ==
- Kettle Creek (Ontario), a tributary of Lake Erie
- Port Stanley, Ontario, a community originally known as Kettle Creek

== In the United States ==
- Kettle Creek (Colorado), a stream in El Paso County
- Kettle Creek (Little River tributary), a stream in Georgia
  - Battle of Kettle Creek, an American Revolutionary War battle
- Kettle Creek (Satilla River tributary), a stream in Georgia
- Kettle Creek (Missouri)
- Kettle Creek (Pennsylvania), a tributary of the West Branch Susquehanna River
  - Kettle Creek State Park, located on this creek
- Kettle Creek (South Fork South Branch Potomac River), West Virginia, a tributary stream
