= Frederick Kettle =

English footballer

Personal information
- Full name: Frederick William Kettle
- Date of birth: 5 February 1875
- Place of birth: Dovercourt, England
- Date of death: 3 March 1951 (aged 76)
- Place of death: Dovercourt, England
- Height: 6 ft 1 in (1.85 m)
- Position: Goalkeeper

Senior career*
Years	Team	Apps	(Gls)
1895–1897	Royal Engineers (Gibraltar)		
1897–1899	Harwich & Parkeston		
1899–1900	Sheffield United		
1901–1905	Harwich & Parkeston		
1906	Colchester Crown		
- * Club domestic league appearances and goals

Frederick William Kettle (5 February 1875 – 3 March 1951) was an English footballer, who played as a goalkeeper. Kettle spent most of his career at local amateur side Harwich & Parkeston, with whom he reached the final of the FA Amateur Cup in 1899, but he spent one season as a professional, with the then reigning FA Cup holders Sheffield United, as a backup to William "Fatty" Foulke. Kettle began his footballing career in Gibraltar, being stationed there for two years with the Royal Engineers, before returning home and being signed by Harwich & Parkeston. After a season at Sheffield United, Kettle intended to re-sign for his hometown club as an amateur, but as his application failed, he could not play amateur football, and missed the 1900–01 season altogether. He later played for Colchester amateur side Colchester Crown.

Kettle was born at the town of Dovercourt, near Harwich, in Essex, and died there at the age of 76.
