= Richard Pough =

American conservationist (1904–2003)

Richard Pough (April 19, 1904 – June 24, 2003) was a major figure in American conservation for more than half of the 20th century. The impact of his work was so broad that he "seemed to be almost everywhere." He initiated efforts to purchase and preserve habitats at locations such as Hawk Mountain in Pennsylvania, Corkscrew Swamp in Florida, Aravaipa Canyon in Arizona, and Congaree Swamp in South Carolina. Pough (pronounced POE) was born in Brooklyn, New York. Following in the footsteps of his parents, he graduated from Massachusetts Institute of Technology in 1926, with a degree in chemical engineering.

After observing the senseless shooting of raptors at Hawk Mountain in 1932, Pough sought a way to put an end to the slaughter and found the answer after speaking about this issue at a joint meeting of the Audubon and Linnaean societies in New York. After attending his talk, Mrs. Rosalie Edge decided to purchase Hawk Mountain and turn it into a sanctuary. Thus began a pattern of tracking down funds to protect habitats and species that Pough employed for the next several decades. This approach is reflected by the title (An Earth-Saving Bulldozer that Runs on Money) of an article about Pough that appeared in Sports Illustrated in 1973. After taking note of Pough's role in turning Hawk Mountain into a sanctuary, the National Audubon Society hired him in 1936 in a position designated for protecting persecuted species. In this capacity, Pough was one of the first to warn of the dangers of DDT, well over a decade before the publication of Silent Spring.

In the winter of 1943-44, Pough visited the Singer Tract in Louisiana to observe the last known Ivory-billed Woodpecker and study its habitat. On the basis of researching the history of the region in terms of human activities (such as cotton farming) and ecological events (such as a severe drought that caused a large die-off of trees in the 1920s), Pough wrote a report, "Present Condition of the Tensas River Forests of Madison Parish, Louisiana, and the Status of the Ivory-Billed Woodpecker in This Area as of January, 1944," to the Executive Director of the National Audubon Society that challenged assertions by James Tanner that the Ivory-billed Woodpecker requires old-growth forest and that the Singer Tract consisted of such habitat. Pough's study is consistent with reports of dozens of sightings of this elusive species between 2004 and 2008 (many decades after the last old-growth swamp forests had been logged) during searches that took place in Arkansas, Florida, and Louisiana. The Ivory-billed Woodpecker disappeared from the Singer Tract as it was being logged, but history might have been different if this habitat destruction had not occurred before Pough blossomed into "the foremost land preservationist of his time."

One of Pough's colleagues, Don Eckelberry, visited the Singer Tract later in 1944 to make paintings of the Ivory-billed Woodpecker based on direct observations. In the years that followed, he produced the artwork for a series of Audubon field guides by Pough that put more of an emphasis on each bird's role in the ecosystem than field guides by Roger Tory Peterson that were published during the same period. In 1948, the American Museum of Natural History hired Pough as chair of the Department of Conservation and General Ecology. Between 1954 and 1956, he served as the founding president of the Nature Conservancy. In 1954, the president of the Audubon Society thought it would be impossible to raise funds in time to save the Corkscrew Swamp from logging that was set to begin in ten days, but Pough stepped in and raised the funding one day before the deadline. Pough was involved in numerous other conservation efforts for species such as the Bermuda Petrel and habitats such as Great Gull Island off the coast of Connecticut.
