= Kettle (birds) =

Term for groupings of birds

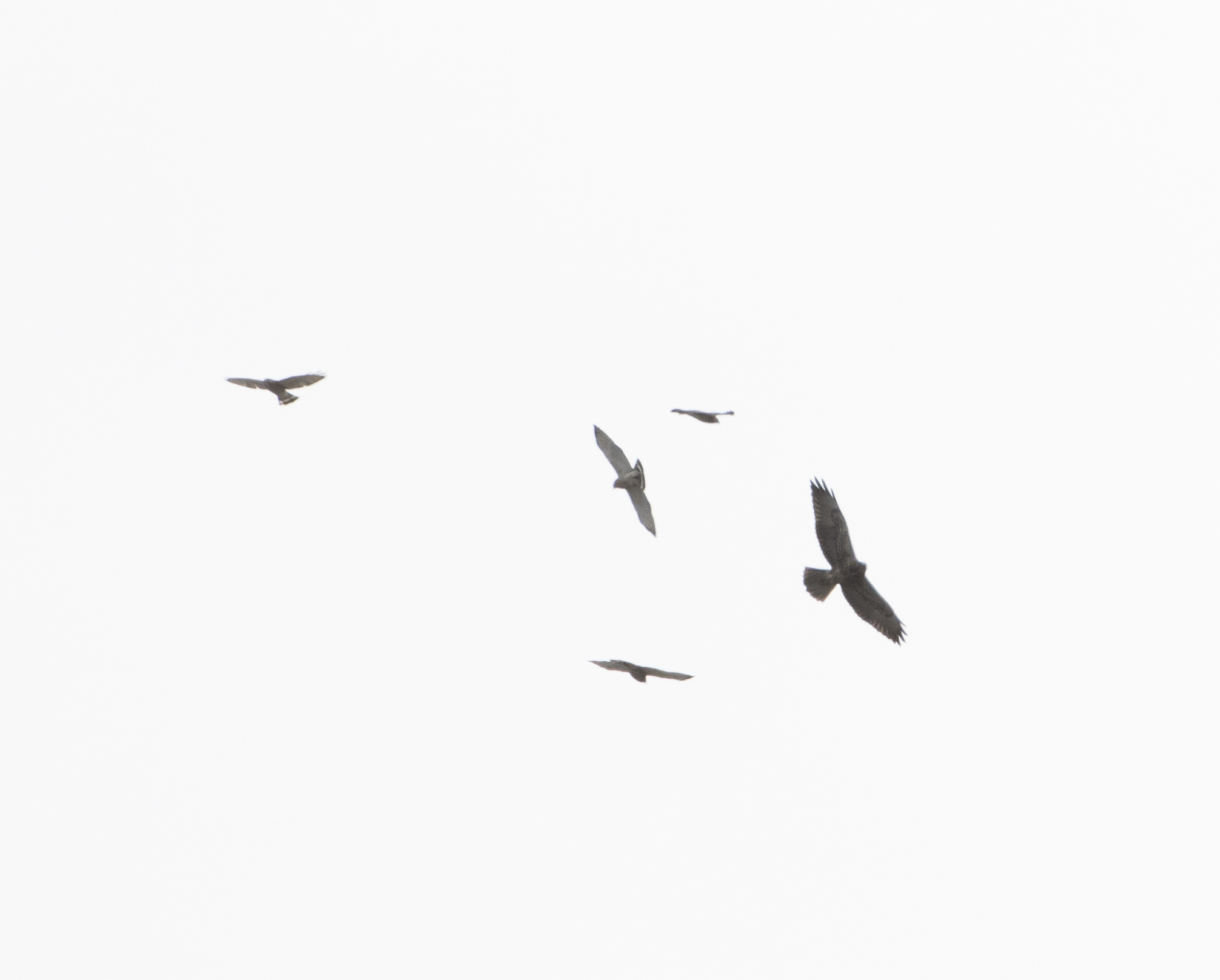
Swainson's and Broad-winged hawks kettling near Whitefish Point, Michigan.

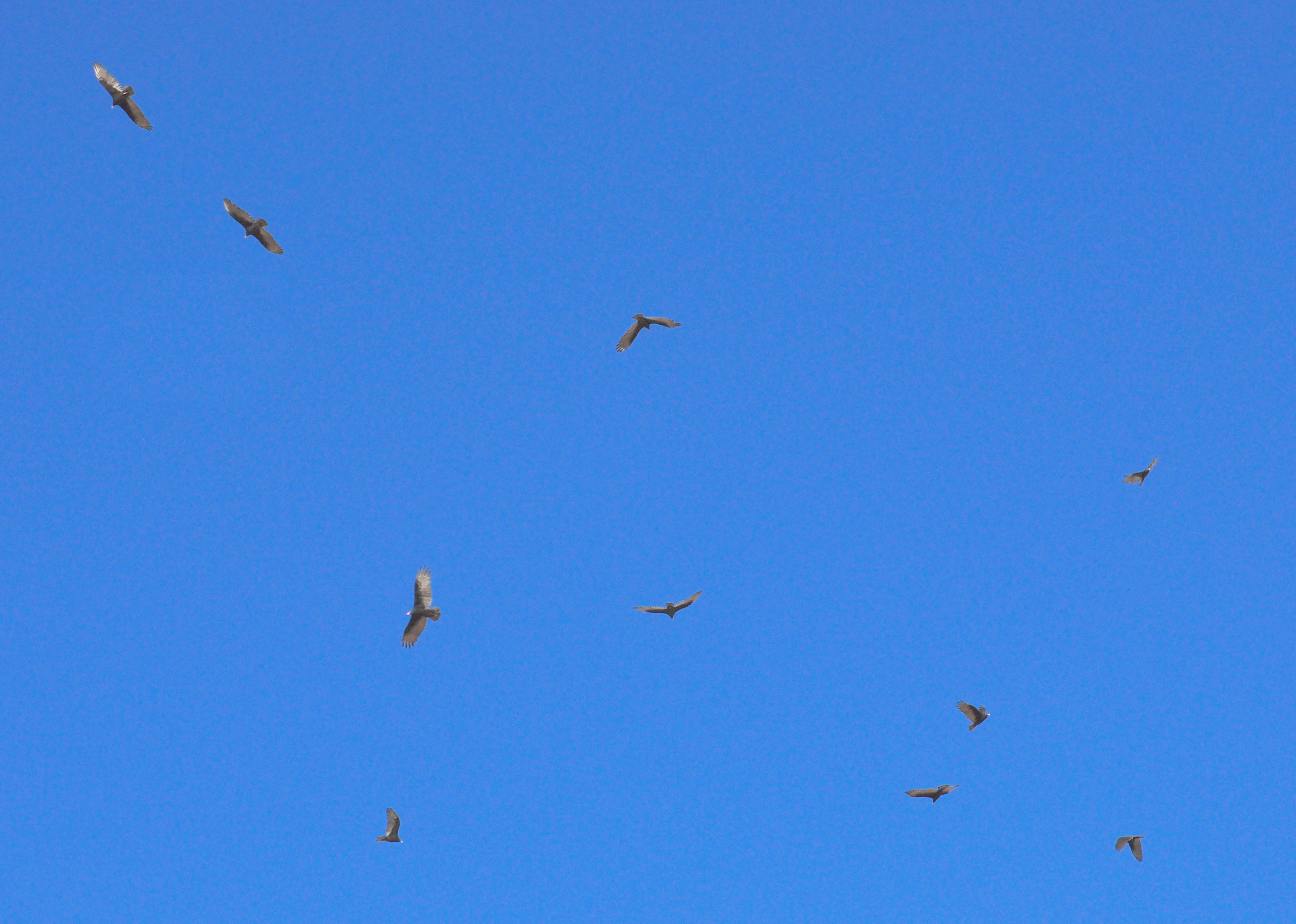
A kettle of Turkey vultures circle their prey over the Mojave Desert

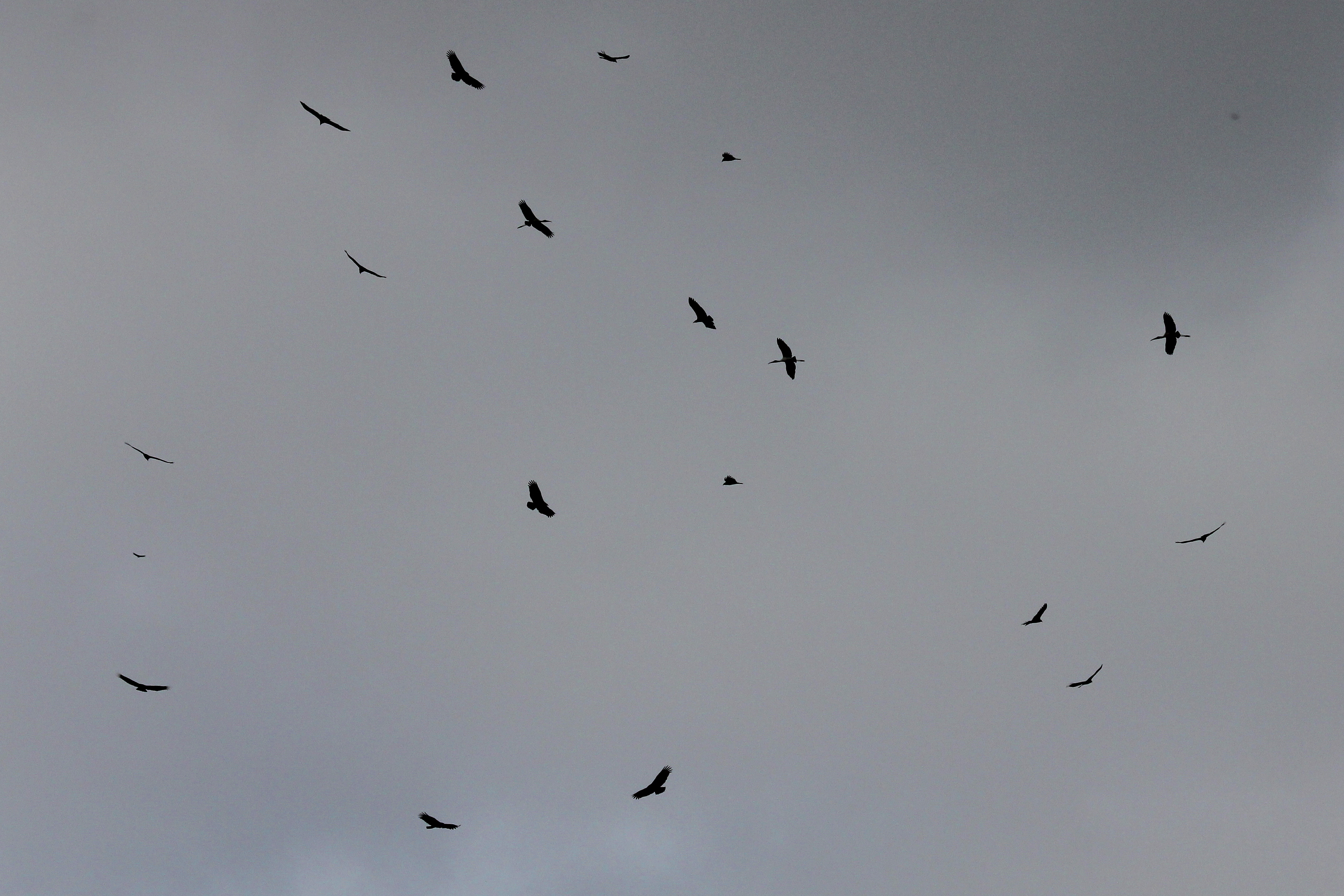
Black vultures and wood storks kettling over Everglades National Park.

A kettle is a group of birds wheeling and circling in the air. The kettle may be composed of several different species at the same time. Nature photographer M. Timothy O'Keefe theorizes that the word derives from the appearance of birds circling tightly in a thermal updraft "like something boiling in a cauldron." Ornithologist Donald Heintzelman has done more than anyone to popularize the term kettle, using the term at least as early as 1970 in his book Hawks of New Jersey to describe raptor flight, followed by uses in print over four decades. The related terms "cauldron" and "boil" are also heard to describe the same sorts of raptor behavior. Osprey-watcher David Gessner, however, claims a Pennsylvania lowland called the Kettle ("der Kessel" in Pennsylvania Dutch), near Hawk Mountain, is the source of the term.

In some species—e.g., the terns of Nantucket—kettling behavior is evidently a way of "staging" a flock in readiness for migration. Pre-migrational turkey vultures kettle by the hundreds in the thermals that rise over Vancouver Island before they venture across the Strait of Juan de Fuca toward Washington State. At Hawk Mountain, broad-winged hawks form kettles in September before flying south. Kettling apparently serves as a form of avian communication—an announcement of imminent departure—as well as a way of gaining altitude and conserving strength.
