= Kettle, West Virginia =

- Unincorporated community
- Location within West Virginia Location within the United States
- Coordinates: 38°34′29″N 81°29′23″W
- Country: United States
- State: West Virginia
- County: Roane
- Elevation: 673 ft (205 m)
- Time zone: UTC-5 (Eastern (EST))
  - Summer (DST): UTC-4 (EDT)
- Area codes: 304 & 681
- GNIS feature ID: 1554867

Kettle is an unincorporated community in Roane County, West Virginia, United States. Kettle is 26 miles (42 km) southwest of Spencer.

The community takes its name from nearby summit which has an outline in the form of a kettle.
