= Hell Kettles =

Body of water in County Durham, England

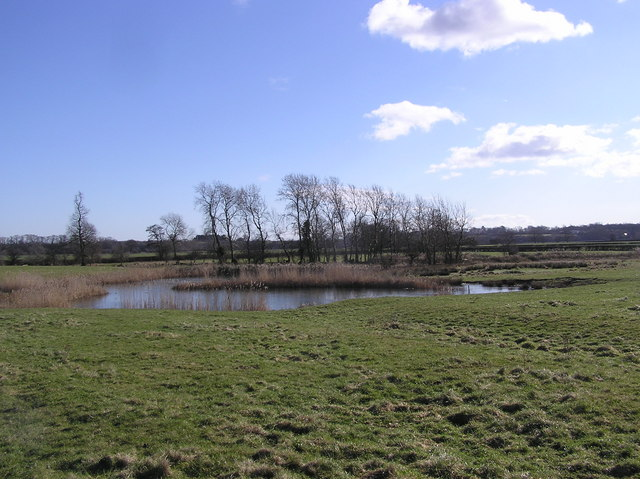
- Hell's Kettles

- Location within County Durham
- Location: MAGiC MaP
- Nearest town: Darlington
- Coordinates: 54°29′34″N 1°34′5″W
- Area: 3.4 ha (8.4 acres)
- Established: 1976
- Governing body: Natural England
- Website: Hell Kettles SSSI

The Hell Kettles are a pair of deep pools near Darlington in County Durham, England. They are a Site of Special Scientific Interest.

== Location ==
The site, which lies on the floodplain of the River Tees, to the south of Darlington, is situated alongside the A167, about 1 mile south of the junction of that road with the A66.

== Origin ==
The Kettles were formed as a result of catastrophic subsidence in 1179. The Permian rocks underlying the area include substantial thicknesses of evaporites—gypsum and gypsiferous mudstone—and subsidence resulting from subterranean dissolution of these beds is a frequent occurrence, though the scale of the Hell Kettles subsidence is exceptional. Surface runoff and seepage from calcareous springs has created the two pools, one of which is the only body of spring-fed open water in County Durham. There were originally four subsidence depressions, but one filled in and two are now linked in a pond aptly named "Double Kettle".

The name "hell kettle" is often applied to ponds that are popularly believed to be bottomless. These particular ponds are mentioned in Holinshed's Chronicles:

There are certeine pits, or rather three little pooles, a mile from Darlington, and a quarter of a mile distant from the These banks which the people call the Kettles of hell, or the diuels Kettles...

— 1587 ed, vol 1, chap 24

It has been suggested that the Kettles may have inspired the scene in Lewis Carroll's Alice's Adventures in Wonderland in which Alice tumbles down a rabbit hole.

== Ecology ==
Despite their proximity, the two pools differ ecologically. "Double Kettle" is fed by surface runoff and its water is turbid, supporting only an impoverished surface vegetation of pondweeds, including the alien Canadian pondweed, Elodea canadensis; it is fringed mainly by common reed, Phragmites australis, with some saw-sedge and common club-rush, Scirpus lacustris.

To the south, the smaller "Croft Kettle" is fed by calcareous subterranean springs and its clear water supports a luxuriant growth of stoneworts; its fringing swamp is dominated by saw-sedge, Cladium mariscus, creating a vegetation type similar to that of the fens of East Anglia and which is found nowhere else in County Durham.

The area around the ponds is mainly damp grassland, with a rich variety of sedges, Carex spp.
