= Rosalie Edge =

American suffragist and environmentalist

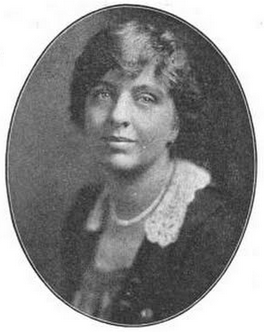
- Rosalie Edge, from a 1917 publication
- Born: Mabel Rosalie Barrow; November 3, 1877; New York City, New York, U.S.
- Died: November 30, 1962 (aged 85); New York City, New York, U.S.
- Known for: Founder of Hawk Mountain Sanctuary and the Emergency Conservation Committee
- Spouse: Charles Noel Edge

Rosalie Barrow Edge (November 3, 1877 – November 30, 1962) was an American environmentalist and suffragist. In 1929, she established the Emergency Conservation Committee to expose the conservation establishment's ineffectiveness and advocate for species preservation. In 1934, Edge also founded the world's first preserve for birds of prey—Hawk Mountain Sanctuary near Kempton, Pennsylvania. Edge was considered the most militant conservationist of her time, and she clashed publicly for decades with leaders of the Audubon Society over approaches to wildlife preservation. An environmentalist colleague described her in 1948 as "the only honest, unselfish, indomitable hellcat in the history of conservation".

== Early life and family ==
Born on November 3, 1877, in New York City, Mabel Rosalie Barrow was the daughter of John Wylie Barrow and Harriet Bowen Barrow. Her British father was a wealthy accountant and cousin to Charles Dickens, whom he resembled, and a near relative of the painter James Abbott McNeill Whistler. Her mother traced her ancestry to Dutch merchant Kiliaen van Rensselaer. The youngest of the five surviving children, Mabel was nicknamed "Noble Girl" or "Noblest Girl" by her father. He favored her over her older siblings and treated her as their leader. (Note: Edge had three other older sisters who died before she was born, leading to an age gap between her and her surviving siblings.) They went for rides together in Central Park, and he nurtured her early love of animals.

When she was 17, while visiting family in England, Barrow met Charles Noel Edge, a British citizen, a graduate of the University of Cambridge and a civil engineer. Their relationship flourished, so when he was sent to Yokohama, Japan, for his work, she followed. They married on May 28, 1909. After traveling in Asia for about three years in connection with Charles's employment, primarily in China and Malaysia, the Edges returned to New York permanently and subsequently had two children: Peter, born in 1913, and Margaret, born in 1915. The marriage was initially very happy, but Charles was frequently absent for work, which, combined with her increasing interest in wildlife, created a rift between them. They separated on February 14, 1924. When Charles died in 1944, he left Rosalie the minimum allowed by New York state law. She challenged the will, winning a larger portion of the estate after about a year in court.

== Early activism ==
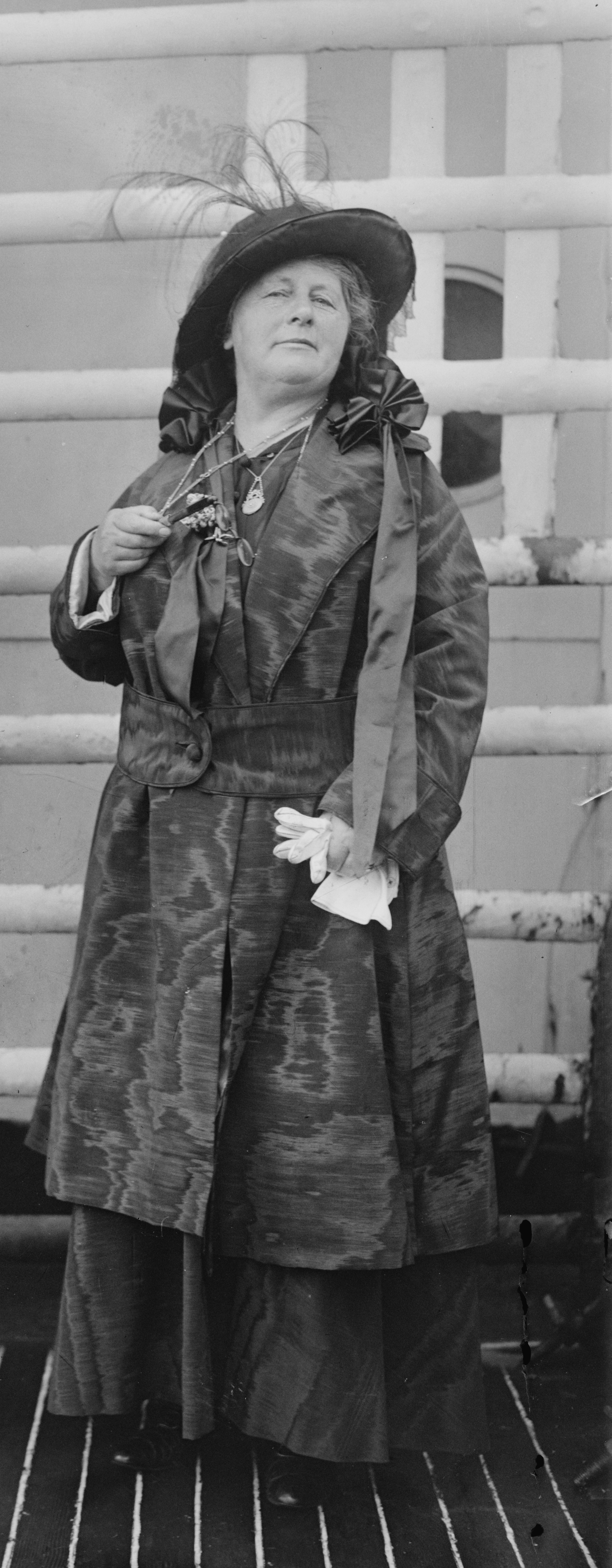
Lady Rhondda, c. 1910–1915

On a 1913 trip from England to New York aboard the Mauretania, Edge met and befriended Sybil Thomas, Viscountess Rhondda. Lady Rhondda, a supporter of the United Kingdom's movement for women's voting rights, taught Edge about the cause, focusing in particular on the activities of her daughter Margaret Mackworth, who had recently been jailed for militant suffragette activities. Recounting the tale decades later, Edge described these discussions with Lady Rhondda as her "first awakening of my mind". Edge did not get involved for a few years, during which she settled her family in New York and gave birth to two children.

In May 1915, shortly before the birth of her second child, Edge felt that she was about to die, and she responded by making donations to charities and causes. These included the suffragist Equal Franchise Society and the National Association of Audubon Societies. Biographer Dyana Z. Furmansky describes the latter donation as an "odd choice", as Edge had not previously shown any interest in bird conservation.

Weeks after giving birth, Edge began participating in the United States' women's suffrage movement, despite Charles Edge's opposition to the cause. She joined the New York State Women's Suffrage Party, becoming corresponding secretary in 1915. Edge gave speeches, wrote pro-suffrage pamphlets and undertook other activities for the cause. When New York State gave women the right to vote, the Party changed its name to the New York State League of Women Voters. From 1919, Edge was the treasurer of the League. The lessons she learned through the campaign, both in her own abilities and the need to engage the public, she took on into her future work.

In 1915, the family purchased Parsonage Point in Rye, New York, and it was while there that Edge began to take a strong interest in birdwatching. It was a way for her to bond with her husband and, critically, her son. She started to take an interest in the birds of New York City, joining ornithologists and amateur birdwatchers in Central Park, and befriended the biologists from the American Museum of Natural History who would frequent the park at lunchtime. It was the plight of the bald eagle which inspired her into activism. After reading of the slaughter of 70,000 bald eagles in the Alaska Territory, without any protest from the leading bird protection organizations of the day, she felt it her duty to act. Edge asserted that it was every person's civic duty to protect nature.

== Emergency Conservation Committee ==
Edge founded and ran the Emergency Conservation Committee (ECC) from 1929 until she died. Operating mainly from its office in Manhattan, the ECC emphasized the need to protect all species of birds and animals while they were common so that they did not become rare. This view has become more influential among scientists working in conservation.

=== Conflict with the Audubon Society ===
Edge was a member of a New York branch of the Audubon Society. The society's many branches included conservationists interested in protecting all wild animals but also those only seeking the preservation of songbirds. Some members were hunters or fishers, working mainly to preserve game areas and to kill predator species. The broad coalition of members was organized by the National Association of Audubon Societies (NAAS), a group that owned and operated wildlife sanctuaries.

In 1929, Willard Van Name, a curator at the American Museum of Natural History, sent her a copy of A Crisis in Conservation. The pamphlet accused the NAAS of working with the sporting organizations to support hunting game birds. The pamphlet claimed the society was only concerned for songbirds and ignored other endangered species. Edge returned to the US and spoke before the annual meeting of the society in October 1929 about the matter. In a voice that recalled Eleanor Roosevelt, she asked challenging questions which set her a reputation as one of the strongest voices in the conservation movement. Museum directors, who also served on the society's board, prohibited Van Name from publishing any more pamphlets critical of the organization. Edge, a former suffragette, stepped in. She played a key role in igniting a member-led uprising within the Audubon Society. Her son, Peter, recalled how the old servants' sitting room in their New York brownstone was transformed into a hub for addressing and mailing boxes of pamphlets. "People who received the pamphlets would send her money," Peter Edge recounted. "Each one included a donation slip, and whenever someone contributed, she responded with a handwritten thank-you note. That's how she financed her conservation efforts."

Edge learned that the Audubon sanctuaries were killing predator animals, including birds of prey, and trapping many small mammals. The organization was clandestinely selling pelts and furs. Edge and the ECC endeavored first to force the entire society board out of office. Unsuccessful, she sued the group for financial mismanagement. In 1931, Edge filed a suit against the NAAS to obtain its membership mailing list. The society's leaders criticized Edge's knowledge and methods; their lawyer referred to Edge as "a common scold", using language reminiscent of an older New York state law targeting nagging wives. A judgment in her favor gave her access to a list of about 11,000 Audubon members who were subsequently informed about what she considered lapses in the organization's defense of birds and wildlife. A bitter feud between Edge and the NAAS led to the resignation of its longtime president and a significant decline in membership. The break between the NAAS and Edge lasted until a few weeks before her death in November 1962.

== Hawk Mountain Sanctuary ==
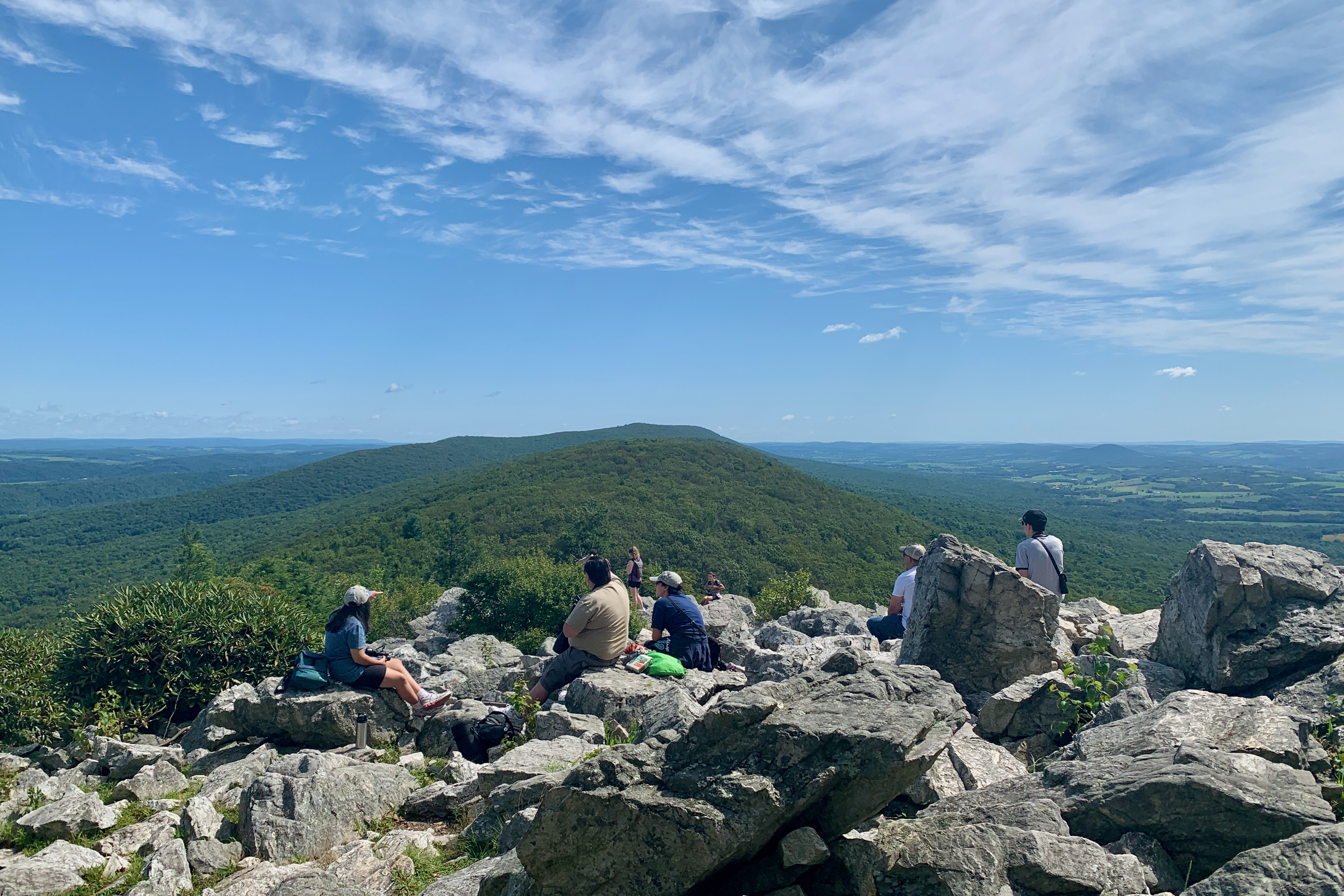
View from North Lookout, Hawk Mountain Sanctuary

Before Edge's intervention, a ridge on Hawk Mountain in Pennsylvania's Appalachian Mountains hosted a decades-long annual shoot targeting hawks and eagles. One such event in 1927 led to the killing of thousands of birds of prey. Conservationist Richard Pough attended the hunt in 1932 and began campaigning for its end. He asked for help from the Audubon Society, the ECC, and other conservation groups, which met together in 1933 and agreed to purchase the land and create a sanctuary.

Audubon Society president T. Gilbert Pearson pledged to raise funds and buy the property, but Edge learned the next year from Pough that the society had not done so. Acting quickly to preempt the fall hawk hunt, Edge signed a contract to lease about 1,340 acres (540 ha) of the ridge land in June 1934, with an option to later purchase it. When she signed the contract, she had not yet secured enough money to afford even the $500 lease payment; she borrowed the money from Van Name. That first year, Edge and her family traveled to the area on weekends and hired caretakers and an armed former police officer to protect the land, which became Hawk Mountain Sanctuary. Edge had the caretakers charge a fee for educational tours and begin collecting data about birds in the area. After two years of leasing the land, Edge purchased it using $2,500 of her own money and funds raised by the ECC; she later transferred ownership to the Hawk Mountain Sanctuary Association. The sanctuary later grew to about 2,600 acres (1,100 ha).

== Death and legacy ==
Edge died on November 30, 1962, after experiencing chest pain. In the final weeks of her life, she made peace with the Audubon Society, receiving a standing ovation at its annual meeting in New York. The society had implemented many of the reforms she and the ECC had advocated for.

As well as founding the ECC and Hawk Mountain Sanctuary, Edge led the national grassroots campaigns to create Olympic National Park (1938) and Kings Canyon National Park (1940). In 1937, she successfully lobbied Congress to purchase about 8,000 acres (3,200 ha) of old-growth sugar pines on the perimeter of Yosemite National Park that were to be logged. She influenced founders of The Wilderness Society, The Nature Conservancy, and Environmental Defense Fund, along with other major wildlife protection and environmental organizations created during and just after the 30 years when she was active in the conservation movement. Van Name described Edge in 1948 as "the only honest, unselfish, indomitable hellcat in the history of conservation". Scientist and author Rachel Carson visited Hawk Mountain Sanctuary repeatedly and used data on bird populations collected by its caretakers as evidence in her influential 1962 book Silent Spring.

A photocopy of Edge's typescript autobiography was released in 1978 under the title An Implacable Widow.
