= Hawk Mountain Ranger School =

Col. Phillip Neuweiler Memorial Ranger Training Facility
- Hawk Mountain Ranger School

Location
- 218 Pine Swamp Road; Kempton, Pennsylvania; United States; 40.626082°N 75.939361°W

Information
- Type: Search and rescue school
- Motto: "That Others May Live"
- Established: 1956
- Founder: Colonel Phillip Neuweiler, CAP
- Status: Open
- Commander / Activity Director: Major Brian Bartle, CAP
- Campus: Colonel Phillip Neuweiler Memorial Training Facility
- Colors: Orange and Black
- Nickname: "Hawk" or "The Mountain" or "HMRS"
- Affiliations: Civil Air Patrol
- Website: www.capranger.org

Hawk Mountain Ranger School (HMRS) is a Search and Rescue school operated by the Pennsylvania Wing of the Civil Air Patrol (CAP). The school is located in the foothills of the Blue Mountains on 77 acres of Civil Air Patrol corporate property. The Summer School, which is the school's longest and most popular event, is a National Cadet Special Activity (with the exception of 2024).

On September 11, 2004, the school was rededicated as the Colonel Phillip Neuweiler Ranger Training Facility, in honor of its founder Colonel Phillip Neuweiler, the former Pennsylvania Wing Commander from the late 1940s to early 1970s.

== Location ==
The school is located on 77 acres (310,000 m^{2}) of CAP corporate property Kempton, Pennsylvania. The school is on the side of the Blue Mountains, approximately a mile south of the Hawk Mountain Bird Sanctuary. The school's base camp is located in a clearing off of Pine Swamp Road. However, the school's activities make use of several hundred acres of state game land in the surrounding hills, including several sections of the Appalachian Trail and accompanying side trails.

== History ==
After World War II, Civil Air Patrol shifted its focus away from patrolling sea lanes and anti-submarine warfare to enlarging its Search and Rescue operations. During the early 1950s, Colonel Phillip Neuweiler saw an increasing need for trained rescue teams for use by Civil Air Patrol's Pennsylvania Wing, which he commanded. In 1953 USAF Pararescue and survival instructors trained Pennsylvania Wing Search & Rescue teams at Westover AFB, Massachusetts. The Air Force instructors were so inspired by the dedication, motivation, and quality of the students that they called their students 'Rangers.'

Motivated by the success of the training, Col Neuweiler moved the school to a property he owned in Berks County in 1956. During this time, the school was staffed by both Civil Air Patrol members and USAF personnel. In the early 1960s, a cadet staff training program was implemented, and, combined with expertise of CAP personnel, eventually replaced the need for extensive USAF personnel for training.

By the mid 1970s, several similar schools had appeared elsewhere in Civil Air Patrol. Other nationally recognized Ranger schools began to emerge. Iowa Wing had the North Central Region Special Service Corps (the Blue Berets), Missouri Wing Pathfinder Technical school, and a similar program was Washington Wing's Challenger School. All of these schools were designated as National Emergency Assistance Training schools, or NEAT schools, by CAPNHQ in 1974, and served as the basis for CAP's emergency services training.

In July 1996, Brigadier General Richard Anderson, the CAP National Commander at the time, visited the Hawk Mountain Ranger School and recognized its lasting contributions, and called it the Harvard School of Search & Rescue.

In the spring of 2004, the school began a major infrastructure reconstruction. Trees were cleared at the base camp, eight new operation huts were constructed on raised pedestals, new latrines and shower facilities were constructed. A new gravel road was constructed leading up to the memorial gardens and chapel area. The new construction was dedicated on September 11, 2004, and the training area was rededicated as the 'Col. Phillip Neuweiler Memorial Training Center'.

On April 14, 2007, members of HMRS broke ground on a new 60-foot (18 m) climbing and rappelling tower. By July 7 the tower was mostly completed, but construction was halted for the duration of the Summer School. After graduation of the 2007 class, work on the tower was resumed, and the tower completed by August.

== The Ranger Program ==
Advancement through the various Ranger classes or grades requires a student to demonstrate knowledge of or proficiency in certain skills. There are often practical, physical, and administrative sections.

- Ranger Third Class (R/3) is the basic level of Ranger Grades. An R-3 is proficient in basic search skills, wilderness mobility, basic knots, and basic wilderness skills. Cadets must have earned their Curry Achievement (see Cadet grades and insignia of the Civil Air Patrol), and senior members must have completed Level 1 training.
- Ranger Second Class (R/2) is the intermediate level of Ranger Grades. An R-2 can perform basic land navigation, intermediate wilderness skills, a broader range of knots, and basic first aid. Cadets must also have earned Cadet Senior Airmen, and seniors must have declared a specialty track.
- Ranger First Class (R/1) is the advanced level of Ranger Grades. An R-1 can perform advanced land navigation, advanced survival skills, and advanced search techniques. R-1 qualified members are utilized to assist leading a Ground Team. Cadets must have earned Cadet Technical Sergeant, and senior members must have achieved a Technician rating in their specialty track.
- Advanced Ranger (R/Adv) is the team leader level of Ranger Grades. Advanced Rangers are capable of leading Ground Search Teams in complex search environments using advanced land navigation and technical rescue, and are able to instruct all aspects to their level in the Ranger Program. Cadets must earn Cadet Second Lieutenant, and senior members must attend Squadron Leadership School.
- Instructor (R/I) is the second highest level of Ranger Grades, and is reserved for those people who choose not to test for Expert Ranger. For Instructor, an Advanced Ranger must possess several qualifications from the Red Cross and FEMA, attend Special Advanced Winter School, be knowledgeable in at least three different disciplines that benefit the Ranger Program (e.g. possess Emergency Medical Technician ratings, have completed prior military service, Incident Commander ratings from FEMA, be a Registered Nurse, etc.), and be active in the Ranger Program for at least five years after being awarded Advanced Ranger. Cadets must earn Cadet Captain, and senior members must attain a Senior Rating in their specialty track.

Expert Rangers are authorized to wear the Expert Ranger tab above the Civil Air Patrol tape on their field uniforms while participating in Ranger Sanctioned Activities.

- Expert Ranger (R/Ex) Expert Ranger is the highest level of Ranger Grades. An Expert Ranger is a Ground Branch Director credentialed as an expert in wilderness search and rescue, survival, and navigation. Expert Rangers form the leadership of the development of the Ranger Program, and are expert instructors in all aspects of the program. Candidates must pass a battery of practical and written tests, and their final acceptance is contingent upon the unanimous approval of a quorum of current Expert Rangers. Expert Rangers are awarded a Black Pistol Belt for wear with their utility uniforms.

== The Field Medic Course ==
Just as the Ranger Program was started, a need was apparent for medical training. However, for the first seven years of the Ranger program, all medical support was provided by Air Force personnel.

Beginning in 1960, Dr. William E.B. Hall of Allentown, Pennsylvania, began providing for most of the health care needs of Pennsylvania Wing CAP, and consequently HMRS as well. As a CAP lieutenant colonel, Dr Hall commanded the PA Wing Hospital Squadron 3102, consisting of professional nurses, doctors, and other qualified medical personnel.

In the early 1970s, Lieutenant Don Kliptein recognized that many of the cadets coming to the school already had extensive medical backgrounds, but no ranger experience. In 1971, Lt Kliptein began training Cadets to assist Sq 3102 in providing medical assistance to other cadets. Cadet medics helping injured cadets quickly improved the overall atmosphere of the cadet program, leading to the introduction of the first dedicated medical course in 1973. This new course was structured to tie in directly with the Ranger program. Medic trainees would accompany Ranger trainees during the Field Training Exercise portion of Summer Schools, combining both Ranger experience with Medical training.

Today's Ranger Medical Program still follows the model developed by Lt Klipstein in the 70's. Today there are 4 medic grades (Field Medic to Master Medic). Student medics begin their training with a base certification as Emergency Medical Responders with additional training in field sanitation and hygiene and support of Ranger Operations. As personnel progress, they complete more specialized training in the incident command system, SAR operations, mass casualty operations and advanced medical training. M1's are required to be first responders and Senior medics must be EMT-Basics and hold PHTLS certification. All levels of qualification currently are required to complete annual continuing education requirements and requalification in core skills and knowledge every 3 years. Today's medical operations function out of modernized free standing climate controlled clinic building. Usually staffed by a physician capable of advanced medical care; thus limiting the number and frequency of off base transport for routine and urgent medical problems.

In 2010, HMRS started building the Donna Connor Memorial Training Building. Captain Donna Connor bequeathed HMRS $10,000 for a medical training building. HMRS received other donations towards this building and National Headquarters matched funds donated. The 800-square-foot building provides a dedicated, climate-managed four-season classroom and program management office as well as secure storage for training supplies and is equipped with a number of technology upgrades to improve the overall quality of medical and other training delivered.

=== Medic advancement ===
- Field Medic is the introductory level of the Medic Program. Members with the Field Medic certification are qualified in Adult CPR and Wilderness First Responder after completing the basic course. Field Medics are awarded a green scarf to wear with their uniform.
- Field Medic 1st Class is the basic level of the Medic Program, and is the typical medic assigned to a Ranger Team. In addition to CPR and Wilderness First Responder, they have completed several base assignments as a Field Medic, and completed on the job training in advanced skills, such as medicinal wild plants. Field Medic 1st Class' are awarded Red Scarves to wear with their uniform.
- Senior Medic is the advanced level of the Medic Program. Although qualified to assist ground teams, Senior Medics typically support base operations or even multi-agency mission bases. Senior Medics must be at least 18 years of age, hold EMT-B qualifications or higher, and be well versed in several areas of advanced medical care. Senior Medics are awarded Red Scarves to wear with their uniform.
- Master Medic is the expert level of the Medic Program. represent the leadership of the Medic Program, and are similar to Expert Rangers. They typically hold instructor ratings in multiple medical fields, and have completed multiple on the job and field assignments as a Senior Medic. Candidates must have been qualified as a Senior Medic for five years prior to becoming a Master Medic. In addition to the Red Scarf, Master Medics are awarded a Red Belt. Only 26 people have become Master Medics since 1972.

== Curriculum ==
The school offers courses of varying durations, ranging from afternoon activities to programmes lasting a week and a half. Its staff aim to keep costs low, making it one of the least expensive National Cadet Special Activities offered by the Civil Air Patrol.

=== Summer School ===
The Summer School is the largest training session at the school, and is offered in mid-July. The summer school is one of many nationally recognized cadet activity. Depending on which course the student registered for, and which courses for which the student is eligible, they will be assigned to one of the following courses.

- Basic Ranger Course covers fundamental search and rescue skills in the Ranger Program and Civil Air Patrol, such as basic search techniques, basic land navigation, and basic survival skills. The Cadet Basic Course implements strict military discipline alongside intense training, whereas the Senior Basic Course focuses more on academics. Cadet Squadrons for the Basic Course are Squadrons Bravo, Charlie, and Delta, and the Senior Squadron is Squadron Sierra. Target graduation qualifications are Ranger 2nd Class and Ground Team Member level 2.
- Advanced Ranger Course covers advanced techniques in search and rescue, such as advanced land navigation, fundamental rope rescue, advanced survival skills, and basic team leadership. The course is only open to Cadets. The one Advanced squadron is Squadron Alpha. Target graduation qualifications are Ranger 1st Class and Ground Team Member level 1
- Team Commanders Course covers team leadership, advanced land navigation, GPS use, technical rescue, and Ranger Team instructor skills. The course is open to both Cadets and Seniors, and is focused on creating competent and skilled Ranger Team Commanders for the member's home units. The Team Commanders Course squadron is Squadron Tango. Target graduation qualifications are Advanced Ranger and Ground Team Leader.
- Independent Study Course covers skills required by individuals for their skill advancement. Each student has their curriculum tailored to their individual needs. This course can be tailored so a student can obtain the Expert Ranger qualification. Members wishing to enter Independent Study must have completed the Team Commanders Course. The course is open to Seniors and Cadets, and the one Independent Study squadron is Squadron X-Ray.
- Aircrew Survival Course covers survival fundamentals for CAP Aircrew members. Skills include edible plants, shelter construction, underwater egress, signalling, and water procurement. The course is open to members 18 and older, and the squadron is Hotel Squadron.
- Field Medic Course is the basic course required to obtain the Field Medic rating. Students must have completed a previous summer school and have been awarded the Ranger 2nd Class qualification. The course covers Wilderness First Responder and trains members to be a part of HMRS medical staff. The course is only open to cadets, and is called Mike Squadron.
- Field Communicators Course covers skills for Mission Radio Operators and Communications Unit Leaders, two advanced qualifications for radio communications within CAP. The squadron is Whiskey Squadron, and is open to both Seniors and Cadets.
- Ranger Staff Training is the course required to become a member of probationary staff at HMRS. The course covers leadership skills, instruction techniques, survival skills, and drill and ceremonies. The course is only open to Cadets. The course is an on the job training course, pairing Staff Candidates with a basic Squadron. The full-time staff mentors the staff candidates throughout the duration of the school. Staff Candidates then finish their course with a four-day survival hike, requiring candidates to travel overland back to HMRS base while using minimal equipment. Successful candidates are awarded the Yellow Scarf and are recognized as Probationary Staff.
- Incident Leadership Course is the course for Ground Branch Director, which is CAP's qualification for members coordinating ground search and rescue teams on a mission. The course covers leadership fundamentals and FEMA courses required for the qualification. The squadron is India Squadron.

After four days at and around the school grounds, the entire school goes on a multi-day field training exercise (FTX) to put recently learned skills into action. Most training is conducted on the nearby Appalachian Trail, but some training is conducted off-site at fire training facilities or other nearby locations.

Upon returning from the FTX, students are administered tests to achieve higher Ranger grades. After testing, squadrons perform skits that dramatize their experiences at Hawk, and a graduation ceremony is held prior to cadet's departures.

=== Winter School ===
Winter School is a cold-weather survival school typically held during the month of February. Students learn through first hand experience how to conduct Search and Rescue in cold-weather environments. Advanced students learn about shelter construction and how to survive in a cold environment with minimal equipment. Two sessions of Winter School may be offered: one at Hawk Mountain, and one on the western side of Pennsylvania near Pittsburgh a few weeks later.

- Introduction to Winter OPS is not a requirement course, however is helpful for cadets and seniors with no experience to winter operations. This course serves to provide baseline education about first aid, navigation, and survival in a winter environment.
- Basic Course is a first-year course that gives cadets and seniors the ability to learn about cold-weather patient evacuation, scenarios, and a range of skills useful in cold-weather environments.
- Advanced Course is a course only available to students who have successfully completed the Basic Course. It goes more in-depth into the topics covered in the basic course, and is helpful for cadets pursuing their Ranger First Class rating.
- Special Advanced Course is geared towards students pursuing their Advanced or Expert Ranger rating. It teaches students about shelter-making, cold weather survival, and other advanced-level topics.

=== Other Schools ===
Ranger Team Competition

Teams of Rangers compete against each other in a simulated Search and Rescue scenario. During the competition, teams are evaluated on such areas as: individual equipment, team equipment, search procedures, communications, physical fitness, navigation, rescue and evacuation, leadership, fire building, and other search and rescue related skills. Winners of this event typically receive a monetary donation from the school for the purchase of team equipment.

First Aid Weekend

The first aid weekend typically offers courses in First Aid, CPR, and AED use. Graduates are certified by the Red Cross.

Ranger Staff Training Weekends

Eight staff training weekends are held throughout the spring to train cadets to serve as staff members for schools. Cadets must participate in all seven weekends to successfully complete the cycle. The staff training usually consists of more vigorous physical training and mental testing than is found in the other schools. The reason being to test the staff candidates to their limits.

Navigation Weekend

Navigation weekend is usually held in early September. It was originally created by John McGuire, former commander of CAP Pennsylvania Squadron 109, as the Escape and Evasion program. This weekend instructs students in map reading, navigation, compass use, course plotting, mobility, aeronautical navigation, and team mobility.

Air Crew Survival Training

This course, offered simultaneously with the Navigation weekend, instructs aircrew in the topics of survivability, aircraft survival kits, shelter building, signaling, water procurement, fire building, and the mental aspects associated with survival.

Emergency Services Weekend

ES weekend, held in the mid Spring, is an introductory course to the fundamentals of Emergency Services. Students learn a variety of skills, including: types of searches, search lines procedures, basic map and compass skills, litter and stokes tie-in and carries, operation of radio direction finder equipment, equipment needed for basic search & rescue, land navigation, basic health and medical skills, and knots.

GOALS Krista Griesacker Memorial Adventure Race

This 12-Hour adventure race is held annually in honor of a former staff cadet. Krista Greisacker had spent many years training and instructing at HMRS in the 1980s. The race encompasses orienteering, cycling, mountain biking, canoeing, and rappelling. Proceeds from this race are donated to improving the facilities at HMRS.

== Hawk Mountain Distance Learning Center ==
In an effort to rekindle interests in the Ranger program, several staff members from HMRS started the 'Hawk Mountain Distance Learning Center'(HMDLC). The HMDLC would send instructors and materials to other states interested in starting a school, and would provide logistical support to get the school running.

The first such expedition was to the Snake Creek Ranger Training Area in Miramar, Florida in 2004.

In 2005, HMRS re-introduced a Staff Training squadron during their summer school to allows returning members from distant states the opportunity to become Ranger Staff.

The 2020 Summer School marked the first cancellation of a Summer School in 64 years, due to COVID-19. As a response, Ranger Staff introduced their 2020 Distance Learning program, providing online lectures through Google Classroom and Zoom.

== Physical Fitness ==
Hawk Mountain Ranger School offers various programs.

=== Tests ===
• Ranger 3rd Class: 1 pull-up, 5 push-ups, 10 squat thrust in 1 minute, 1/2 mile run in 6 minutes.
• Ranger 2nd Class: 2 pull-ups, 10 push-ups, 15 squat thrust in 1 minute, 1/2 mile run in 5 minutes.
• Ranger 1st Class: 3 pull-ups, 15 push-ups, 20 squat thrusts in 1 minute, 1/2 mile in 4 minutes.
• Advanced Ranger: 4 pull-ups, 20 push-ups, 20 squat thrusts in 1 minute, 1 mile run in 8 minutes.
• Expert Ranger: 5 pull-ups, 20 squat thrusts in 1 minute, 1 mile run in 9 minutes, 10 foot vertical rope climb, 100m swim, 10 ft dive and weight retrieval

=== Obstacle Course ===
Adjacent to the parade field is an obstacle course that is maintained by the school. Daily inspections of the course ensures the course is prepared well before cadets begin traversing the course.

=== Three Ball Soccer ===
A traditional Physical Training event at the school is Three Ball Soccer. Played in the parade field, this variation of the game Soccer pits one team against another, with three balls in play simultaneously. Teams are allowed to field as many players as they are able. Games are officiated by Ranger Staff, who may join either team at their own discretion.

=== Squadron Runs ===
As an alternative to Three Ball Soccer, squadrons occasionally run up and down Pine Swamp Road. Cadets are encouraged to call jodies they may know as well as create some of their own.

== Ranger Staff ==
The 2008 HMRS Ranger Staff Handbook defines Ranger Staff as being:

... highly trained, extremely motivated, and well disciplined member of the Ranger Program, who lives by a strict code of ethics and an honor code. [He or she] would rather resign that bring disgrace upon the Ranger Program. They are dedicated and committed to achieving the goals of Civil Air Patrol and the Ranger Program. They are dedicated not to any one person but rather the Program as a whole. [He or she] is dedicated to the art of teaching and the principles of training. A Staff [Member]'s leadership training lends itself to accomplishing the mission faster and more effectively. Ranger and Medical training is a key ingredient to aiding the injured and saving lives. [He or she] will never fail at anything they do. If something does not turn out as expected, it is used as a learning experience and will eventually enhance their ongoing training. [He or she] welcomes the challenge of doing the unexpected or untried. Staff members are trained to forge ahead and create a path rather than follow others or to sit by idly. [He or she] is trained to identify, adapt, an overcome difficult situations or obstacles.

The Ranger Staff Motto is "We Lead."

=== History of the Ranger Staff ===
As the Ranger Program expanded and gained national recognition in the late 1950s, leaders of the program saw an increasing need for more staff members to oversee the program. Especially few were cadet leaders capable of instructing other cadets.

In 1960, Lieutenant Colonel John Weaver developed a program to train cadets as Ranger Staff at Hawk Mountain Ranger School (HMRS). At the time, Lt Col Weaver was commander of Pennsylvania Wing's Ranger program, and appointed Major John McNabb to oversee the new cadet staff program.

As the Ranger program matured, it also expanded well beyond the boundaries of Pennsylvania. As students from other states attended HMRS, they took home the knowledge and pride they earned. Inspired by several cadets, Major Fred Graham of the Florida Wing began a Ranger Staff Training Program in the Everglades. Staff Cadets from Florida served alongside Pennsylvania Wing Staff members at HMRS, as well as at the Ranger School in Black River, Mississippi.

=== Staff Training ===
Ranger Staff training typically occurs over eight weekends from early Spring through early summer. Each weekend focuses on a different area of staff expertise, such as 'survival weekend' or 'ropes weekend.'

Staff training is typically broken into two groups. New staff trainees train together to familiarize themselves with what is expected of a Ranger Staff Member, while returning staff members typically focus on enhancing their leadership abilities and knowledge of the various Ranger disciplines.

In the Summer of 2005, Hawk Mountain Ranger School began offering a summer course to train cadets to be Ranger Staff. This course compresses the entire 8 weekend traditional course into approximately 9 days, conducted simultaneously with the school's other summer courses. This course is offered to further promote the CAP Ranger program beyond Pennsylvania.

For the 2020 Summer School, the Staff Training curriculum was again updated, changing the format to be an on-the-job learning assignment rather than a separate squadron. The course, along with the 2020 school, was cancelled due to the COVID-19 pandemic, but will be integrated for the 2021 school year.

For the 2024 Summer School,

== Ranger Schools ==
Several Schools have been created solely for the purpose of training CAP Rangers. Those that still operate today are:

- Hawk Mountain Ranger School, the original Ranger School created by Col Phillip Neuweiler in Pennsylvania
- Florida Wing Glades Ranger School, A School originally operated in the 1970s and 80s, reopened in 2004
- Snake Creek Ranger Training Area (Now the Snake Creek Wilderness School), where the Florida Ranger Program was resurrected in 2004, and later again in 2024. Also known as the Florida Falcon Ranger Academy
- North Carolina Wing Ranger Training Weekend (RTW), held in Morrow Mountain State Park, NC

Schools that have closed are:

- Black River Mississippi Ranger School, operated in 1975 and 76
- Everglades of Florida Ranger School, first operated in 1970 by Major Fred Graham to train Ranger Staff
- Puerto Rico Ranger School, developed by Colonel Bartolo Ortiz

== Ranger Base Uniform ==
Hawk Mountain Ranger school has developed additions to the Airman Battle Uniform to easily denote staff members. These uniforms are only worn at Hawk Mountain hosted events and by Ranger Teams.

Bib Scarves

Scarves comply with US military specifications. They are worn around the neck and are tucked into the ABU blouse. When blouses are removed due to high temperatures, scarves are also removed.

- Grey Scarves denote Ranger Staff trainees, and are only worn during Ranger Staff Training. These scarves are also worn by Ranger Team members. These scarves may also be worn by participants of the "Romeo" Squadron during Summer School, referred to as Team Commanders in Training.
- Yellow Scarves denote Ranger Staff who have completed one year of Staff Training, who are referred to as "Probationary Staff"
- Orange Scarves denote Ranger Staff who have completed a second year of Staff Training, who are referred to as "Permanent Staff"
- Green Scarves denote Ranger Field Medics, personnel that have completed the initial training course.
- Red Scarves denote Medic First Class, Senior Medics, and Master Medics.
- White Scarves denote Senior or Cadet Ranger Team Commanders.

Pistol belts

Staff Members wear a pistol belt at all times. Despite their name, no pistol is worn on the belt, nor is other equipment

- White Belt denotes a Ranger Staff member or Ranger Team member.
- Black Belt denotes an Expert Ranger.
- Red Belt denotes a Master Medic.

Shirts

There are three colors that vary from the standard BDU black T-shirt.

- Orange Shirt There are two variations of print on the orange shirt. Staff members wear an orange shirt with a Staff keystone, whereas Ranger Team members wear an orange shirt with the Hawk Mountain logo.
- Red Shirt Field Medics through Master Medics wear a red shirt.
- Black Shirt The black shirt is worn by Expert Rangers only.

Whistle Chain

Staff members wear a silver whistle chain with whistle affixed to the ABU blouse and tucked into the left pocket.

Orange Hat

The orange hat is a baseball-type hat with a few different embroidered designs. Officers wear cloth insignia affixed centered on the caps or keystone device.

- Orange Hat with Hawk Mountain Symbol denotes Hawk Mountain students and Hawk Mountain Basic Staff.
- Orange Hat with red keystone denotes Hawk Mountain Permanent Staff.
- Orange hat with black keystone denotes an Instructor or an Expert Ranger.

Field Medics and Probationary Staff who hold rank as Cadet Officers will wear grade insignia affixed to the center of their hat. Medics First Class, Senior Medics, Master Medics, Permanent Staff, Instructors, and Expert Rangers will wear grade insignia affixed to the keystone on their hat.

Ranger Tapes

The Ranger Tapes are a series of military style badges of the School. The tapes signify qualification as a Ranger. Various levels of the award exist, one for each grade of CAP Ranger, the highest grade being that of Expert Ranger. Those successfully graduating from Hawk Mountain Ranger Schools are presented with the Ranger Tape equivalent to the grade of award they have earned. The tape is worn above the left breast pocket. The award is only worn on field uniforms (such as the Battle Dress Uniform). This award is not authorized for wear on any United States military uniform.

As of the August 2021 CAPR 39-1 revision, the wear of the Ranger Tab is not authorized outside of sanctioned Hawk Mountain activities.

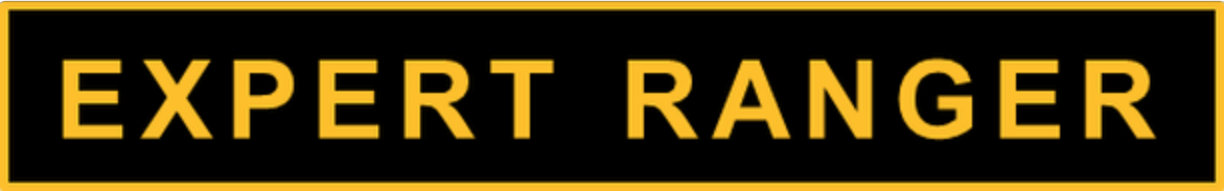
Expert Ranger (R/Ex)

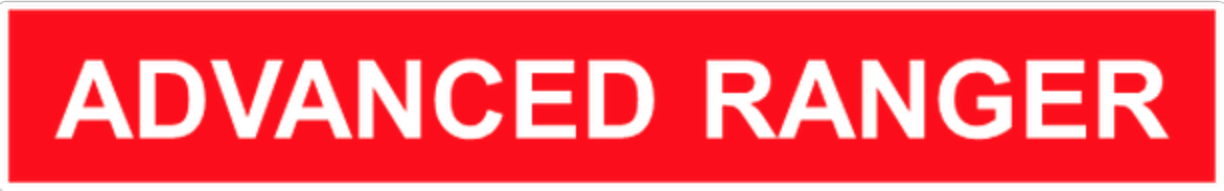
Advanced Ranger (R/Adv)

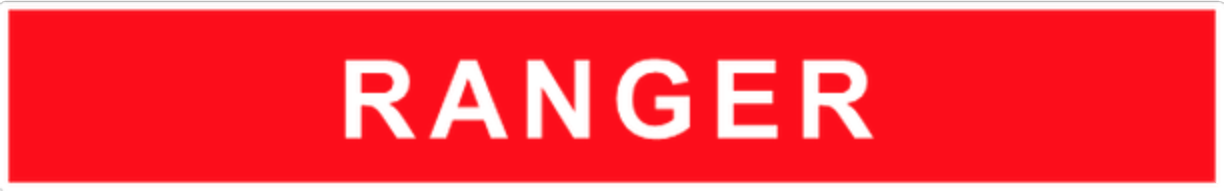
Ranger First Class (R/1)

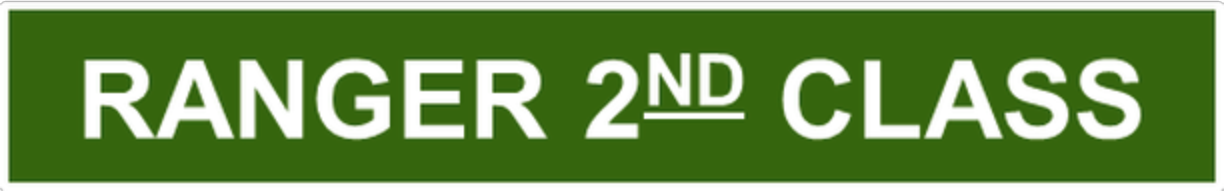
Ranger Second Class (R/2)

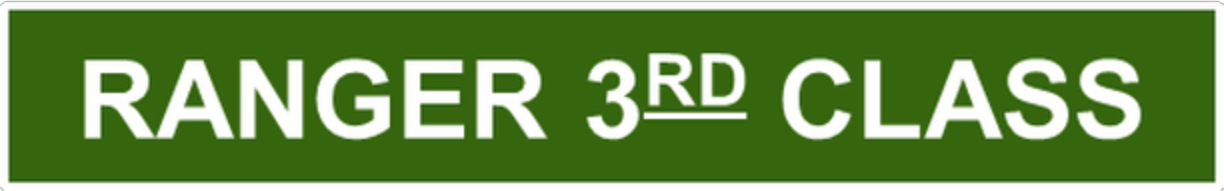
Ranger Third Class (R/3)

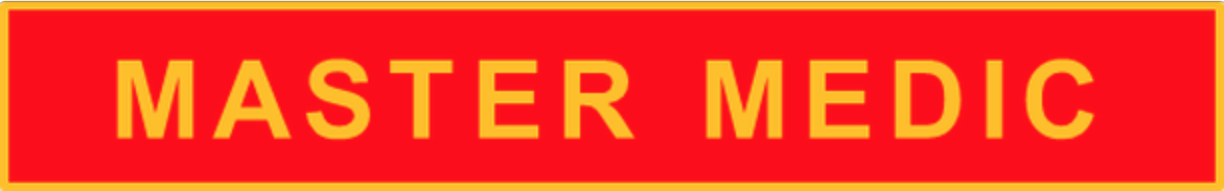
Master Medic (R/MM)

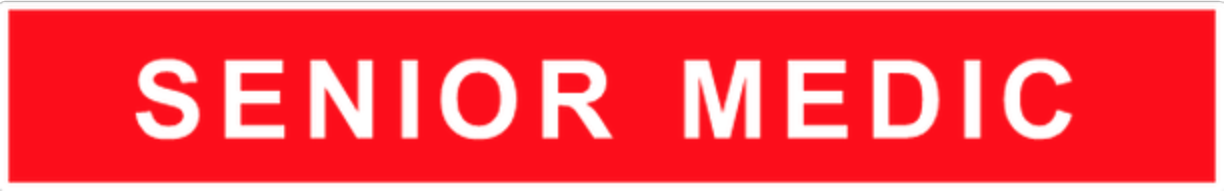
Senior Medic (R/SM)

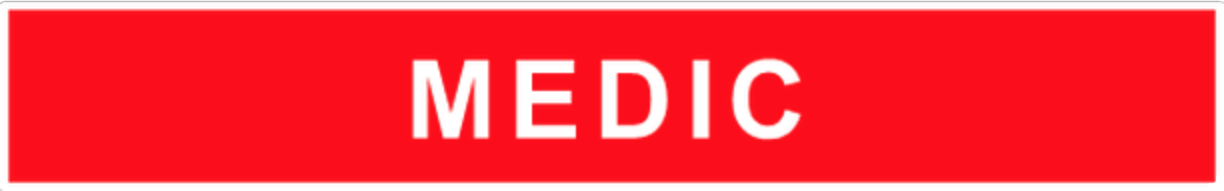
Field Medic First Class (R/M1C)

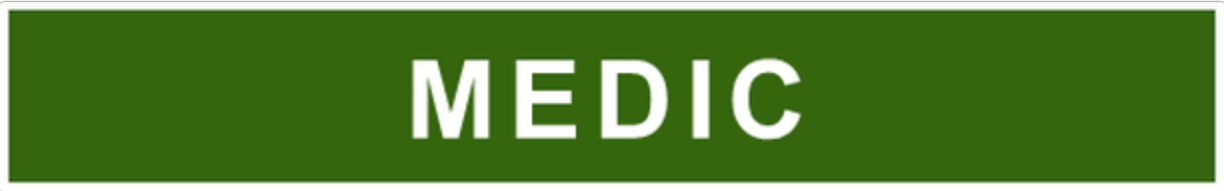
Field Medic (R/FM)

== See also ==
- Hawk Mountain Scout Reservation
