= The Pinnacle (Pennsylvania) =

Mountain in Pennsylvania, United States

- Location within Pennsylvania

Highest point
- Elevation: 1,634 ft (498 m) NAVD 88
- Prominence: 315 ft (96 m)
- Parent peak: Dan’s Pulpit
- Coordinates: 40°36′46″N 75°54′41″W

Geography
- Location: Berks County, Pennsylvania, U.S.
- Parent range: Blue Mountain
- Topo map: USGS Hamburg

Climbing
- Easiest route: Appalachian Trail from Hamburg Reservoir (hike)

The Pinnacle is local high point on the Blue Mountain ridge of the Appalachian Mountains. Due to its location on the Appalachian Trail, and its reputation as one of the best views in Pennsylvania, the Pinnacle is heavily used by hikers.

There is a tradition on The Pinnacle for hikers to bring a rock up the trail with them, and deposit it at a large rock pile behind the lookout.
