= Hawk Mountain =

Mountain ridge in the Appalachian Mountain chain

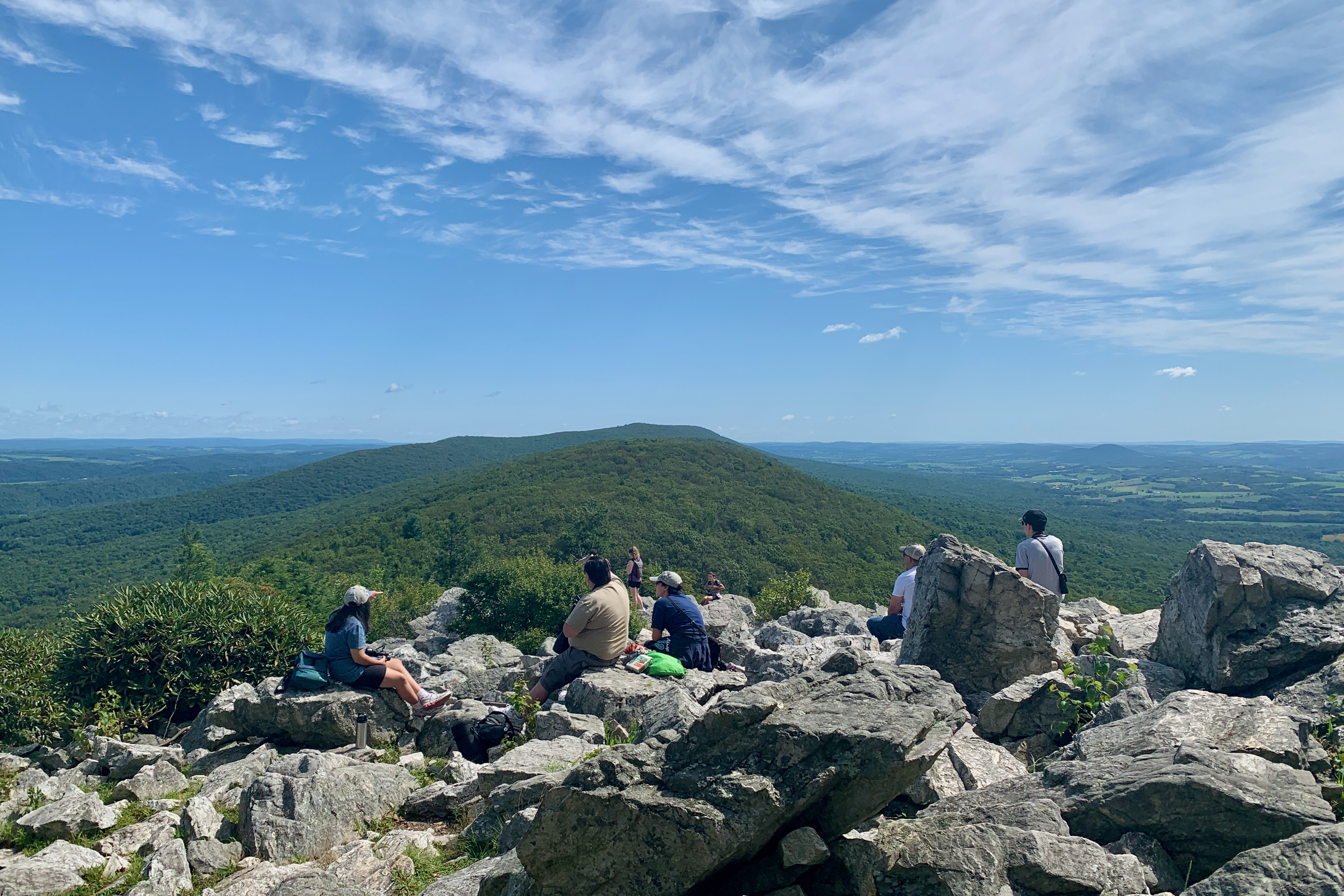
- View of Hawk Mountain from Hawk Mountain Sanctuary's North Lookout in Pennsylvania

Highest point
- Elevation: 1,521 ft (464 m)
- Prominence: 181 ft (55 m)
- Parent peak: The Pinnacle
- Coordinates: 40°38′44″N 75°58′48″W

Geography
- Location within Pennsylvania Location within the United States
- Location: Berks / Schuylkill counties, Pennsylvania, U.S.
- Parent range: Blue Mountain
- Topo map: USGS New Ringgold

Climbing
- Easiest route: Lookout Trail (hike)

Hawk Mountain is a mountain ridge, part of the Blue Mountain Ridge in the Appalachian Mountain chain, located in central-eastern Pennsylvania near Reading and Allentown. The area includes 13,000 acres (5,300 ha) of protected private and public land, including the 2,600-acre (1,100 ha) Hawk Mountain Sanctuary.

The River of Rocks is visible and accessible from the Sanctuary. The boulders were formed by periglacial processes in the Pleistocene epoch, or "ice age".

== History ==
The mountain was previously called North Mountain because it is across the Lehigh Valley from South Mountain. In 1929, the Pennsylvania Game Commission offered hunters $5 for every goshawk shot during migrating season, as the birds were considered pests.

In 1932, Richard Pough (a birder and photographer from Philadelphia) photographed hundreds of killed hawks and published these photos in Bird Lore, the predecessor to Audubon.

In 1934, after decades of hawk and eagle slaughter on the ridge, Rosalie Edge unilaterally ended the annual shoot by buying the property, changing the name of the mountain to the present one, and turning it into a sanctuary. Hawk Mountain Sanctuary was incorporated in 1938 and began year-round operations in 1946.

The Game Commission bounty was terminated in 1951, although birds of prey continued to face threats, including from chemical pesticides like DDT. Bird counts have been taken at Hawk Mountain since the end of World War II, with the Sanctuary counting its millionth raptor on October 8, 1992.

== Scouting and Civil Air Patrol ==
The mountain is also home to the Hawk Mountain Council and Hawk Mountain Camp and the Civil Air Patrol's Colonel Phillip Neuweiler Ranger Training Facility known as the Hawk Mountain Ranger School.

== Gallery ==
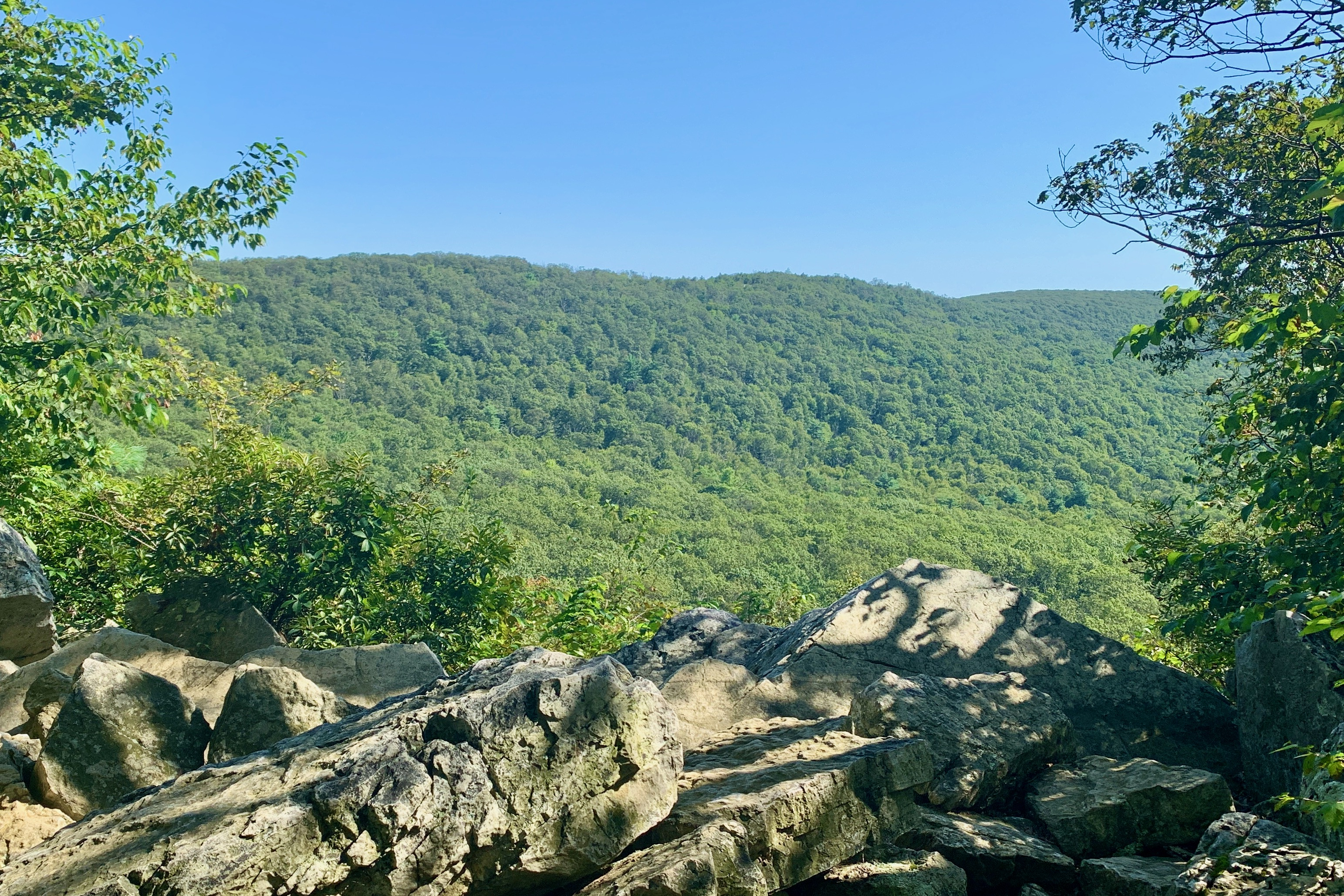
Hawk Mountain viewed from a rocky overlook at Hawk Mountain Sanctuary

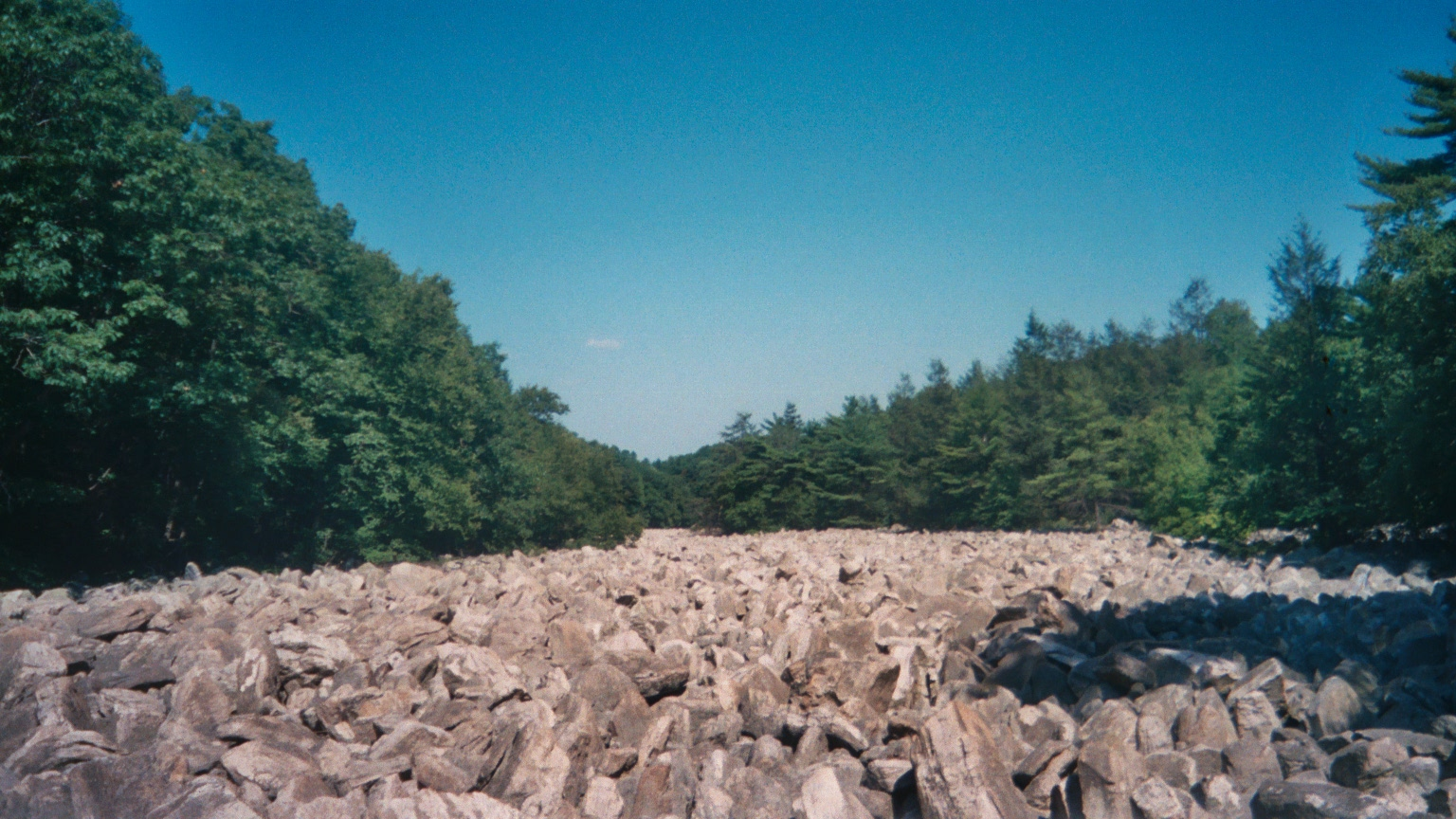
River of Rocks
