= List of people from New Haven, Connecticut =

This is a list of notable natives and long-term residents of New Haven, Connecticut, in alphabetical order.

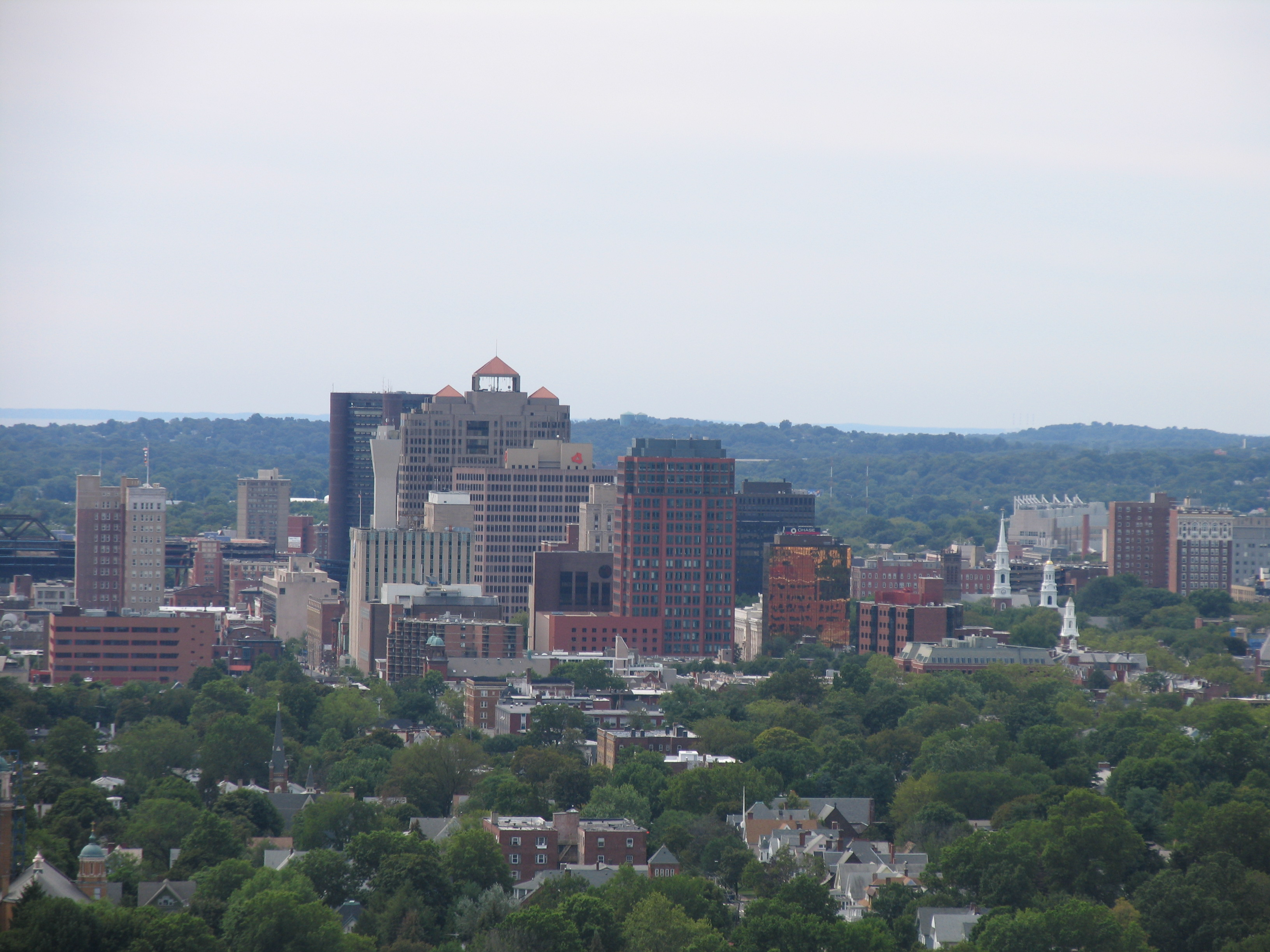
New Haven, seen from East Rock

== Academics and educators ==
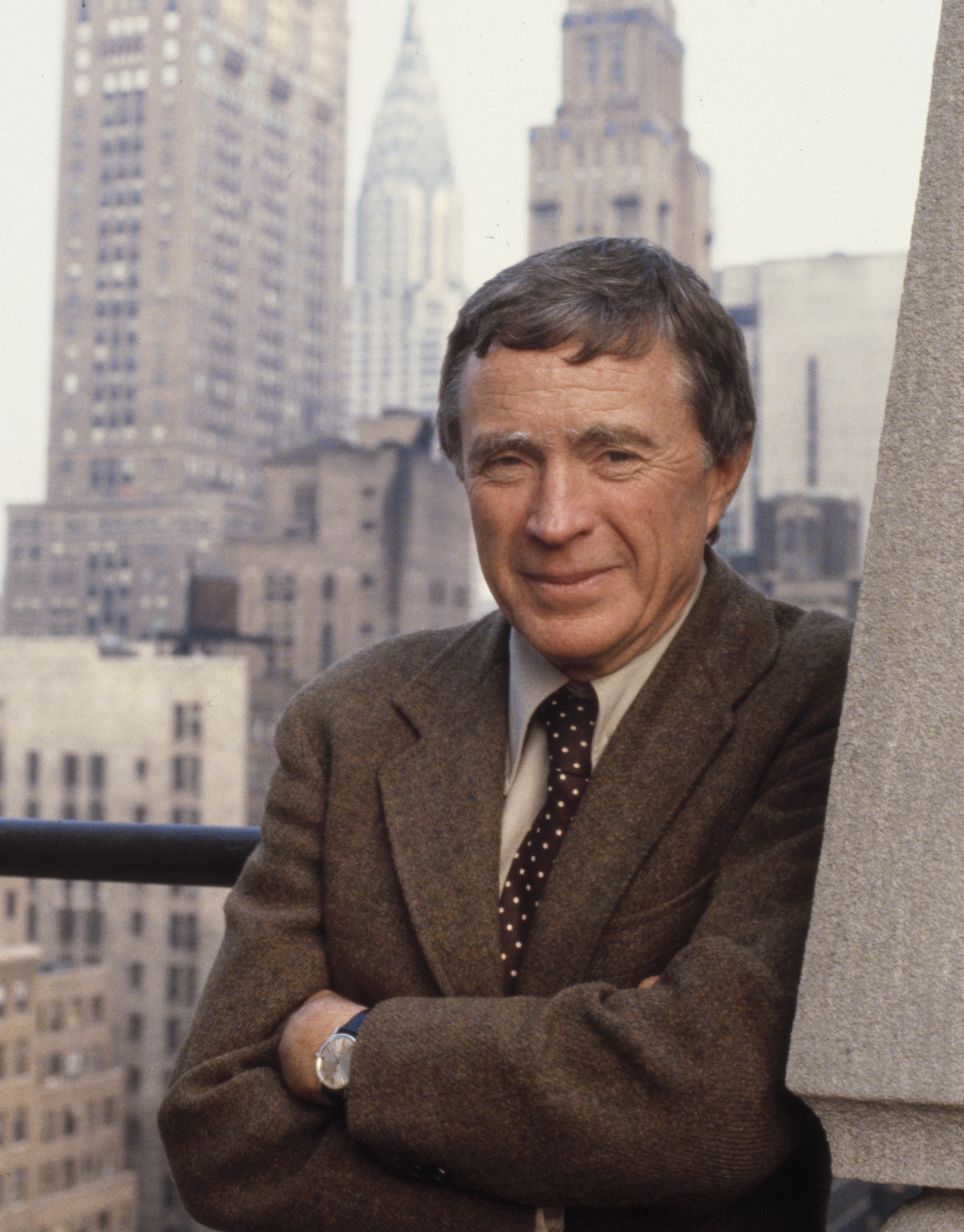
Vincent Scully

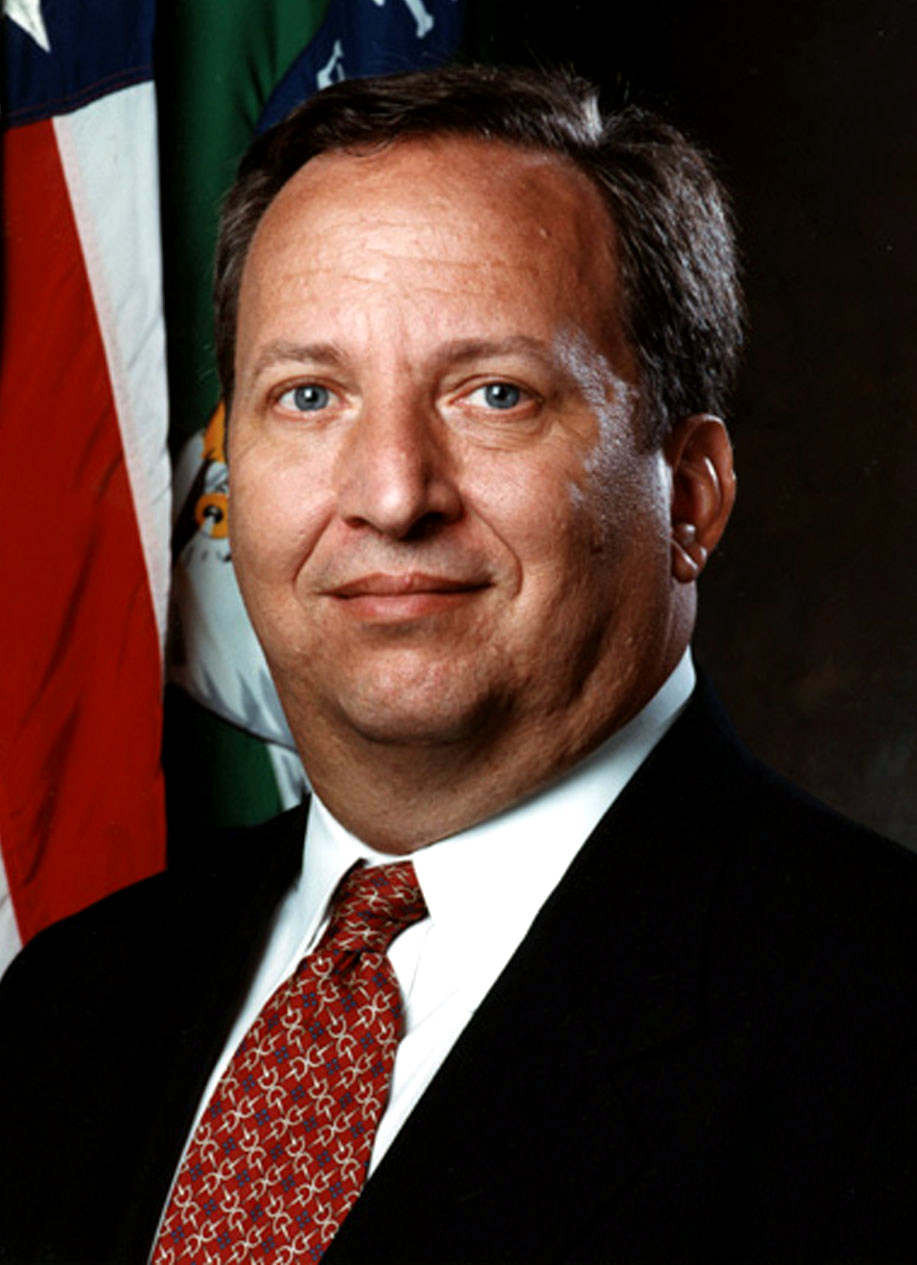
Lawrence Summers

- Michael L.J. Apuzzo, academic neurosurgeon, surgical pioneer, editor, and educator
- Walter Darby Bannard, abstract painter and University of Miami professor
- Ida Barney, astronomer
- Harold Bloom, literature scholar and professor
- Edward Bouchet, physicist and first Black man to receive a Ph.D.
- Raymond C. Bowen, president of LaGuardia Community College
- Thom Brooks, political and legal philosopher
- Benjamin Woodbridge Dwight, educator and author
- Timothy Dwight IV, president of Yale College
- Joseph S. Fruton, biochemist and historian of science
- Josiah Willard Gibbs, mathematical physicist
- Thomas J. Gibson, chancellor of the University of Wisconsin–Milwaukee and the University of Wisconsin–Stevens Point
- Ruth Wilson Gilmore, prison abolitionist and professor at the City University of New York
- William Henry Goodyear, archeologist, art historian and museum curator
- Arthur Twining Hadley, economist and president of Yale University
- Geoffrey Hartman, literature scholar and emeritus professor
- Stephen Kobasa, teacher, writer and Christian political activist
- William Chester Minor, lexicographer and key contributor to the Oxford English Dictionary
- John Nicholas Newman, mathematician
- James Pierpont, founder of Yale College
- David Pingree, professor of mathematics and classics
- Michael Resnik, philosopher of mathematics
- Vincent Scully, author and architecture professor, University of Miami and Yale University
- Lawrence Summers, economist and former U.S. Secretary of the Treasury and Harvard University president
- Peter Vallentyne, professor of philosophy
- Everard Mott Williams, scientist and educator

== Actors, film, entertainers and television ==
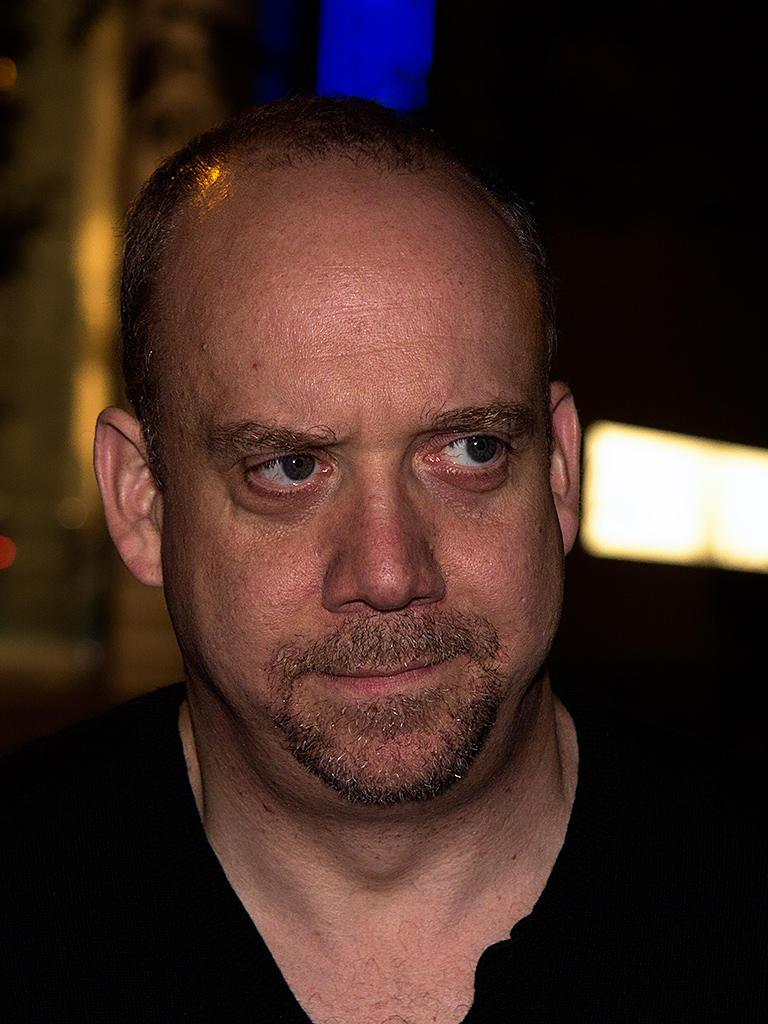
Paul Giamatti

- Lauren Ambrose, actress
- Tony Amendola, actor
- Jack Arnold, film director
- Jessica Blank, actress, playwright and novelist
- Roberts Blossom, actor and poet
- Ernest Borgnine, actor
- Mike Cahill, filmmaker and director
- Melanie Chartoff, actress
- Rod Colbin, actor
- Martha Coolidge, film director
- Daniel Cosgrove, actor
- D. J. Cotrona, actor
- Illeana Douglas, actress, filmmaker and writer
- Jill Eikenberry, actress
- Paul Fusco, puppeteer, actor and creator of ALF
- Kenny Johnson, actor
- Jennifer Getzinger, actress
- Marcus Giamatti, actor
- Paul Giamatti, actor
- Kevin Heffernan, actor
- Adam LaVorgna, actor
- Norman Lear, television producer
- John Bedford Lloyd, actor
- Billy Lush, actor
- Robert Mailhouse, actor
- Biff McGuire, actor
- William Cameron Menzies, film production director and art director
- Peggy Mondo, actress
- Harry Myers, film actor and director
- Becki Newton, actress
- Nolan North, voice actor
- Ron Palillo, actor
- George O. Petrie, actor
- Patricia Smith, actress
- Jennifer von Mayrhauser, costume designer
- Rafer Weigel, actor and sportscaster
- Titus Welliver, actor
- Apollo Smile, born as Paula Ann Schafer, tv personality, dancer, and musician.
- Michael Jai White, actor
- Madeline Zima, actress

== Artists and architects ==
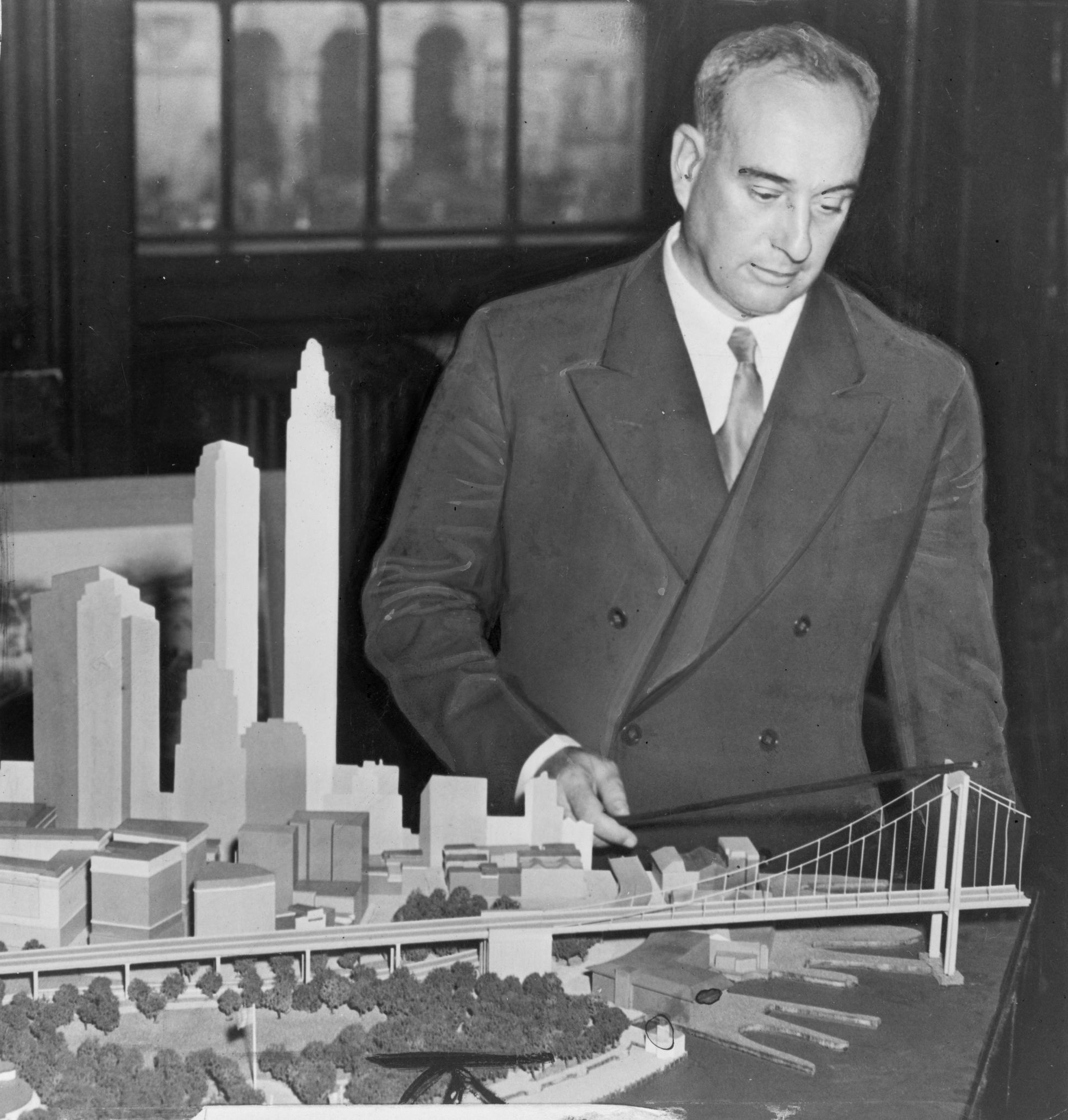
Robert Moses

- Peter Anton, artist and sculptor
- Hezekiah Augur, sculptor and inventor
- Henry Austin, architect
- Paul Wayland Bartlett, sculptor
- Al Capp, cartoonist
- August Geiger, architect
- John Haberle, painter
- Patrick Earl Hammie, painter
- Elizabeth Gilbert Jerome, painter
- Nathaniel Jocelyn, painter
- Damian Loeb, painter
- Mimi Lien, set designer
- Tala Madani, artist
- Robert Moses, architect and urban planner
- Samuel Peck, 19th-century photographer, businessperson
- César Pelli, architect
- Jesse Richards, artist and filmmaker
- Rudi Stern, light artist
- Sidney Mason Stone, architect
- Ithiel Town, architect and civil engineer
- Nicholas Watson, filmmaker and artist
- Urquhart Wilcox, artist, illustrator, and teacher
- Minna Weiss Zellner, artist and print maker

== Athletes and athletics personnel ==
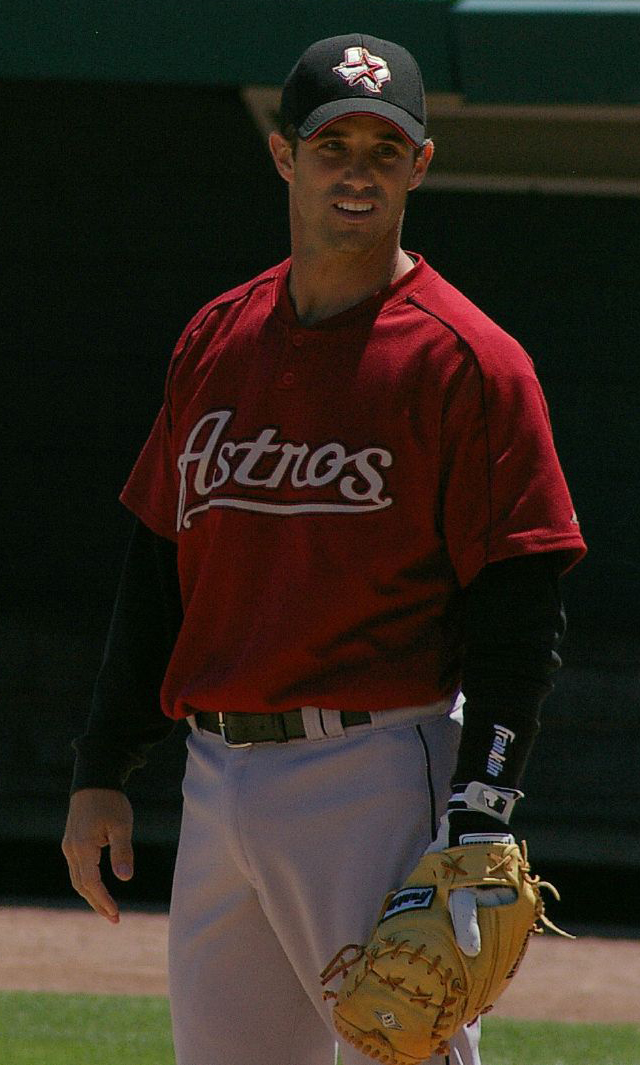
Brad Ausmus

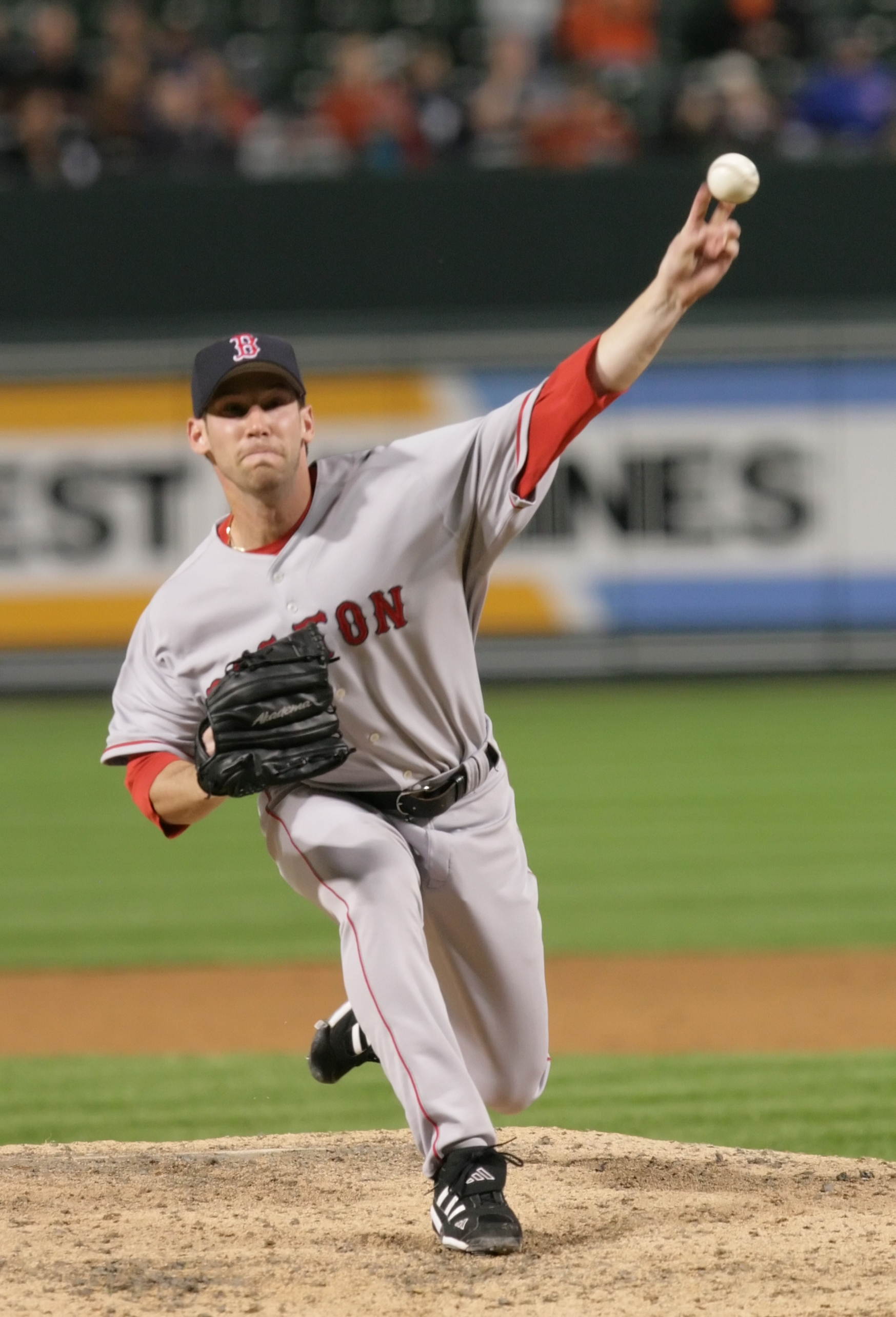
Craig Breslow

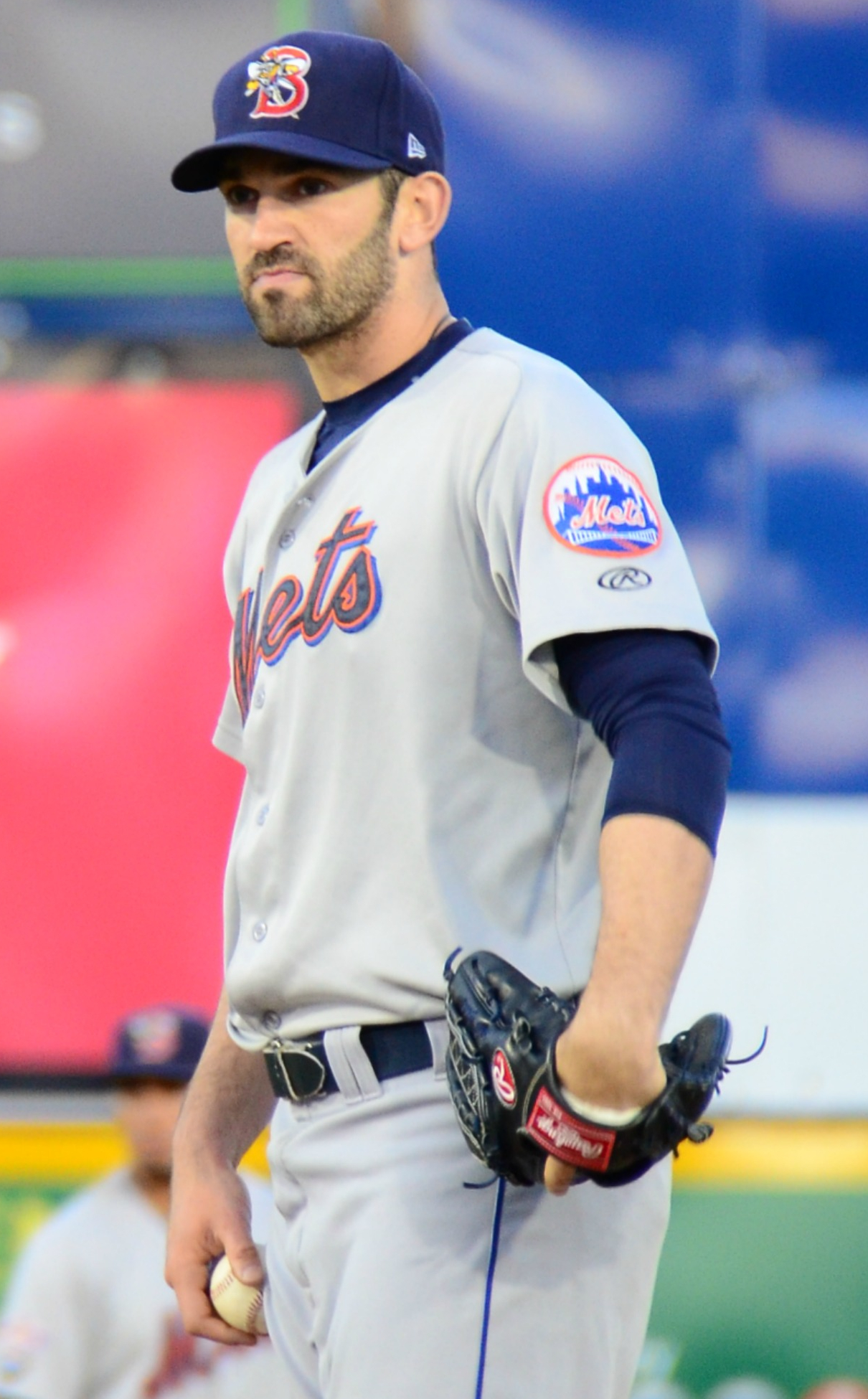
Josh Zeid

- Michael Altieri, pro wrestler performing under the name Mikey Batts
- Brad Ausmus (born 1969), American Major League Baseball catcher and manager
- Frank Beisler, hockey player
- Eric Boguniecki, hockey player
- Albie Booth, football player
- Craig Breslow, baseball pitcher and executive
- Scott Burrell, basketball coach
- Walter Camp, football inventor
- Glenna Collett-Vare, golfer
- Tommy Corcoran, baseball shortstop
- Chad Dawson, boxer
- Harold Devine, boxer
- George Dixon, football running back
- Gardner Dow, football player
- Justin Duberman, hockey right winger
- Ed Ellis, football offensive tackle
- Adam Erne, hockey player
- Ed Etzel, Olympic sports shooter gold medalist
- Harrison Fitch, basketball player
- Kevin Gilbride, football coach
- Fred Goldsmith, baseball pitcher
- Jason Grabowski, baseball player
- Jim Greco, skateboarder
- Adam Greenberg, baseball outfielder
- Stu Griffing, rower
- Anttaj Hawthorne, football defensive tackle
- Jennison Heaton, bobsled racer
- Nate Hobgood-Chittick, football defensive tackle
- Richard Holliday, professional wrestler
- Matt Hussey, hockey centre
- Bill Hutchison, baseball pitcher
- Bob Kuziel, football offensive lineman
- Floyd Little, football running back
- Brian Looney, baseball pitcher
- Ted Lowry, boxer
- Terrell Myers, basketball player
- Mike Olt, baseball player
- Ed Rapuano, umpire
- Anthony Sagnella, football defensive tackle
- Allen Stack, swimmer
- Greg Stokes, basketball player
- Abdou Toure, basketball player
- George Weiss, baseball executive
- Sly Williams, basketball player
- John Williamson, basketball player
- Josh Zeid, American-Israeli baseball player

== Business figures ==
- George Akerlof, economist
- Ted Bates, advertising executive
- Sarah Boone, inventor
- Vinton Cerf, internet pioneer
- Wesley A. Clark, computer scientist and consultant
- Charles Goodyear, inventor and industrialist
- James J. Greco, businessman, was born in town
- Clifford Grodd (1924–2010), president and chief executive of Paul Stuart
- Paul MacCready, aeronautical engineer and inventor
- Andrew Paulson, entrepreneur and media executive
- Roberta Hoskie, real estate broker, writer, and media personality
- John J. Pelley, railroad executive
- Peter Schiff, investment broker, author, financial commentator and CEO of Euro Pacific Capital Inc.
- Alfred Pritchard Sloan Jr., businessman and CEO of General Motors
- Lucius Seymour Storrs, railway official
- Whitney Tilson (born 1966), hedge fund manager, philanthropist, author, and Democratic political activist
- Eli Whitney, inventor and manufacturer
- Steve Wynn, casino developer

== Clergymen ==
- Charles C. Baldwin, chief of chaplains of the U.S. Air Force
- Lyman Beecher, clergyman and abolitionist
- Jonathan Edwards, pastor, theologian, missionary
- William H. Ferris, author, minister and scholar
- Alfred Eaton Ives, 19th-century Congregationalist minister and Maine state legislator
- Michael J. McGivney, founder of the Knights of Columbus

== Lawyers and jurists ==
- Roger Sherman Baldwin, lawyer, Amistad case
- Ellen Bree Burns, judge
- Lubbie Harper Jr., judge
- Marie C. Malaro, lawyer
- Maeve Kennedy McKean, lawyer and health official
- Constance Baker Motley, civil rights activist, judge, and politician
- Neil Thomas Proto, lawyer, teacher, lecturer, and author
- Martin Karl Reidinger, judge
- Thomas Thacher, lawyer
- Portia Wu, lawyer

== Military figures ==
- Timothy I. Ahern, major general
- Benedict Arnold, general who defected to the British
- William P. Cronan, naval officer and Naval Governor of Guam
- Nathan Hale, soldier and spy
- Henry Leavenworth, brigadier general
- Shabsa Mashkautsan, Russian Jewish World War II soldier, Hero of the Soviet Union
- Alfred Judson Force Moody, brigadier general
- Allen L. Seaman, naval officer

== Musicians ==
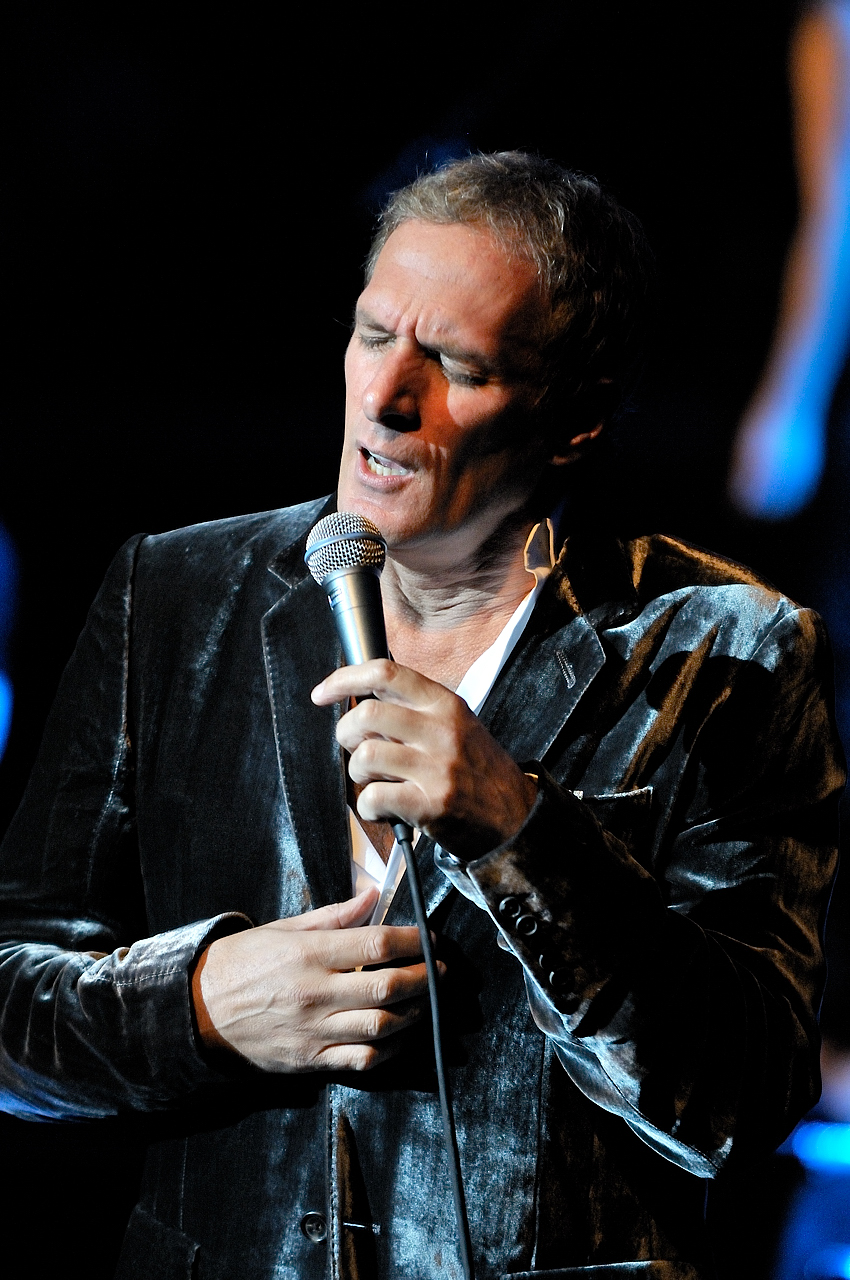
Michael Bolton

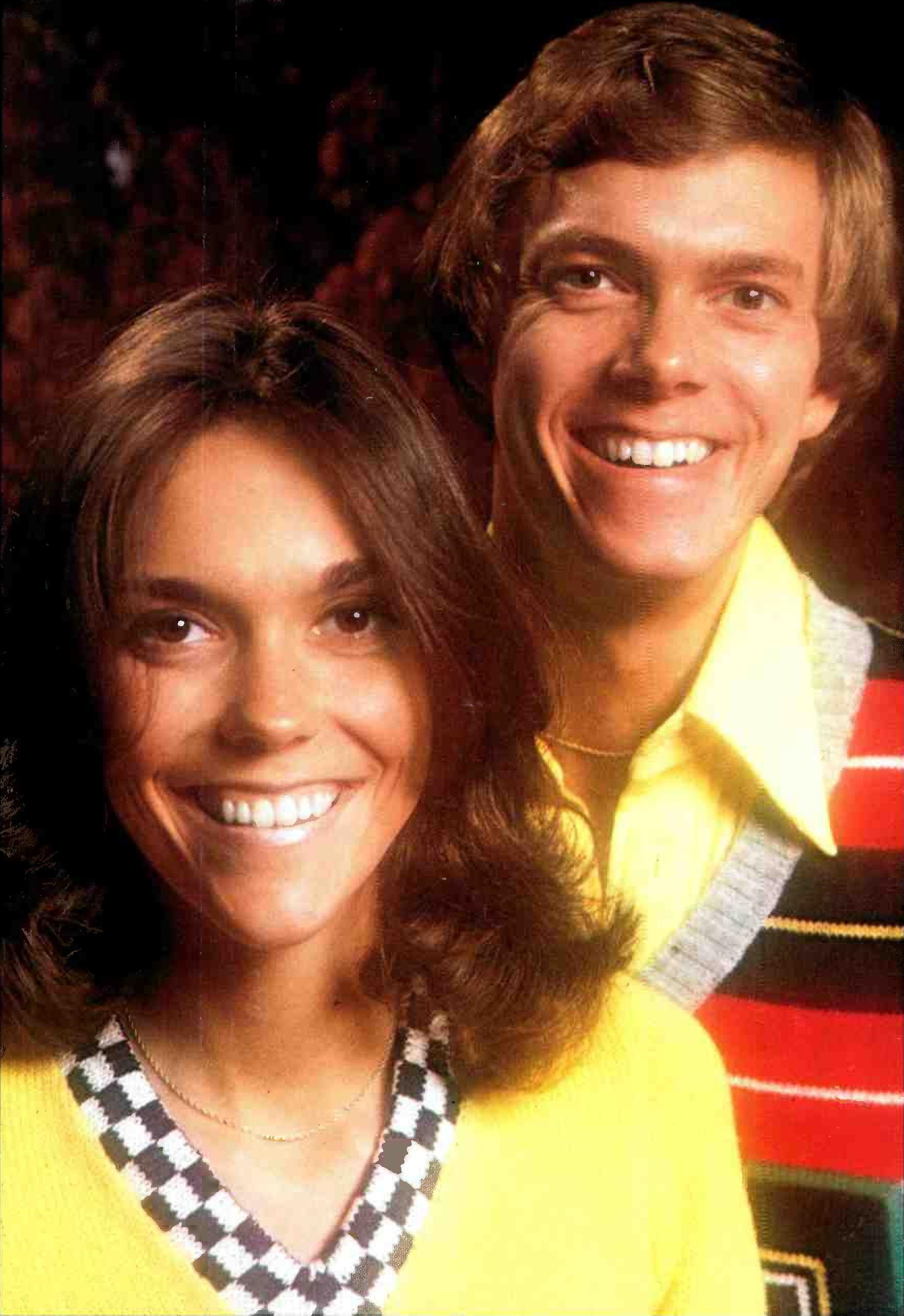
The Carpenters

- Ben Allison, jazz double bass player
- Sonny Berman, jazz trumpeter
- Kath Bloom, singer-songwriter
- Michael Bolton, singer-songwriter
- Andrew Calhoun, folk singer, songwriter
- Karen and Richard Carpenter, singers and musicians
- Loren Mazzacane Connors, musician and artist
- Susan DiBona, composer
- Dominic Frontiere, composer
- Anthony Geraci, blues and jazz pianist
- Jay Greenberg, composer
- Hatebreed, metallic hardcore band
- Gerry Hemingway, jazz percussionist and composer
- Charles Ives, composer
- Michael Gregory Jackson, jazz guitarist
- Jamey Jasta, singer and guitarist
- Kris Jensen, singer and guitarist
- Pete Jolly, jazz pianist and accordionist
- Brooks Kerr, jazz pianist
- Hilly Michaels, musician and drummer
- Joe Morris, jazz guitarist
- Buddy Morrow, trombonist and bandleader
- Alfred Newman, Hollywood composer and conductor
- Troy Oliver, musician, songwriter and producer
- Liz Phair, singer-songwriter and guitarist
- Stacy Phillips, bluegrass artist
- Quincy Porter, composer and music teacher
- Barney Rapp, bandleader and jazz musician
- Kira Roessler, bassist of Black Flag
- Emily Saliers, singer-songwriter and member of the Indigo Girls
- Christian Sands, jazz pianist
- Tony Scherr, bassist and guitarist musician, singer-songwriter and record producer
- Artie Shaw, bandleader
- Stezo, rapper
- Donn Trenner, jazz pianist and arranger
- Jessica Grace Wing, theatrical composer
- Barry Wood, singer and television producer

== Politicians ==
George W. Bush

- Howard S. Baldwin, Arizona state senator and businessman
- Roger Sherman Baldwin, lawyer in the Amistad case, U.S. senator and 17th governor of Connecticut
- George W. Bush, 43rd president of the United States
- Charles R. Chapman, mayor of Hartford, Connecticut and served in both houses of the Connecticut legislature
- Katherine Clark, Democratic House Whip and U.S. congresswoman
- William P. Cronan, naval officer and Naval Governor of Guam
- John C. Daniels, mayor of New Haven
- Mark S. DeFrancesco, member of the Connecticut House of Representatives
- Rosa DeLauro, U.S. representative for Connecticut
- John DeStefano Jr., mayor of New Haven
- Biagio DiLieto, mayor of New Haven
- Andy Dinniman, Pennsylvania state senator
- Jerome F. Donovan, U.S. congressman for New York
- Phineas C. Dummer, 6th mayor of Jersey City, New Jersey
- Henry W. Edwards, 27th and 29th governor of Connecticut
- Foster Furcolo, U.S. congressman and 60th governor of Massachusetts
- Peter Franchot, 33rd comptroller of Maryland
- Henry Baldwin Harrison, 52nd governor of Connecticut
- James Hillhouse, U.S. congressman and U.S. senator for Connecticut
- Thomas Hill Hubbard, U.S. congressman for New York
- Charles Roberts Ingersoll, U.S. congressman and 47th governor of Connecticut
- George Pratt Ingersoll, U.S. ambasaitor to Thailand
- Ralph Isaacs Ingersoll, U.S. congressman and mayor of New Haven
- Joan R. Kemler, first woman to serve as Connecticut state treasurer
- Eleazer Kimberly, in 1696 became secretary of Connecticut Colony; "the first male born in New Haven"
- Richard C. Lee, mayor of New Haven
- Joe Lieberman, Connecticut attorney general, U.S. senator, and 2000 U.S. vice presidential candidate
- William D. Lindsley, U.S. congressman for Ohio
- Frank Logue, mayor of New Haven
- Henry Meigs, U.S. congressman for New York
- Bruce Morrison, U.S. congressman for Connecticut
- George Lloyd Murphy, U.S. senator for California and president of the Screen Actors Guild
- Mary Mushinsky, member of the Connecticut House of Representatives
- Gamaliel Painter, Vermont state legislator
- Henry E. Parker, Connecticut state treasurer
- James P. Pigott, U.S. congressman for Connecticut
- Adam Clayton Powell Jr., U.S. congressman for New York City
- Roger Sherman, first mayor of New Haven, signed the Declaration of Independence and Constitution
- John Todd Trowbridge, member of the Wisconsin Territorial Legislature and sea captain
- Rick Tuttle, Los Angeles city controller
- William H. Yale, 6th lieutenant governor of Minnesota

== Writers ==
- Joseph Payne Brennan, poet and short story writer
- Hermann Broch, novelist
- Noah Charney, novelist and art historian
- William Cronon, environmental historian
- Dorothy Deming, nurse and author
- John Falsey, television writer and producer
- Jeannine Hall Gailey, poet
- William Heffernan, novelist
- Burton J. Hendrick, journalist and writer
- Mary Austin Holley, 19th-century travel writer
- George W. Hotchkiss, 19th-century journalist, editor, historian, and lumber dealer
- Andrew Kopkind, journalist
- Leigh Montville, sportswriter and author
- Ruth Ozeki, novelist
- Themo H. Peel, author and illustrator
- Delia Lyman Porter, author
- Mark de Solla Price, author, journalist and activist
- Margaret Sidney, children's author
- Benjamin Spock, pediatrician and author
- Louisa Caroline Huggins Tuthill (1799–1879), children's book author
- Russell Wangersky, journalist and short story writer
- Leonard Weisgard, children's author and illustrator
- Bernard Wolfe, science fiction writer

== Others ==
- Matt Amodio, Jeopardy! champion
- Michael Buckley, YouTube celebrity
- Perry DeAngelis, co-founder and executive director of NESS, co-founder of podcast The Skeptics' Guide to the Universe
- Scott Fellows, television producer
- Louis Harris, pollster
- Bun Lai, sustainable sushi pioneer of Miya's
- Annie Le, murdered victim on campus of Yale University
- Mary Blair Moody, physician
- Lucy Creemer Peckham, physician, poet
- Frank Pepe, pizza chef
- Madeline Triffon, sommelier
- Vincenzo C. Vannicola, electrical engineer

== See also ==
- List of Yale University people
- List of Hopkins School people
- List of mayors of New Haven, Connecticut
- List of people from Connecticut
- Category:Lists of people from Connecticut by municipality
