= List of Hopkins School alumni =

Following is a list of some of the notable alumni of the Hopkins School in New Haven, Connecticut. This includes alumni from Hopkins in any of its past forms (Hopkins School, Hopkins Grammar School).

== Academia ==
=== College and university presidents and deans ===
- Guido Calabresi (1949) – dean of the Yale Law School; U.S. Court of Appeals judge
- Dale G. Caldwell (1978) – education and religious leader and the first Black president of Centenary University. Currently the Lieutenant Governor and Secretary of State of New Jersey
- Timothy Dwight V (1845) – president of Yale University
- Arthur Hadley (1872) – president of Yale University
- Jonathan Levin (1990) – economist and president of Stanford University
- Abraham Pierson (1664) – first rector of Yale's precursor, the Collegiate School
- Theodore Dwight Woolsey (1816) – president of Yale University

=== Professors ===
- Phoebe C. Ellsworth (1961) – social psychologist and professor at the University of Michigan
- Hanna Holborn Gray (1946) – historian of Renaissance and Reformation political thought and professor of history emerita at the University of Chicago
- Henry Phelps Johnston (1862) – historian of the American Revolutionary War and professor at the City College of New York
- Benjamin Silliman (1833) – early professor of science
- Richard P. Strong (unknown class) – tropical medicine professor at Harvard who did significant work on plague, cholera, bacillary dysentery and other diseases
- Thomas Anthony Thacher (1831) – classicist, college administrator
- Nim Tottenham (1992) – professor of psychology at Columbia University, where she leads the Developmental Affective Neuroscience Laboratory

=== Other ===
- Charles J. Hoadly (unknown class) – librarian and historian who served as State Librarian and director of the Connecticut State Library
- Sherman Day Thacher (1879) – founder of The Thacher School
- John Davenport (n/a) – founder of New Haven, early advocate for the founding of a New Haven grammar school; regarded as Hopkins' founder

== Activists ==
- William Eno (1877) – road safety advocate and inventor
- John Huggins (did not graduate) – Black Power activist, leader of the Black Panther Party

== Art and architecture ==
- George Henry Durrie (unknown class) – landscape painter
- Ernest Flagg (1876) – architect
- William Morris Hunt (1834) – painter
- Henry Murphy (1895) – architect
- Thomas Prichard Rossiter (unknown class) – painter
- Dan Wasserman (1967) – political cartoonist

== Business ==
- Julian Wheeler Curtiss (unknown class) – president of the Spalding sports equipment company and a pioneering promoter of golf in the United States
- Louis R. Ehrich (unknown class) – businessman, art dealer, and politician
- Henry Farnam (1870) – railroad president
- John Geanakoplos (1971) – economist
- George G. Haven, Jr. (unknown class) – businessman
- Henry Coit Kingsley (unknown class) – director of the Cleveland and Pittsburgh Railroad Company

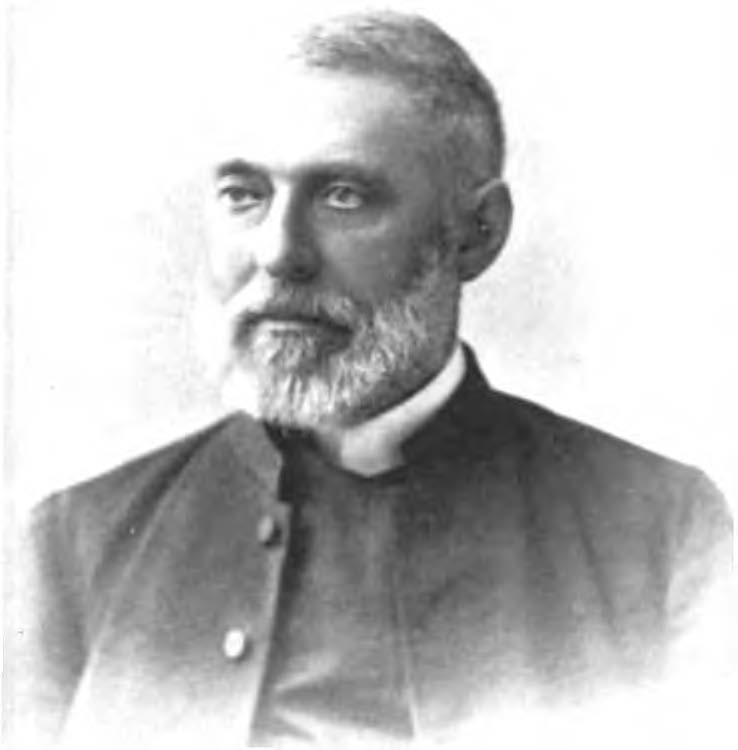
Bishop Thomas Frederick Davies, Sr.

== Clergy ==
- Chauncey Bunce Brewster (1864) – Episcopal bishop
- Benjamin Brewster (1878) – Episcopal bishop of Maine
- Thomas Frederick Davies, Sr. (1849) – third bishop of the Episcopal Diocese of Michigan
- Asa Drury (n/a) – rector of Hopkins from 1829 to 1831
- John Punnett Peters (1868) – Episcopal clergyman, archaeologist, professor, author

== Entertainment ==
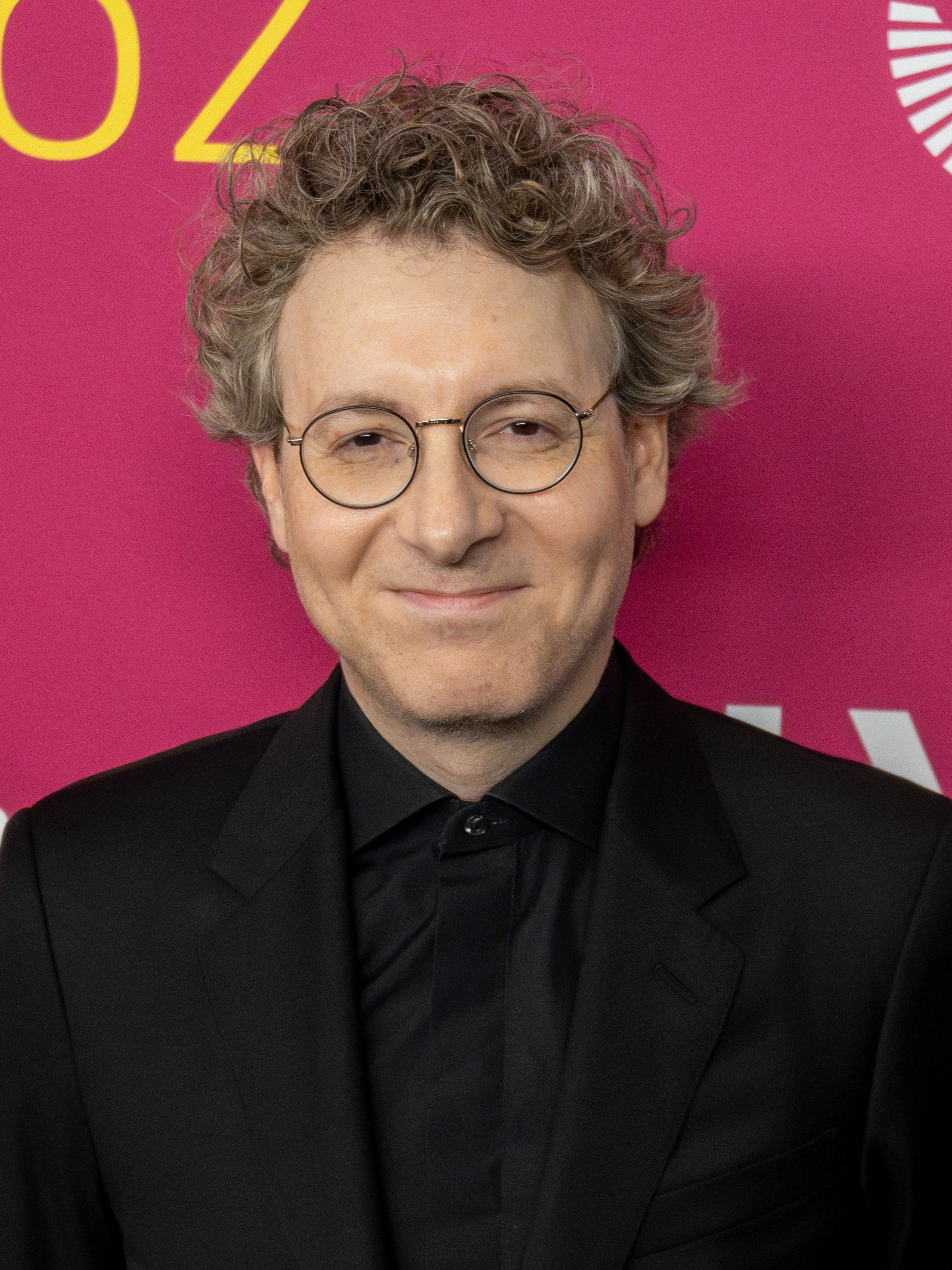
Nicholas Britell

- Nicholas Britell (1999) – Primetime Emmy Award-winning film composer, pianist, and film producer
- George DiCenzo (1958) – actor, arts activist
- Alexander DiPersia (2000) – film actor
- Henry Durand (1877) – songwriter of Yale alma mater, "Bright College Years"
- Marcus Giamatti (1980) – actor, musician, writer and director; best known for starring in the CBS drama series Judging Amy
- Charles Ives (1894) – classical composer and insurance executive
- Justin Kutcher (1998) – sports commentator
- Scott Lowell (1983) – actor, best known for Queer as Folk
- Jonathan Mostow (1979) – film director, writer, and producer
- Harry Rowe Shelley (1876) – composer, organist, music professor
- Samantha Vinograd (class of 2001) – national security analyst at CNN
- Dick Wingate (1970) – music industry and digital entertainment executive

== Law ==
- Henry Baldwin (1793) – U.S. Congressman, Associate Justice of the Supreme Court of the United States
- Horace R. Buck (1872) – justice of the Montana Supreme Court
- William S. Case (1881) – associate justice of the Connecticut Supreme Court from 1919 to 1921
- Marc Kasowitz (1970) – trial lawyer and partner of the law firm Kasowitz Benson Torres; former personal outside attorney of U.S. President Donald Trump
- Sarah A. L. Merriam (1989) – attorney serving as a United States circuit judge of the United States Court of Appeals for the Second Circuit
- Benjamin Matthias Nead (1866) – historian, author, newspaper editor, lawyer, and politician
- Edwards Pierrepont (1833) – New York Supreme Court justice; Minister Plenipotentiary to Great Britain; United States Attorney General
- Morris Woodruff Seymour (1862) – historian, judge, and attorney
- Thomas Thacher (1867) – lawyer
- James D. Torreyson (unknown class) – eighth attorney general of the U.S. state of Nevada
- Ansley Wilcox (1870) – lawyer, civil service reform commissioner, New York political insider and close friend of Theodore Roosevelt
- Ben Wizner (1989) – lawyer, writer, and civil liberties advocate with the American Civil Liberties Union; lead attorney of NSA whistleblower Edward Snowden

== Literature and journalism ==
- Lincoln Caplan (1968) – author, scholar, and journalist
- John Denison Champlin Jr. (1852) – nonfiction writer and editor
- Mei Chin (1993) – novelist and food critic
- Elisha Cooper (1989) – author and illustrator
- Nicholas Dawidoff (1981) – author
- Trey Ellis (1980) – novelist
- Chauncey Goodrich (1804) – editor of the Webster's Dictionary
- Frederick E. Goodrich (unknown class) – journalist and political figure who worked for The Boston Post for fifty-four years
- Clare Morgana Gillis (1994) – journalist; former hostage of the Libyan Civil War
- Carolyn Hax (1984) – advice columnist for the Washington Post
- C.E. Poverman (1962) – fiction author
- Marrion Wilcox (1874) – author and editor
- Theodore Winthrop (1841) – author

== Military ==
- George W. Baird (1859) – US army officer; recipient of the Medal of Honor
- Frederick H. Dyer (unknown class) – drummer boy in the Union Army during the American Civil War
- Joseph Mansfield (1817) – American Civil War major general
- William Chester Minor (1902) – Army surgeon, psychiatric patient, and lexicographical researcher
- Alfred Terry (1838) – American Civil War major general, military commander of the Dakota Territory

== Politics ==
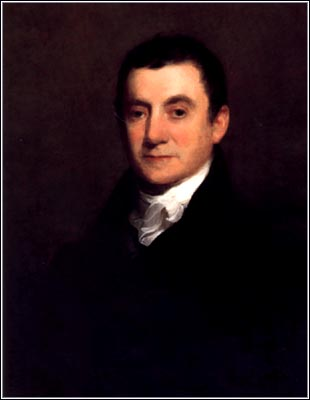
Henry Baldwin

=== Governors ===
- Roger Sherman Baldwin (class of 1807) – U.S. Senator, Governor of Connecticut
- Simeon E. Baldwin (1857) – chief justice of the Connecticut Supreme Court, governor of Connecticut
- Henry W. Edwards (1793) – U.S. Congressman, U.S. Senator, and governor of Connecticut
- Edward Hopkins (n/a) – colonial governor of Connecticut, Hopkins' first benefactor
- William Hoppin (1824) – governor of Rhode Island
- William Henry Hunt (1874) – territorial governor of Puerto Rico, federal and state judge

James Hillhouse

=== United States Congress ===
- Henry Baldwin (1793) – U.S. congressman, Associate Justice of the Supreme Court of the United States
- Augustus Brandegee (1845) – member of U.S. House of Representatives
- Orris Ferry (1840) – U.S. congressman, Senator
- James Hillhouse (1769) – U.S. congressman, Senator
- Selden Palmer Spencer (1880) – United States senator for Missouri
- William Henry Stiles (1825) – United States representative for Georgia, U.S. chargé d'affaires to Vienna
- James W. Wadsworth (unknown class) – U.S. representative from New York
- Washington F. Willcox (1858) – U.S. representative from Connecticut

=== Diplomats ===
- Julian Gewirtz (2008) – diplomat, historian, and poet; Deputy Coordinator for Global China Affairs at the U.S. Department of State in the Biden administration
- Edward House (1877) – diplomat, political adviser to Woodrow Wilson
- George Pratt Ingersoll (class unknown) – Envoy Extraordinary and Minister Plenipotentiary to Siam

=== Executive branch officials ===
- Wilson S. Bissell (1865) – United States Postmaster General
- Gaillard Hunt (unknown class) – first Department of State Historian
- Harold Hongju Koh (1971) – Assistant Secretary of State for Democracy, Human Rights, dean of the Yale Law School
- Francisco Palmieri (1979) – Assistant Secretary of State for Western Hemisphere Affairs
- John Addison Porter (unknown class) – first person to hold the position of Secretary to the President

=== Other U.S. political figures ===
- Sam Greco (2011) – member of the Florida House of Representatives
- Jared Ingersoll (1762) – delegate to the Continental Congress; signer of the United States Constitution for Pennsylvania; Federalist vice presidential candidate

== Science and technology ==
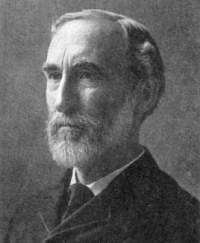
Josiah Willard Gibbs

- Michael L. J. Apuzzo (1957) – neurosurgeon, editor, futurist
- Jean Bennett (1972) – biomedical engineer
- Edward Bouchet (1870) – physicist, first person of color to earn a Ph.D. from an American university
- Lisa DeAngelis (unknown class) – neuro-oncologist and physician-in-chief and chief medical officer at Memorial Sloan Kettering Cancer Center
- Josiah Willard Gibbs (1854) – father of thermodynamics
- John Hays Hammond (1873) – mining engineer, helped in founding of De Beers
- Paul MacCready (1943) – aeronautical engineer
- John Malone (1959) – telecommunications mogul
- Robert Tuttle Morris (1877) – surgeon and writer
- Newton Morton (1947) – founder of modern genetic epidemiology
- James Davenport Whelpley (unknown class) – physician, author, editor, inventor, and metallurgist

== Sports ==
- Andy Bloch (1987) – professional poker player
- Walter Camp (1876) – founder of modern American football
- Ben Crosby (1888) – college football player and coach
- Jumping Jack Jones (unknown class) – MLB baseball pitcher, dentist and voice trainer
- Spencer Lovejoy (2016) – professional squash player
- Alexis Sablone (2004) – goofy-footed professional skateboarder; competed in the 2020 Tokyo Olympic Games
- Teddy Vlock (2016) – former professional equestrian representing Israel and the United States of America; competed in the 2020 Tokyo Olympic Games and member of the Pritzker family
- Billy Walik – former football wide receiver for the Philadelphia Eagles (NFL)
- Ben Washburne (2019) – 2024 Paralympics silver medalist for rowing
- Matt Weiss (2001) – football coach who most recently was the quarterbacks coach and co-offensive coordinator for the Michigan Wolverines; served as a coach in multiple capacities for the Baltimore Ravens of the National Football League (NFL)
- Harry Whitney (unknown class) – sportsman, adventurer, and author
