= Greenville County Museum of Art =

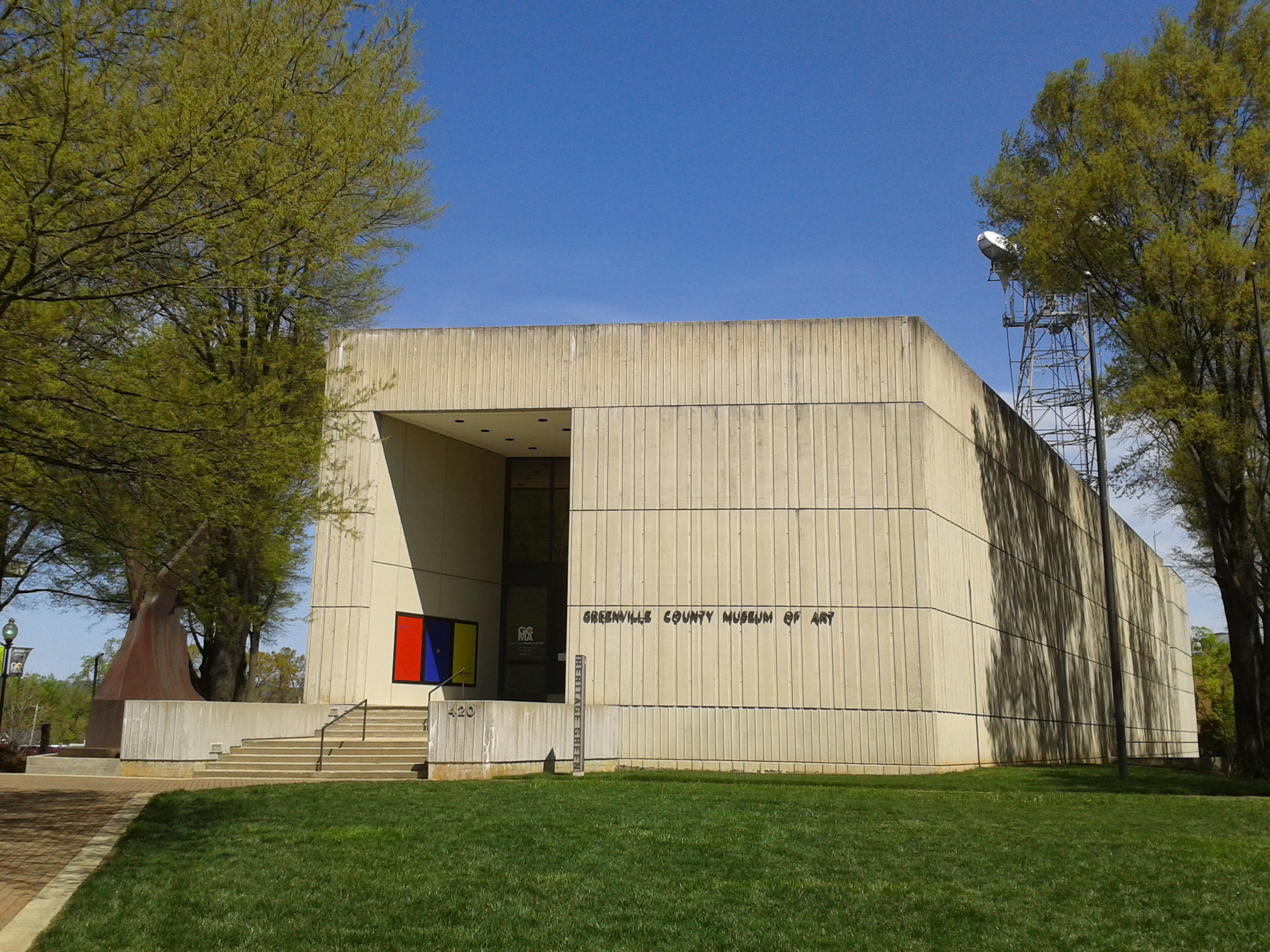
- Greenville County Museum of Art facade, April, 2015
- Location: 420 College Street, Greenville, South Carolina
- Coordinates: 34.8565°N 82.4007°W
- Type: Art museum
- Website: www.gcma.org

The Greenville County Museum of Art (GCMA) is an art museum located in Greenville, South Carolina. Its collections focus mainly on American art, and its holdings include works by Andrew Wyeth, Jasper Johns (raised in South Carolina), William Henry Johnson, Andy Warhol, Romare Bearden, Jacob Lawrence, Alma Thomas, Helen Turner, Charles Willson Peale, Eric Fischl, Marylyn Dintenfass, and Leonardo Drew. Southern American and South Carolina-based artists, such as Elizabeth O'Neill Verner, are also represented.

== History ==
In 1963, the South Carolina General Assembly established the Greenville County Museum Commission. The art association acquired its first permanent home with the purchase of the Gassaway Mansion in 1958. In 1974 GCMA moved into its modernist building. The new building is almost 90,000 square feet for spacious exhibition galleries, a museum shop, art storage, a 190-seat auditorium, and classrooms for studio instruction. In 1973 the American Association of Museums accredited GCMA and renewed accreditation in 1986 and 1998. In 1985, the Museum refined its collections policy to focus on creating a comprehensive survey of American art using southern related examples. In 1995 the GCMA published a book, The Southern Collection, which includes 126 essays about 146 different works in the collection. The Greenville County Museum of Art is one of 55 museums in South Carolina fully accredited by the Alliance of American Museums, a rigorous benchmark. The American Alliance of Museums awarded accreditation to the Museum first in 1973 and subsequently renewed accreditation in 1986, 1998, and 2009.

== Exhibitions and collections ==
The museum is nationally known for three collections: the Southern Collection, a survey of American art using southern-related examples; Andrew Wyeth: The Greenville Collection; and a collection of contemporary art unrivaled in the state.

The museum's “Southern Collection” explores the breadth of American art and history through the Southern experience from the colonial era to the present. Among the highlights are a group of pre-Civil War vessels created by African-American potter and poet David Drake, a collection of American Impressionism, and an array of works by 20th-century masters like Georgia O’Keeffe, Romare Bearden, Merton Simpson, and Andy Warhol. The GCMA is home to an important collection of modernist 47 works by South Carolina native African-American artist William H. Johnson. The museum boasts individual works by such twentieth-century masters as George Bellows, Mary Cassatt, Josef Albers, and Philip Guston. The collection includes 117 works by Jasper Johns, 77 by Stephen Scott Young, and 88 by Andrew Wyeth.

The GCMA is home to the largest and most complete collection of Wyeth watercolors owned by any public museum in the world. Andrew Wyeth himself wrote in a letter dated March 6, 1998, “The Greenville County Museum now has what I consider the very best collection of my watercolors in any public museum in this country”. By virtue of a tax millage, GCMA operations are supported by Greenville County, while program support comes from private sources.

In 2021, the museum sparked controversy when it deaccessioned the Alma Thomas painting Alma's Flower Garden, selling it in a private transaction to an unidentified buyer for $2.8 million. The museum had purchased the painting in 2008 for $135,000. Jonathan Walz, a curator of the upcoming national Alma Thomas exhibit in which the painting was to be included, said "It's particularly important that Alma Thomas’ work, as the work of an African-American artist, be available for the public to see," and "If it has gone into a private collection, that's devastating." Arts writer Lee Rosenbaum criticized the sale as opaque, and depicted it, with similar sales by other museums, as a "professionally misguided strateg[y] of selling important works—among their highest-valued, by price, popularity and/or art historical importance—to reap the most money for current spending priorities, while leaving big holes in their collections."

== Visiting GCMA ==
Although Greenville County taxpayers support the museum's operations and building maintenance, no public funds are provided for art purchases. The Greenville County Museum of Art is open Wednesday through Sunday.

== See also ==
- List of museums in South Carolina
