= John Putnam =

John Putnam may refer to:

- John Putnam (comics), art director and designer of Mad magazine
- John Bishop Putnam, treasurer and director of the book publishing firm G.P. Putnam & Sons.
- John Day Putnam, member of the Wisconsin State Assembly
- J. Pickering Putnam, American architect and designer
- John Putnam (c. 1580–1666), founder of the colonial American Putnam family
