= Game chicken =

Game chicken or Game Chicken may refer to:

- The Gamecock or game fowl, chickens bred for cockfighting
- A Game Chicken, a lost silent film from 1922
- Hen Pearce (1777–1809), English bare-knuckle prizefighter
