= Stephen Scott Young =

American artist

"Study for Allamanda Lane," Watercolor on paper, 1992

Stephen Scott Young (b. 1957 Honolulu, Hawaii) is an American artist best known for his watercolor paintings and etchings that depict everyday life on the east coast of the United States and the Out Islands of The Bahamas. Often painting genre scenes of quotidian life, Young's work is noted for his strikingly realist use of watercolor and eloquent simplicity of subject matter done in the American realist tradition. Young's copperplate etchings evidence a strident attention to detail and intricacy that suggest the influence of Rembrandt and Whistler. Though the images he creates are often nostalgic, his work deals with contemporary issues. Art historian Henry Adams wrote of Young in the late 1980s: "He is like one of those prospectors who has gone back to the tailings of an abandoned mine and where others saw only useless rocks found quantities of untapped, undiscovered gold." He has been exhibited nationally and internationally, and has work in major American museums, including the Cleveland Museum of Art, the Greenville County Museum of Art, Montgomery Museum of Fine Arts and the Kemper Museum of Contemporary Art.

== Biography ==
Young's first interest in art arrived during his childhood when his mother gave him picture books of Caravaggio and Vermeer to copy. When he was fourteen years old, his family moved to Gainesville, Florida. Young attended the Ringling College of Art and Design in Sarasota, Florida, where he was trained in printmaking and began to paint with watercolor. In 1985, Young won first prize in a national art competition held by American Artist magazine. Soon after, he traveled to the islands of the Bahamas, which he has been depicting since. In addition to the Bahamas, Young has painted rural scenes of everyday life from the coastal northeast and southern United States, especially Vermont, Florida, and the Carolinas.

"Pierre," copperplate etching, 1998

In May 2012, Young began exhibiting a retrospective of the past twenty-five years of his career painting the Bahamas. The opening at Christie's in New York City coincided with the publication of Once Upon an Island: Stephen Scott Young in the Bahamas by art historian William H. Gerdts.

Young is referred to as "the Winslow Homer of his day," with high-demand work.

He has been described as "A virtuoso realist in the classic tradition," and "an anomaly on the modern scene."

Young has been married since 1981 to Annette Farrington, who was a fellow art student at Ringling College of Art and Design in Sarasota, Florida. Farrington is a seventh-generation descendant of Bahamian settlers. The couple has two daughters.

== Etchings and silverpoint drawings ==
In addition to painting, Young has contributed a significant part of his career to developing the technique of etching and silverpoint drawing. Trained in printmaking at the Ringling School of Art and Design, Young keeps a press in his Florida studio.

In 2007, Young had his first solo etchings exhibition at the Montgomery Museum of Fine Arts in Montgomery, Alabama.

In 2012, Young exhibited etchings in Adelson Galleries Boston's Post War Works on Paper show.

== Selected bibliography ==
Gerdts, William H. (2012). Once Upon an Island: Stephen Scott Young in the Bahamas. New York: Adelson Galleries.

== Solo exhibitions ==
2013 – "New Works by Stephen Scott Young," Morris and Whiteside Galleries, Hilton Head, SC
2012 – "Stephen Scott Young: I'll Be Your Witness," Greenville County Museum of Art, Greenville, SC
2012 – "Freedom: The Art of Stephen Scott Young," Christie's New York in association with Adelson Galleries, New York, NY
2009 – "In the Copper: Etchings by Stephen Scott Young", Shuptrine Fine Art Gallery, Chattanooga, TN
2008 – "Stephen Scott Young, En Pointe!" Shuptrine Fine Art Gallery, Chattanooga, TN
2007 – "Stephen Scott Young, A Master Among Us" Montgomery Museum of Fine Arts, Montgomery, AL in association with Shuptrine Fine Art.
2005 – "Remix: Stephen Scott Young," Greenville County Museum of Art, Greenville, SC
2004 – "A View from the Bahamas," Museum of Art Fort Lauderdale, Ft. Lauderdale, FL
2004 – "Stephen Scott Young: A Portrait of Greenville," Greenville County Museum of Art, Greenville, SC
1994 – "Stephen Scott Young: In the American Tradition," Jacksonville Art Museum, Jacksonville, FL
1993 – "Stephen Scott Young: In the American Tradition," Museum of Fine Arts, St. Petersburg, FL
1993 – "Stephen Scott Young: In the American Tradition," Arkansas Arts Center, Little Rock, AR
1993 – "Stephen Scott Young: In the American Tradition," The Butler Institute of American Art, Youngstown, OH
1989 – "Stephen Scott Young," Norton Gallery of Art, West Palm Beach, FL
1989 – "Stephen Scott Young," Hunter Museum of American Art, Chattanooga, TN

== Selected group exhibitions ==
2012 – "Post War Works on Paper," Adelson Galleries Boston, Boston, MA
2008 – "Masters of Watercolor: Andrew Wyeth and His Contemporaries," Greenville County Museum of Art, Greenville, SC

== Selected collections ==
Albrecht-Kemper Museum of Art, St. Joseph, MO
Arkansas Art Center, Little Rock, AR
Asian Museum of Watercolor Art, Haikou, Hainan Province, China
Brandywine River Museum, Chadds Ford, PA
Butler Institute of American Art, Youngstown, OH
Cleveland Museum of Art, Cleveland, OH
Greenville County Museum of Art, Greenville, SC
Kemper Museum of Contemporary Art, Kansas City, MO
Montgomery Museum of Fine Art, Montgomery, Alabama
Museum of Fine Arts, St. Petersburg, FL
