= Kemper Museum of Contemporary Art =

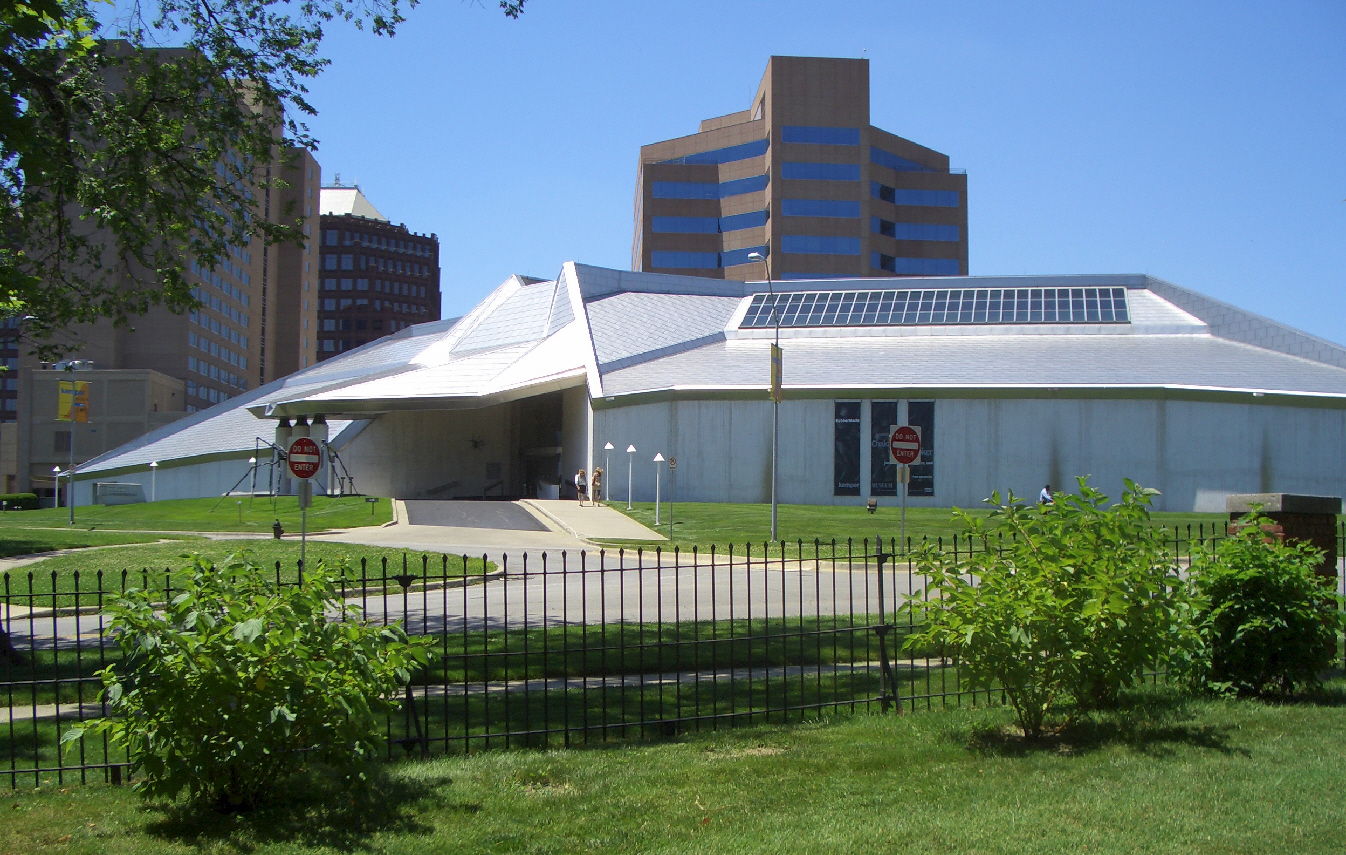
- Established: 1994
- Location: 4420 Warwick Boulevard, Kansas City, Missouri, United States
- Coordinates: 39°2′47″N 94°35′7″W
- Type: Art museum
- Website: www.kemperart.org

Kemper Museum of Contemporary Art opened in 1994 in Kansas City, Missouri. With a $5 million annual budget and approximately 75,000 visitors each year, it is Missouri's first and largest contemporary museum.

== Founders ==
The core of the museum's permanent collection is the Bebe and R. Crosby Kemper Jr. Collection, a gift of the museum's founders. In May 2013, both Kempers stepped down from museum board of trustees, with their daughter, Mary Kemper Wolf, becoming the chairman of the board. R. Crosby Kemper Jr. died in 2014.

== Collection ==
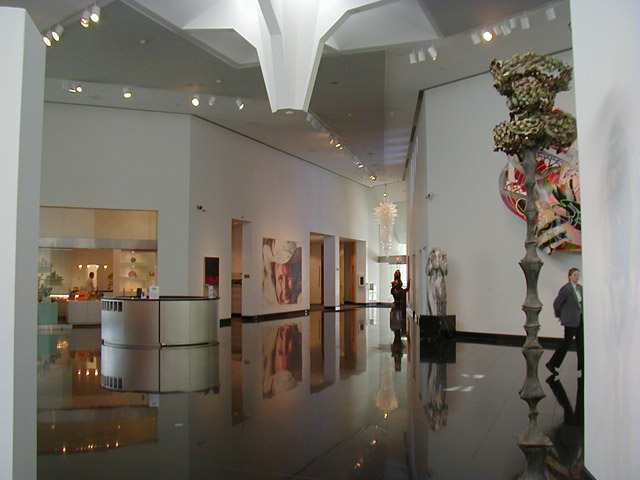
Some of the Kemper's collection, 2005

The Kemper Museum permanent collection includes more than 1,400 works created after the 1913 Armory Show to works by present-day artists. Artists in the permanent collection include Jackson Pollock, Willem de Kooning, Robert Motherwell, Robert Rauschenberg, Jasper Johns, Jim Dine, Tom Otterness, Helen Frankenthaler, David Hockney, Bruce Nauman, William Wegman, Nancy Graves, Dale Chihuly, Arthur Dove, Louise Bourgeois, Andrew Wyeth, Fairfield Porter, Georgia O'Keeffe, Frank Stella, Lesley Dill, Romare Bearden, Christian Boltanski, Robert Mapplethorpe, Garry Winogrand, Barbara Grad, Kojo Griffin, Jim Hodges, Wayne Thiebaud, Peter Anton, Hung Liu, Marcus Jansen, and Stephen Scott Young. In 2000, the museum received 15 works by artists including the photographer Nan Goldin from the collection of Peter Norton. Along with the collection, the museum also maintains a schedule of self-organized and traveling exhibitions. Each year, the museum presents 10–12 special exhibitions in its galleries.

The museum opened in 1994 with an exhibition of rare early series of 28 watercolors by Georgia O'Keeffe, known as the "Canyon Suite" (1916–1918), that had never been shown publicly as a group. In 1999, the paintings' authenticity was challenged because the paper used for some of them could not have been obtained in the United States from 1916 to 1918, when O'Keeffe taught art at West Texas State Normal College in Canyon. The National Gallery of Art subsequently excluded the "Canyon Suite" from O'Keeffe's catalogue raisonne, and Gerald Peters Gallery refunded the $5 million that the Kemper Museum paid for them.

== Architecture ==
Kemper Museum’s 23,200-square-foot concrete, steel, and glass building, constructed from 1992 to 1994 at a cost of $6.6 million, was designed by architect Gunnar Birkerts. The structure has a large central atrium under an articulated skylight. Two wings extend from either side of the atrium. The main gallery hosts three major exhibitions each year. Side galleries present works from the permanent collection in rotation. Works of art are always on view in the atrium and the corridors of each wing. San Francisco Chronicle noted that Birkerts “used concrete, glass and steel in ways that seemed to flow, almost as if shaped by hand”.

=== Oil on Linen ===
Oil on Linen is a restaurant inside the Kemper Museum of Contemporary Art, opened in November 2024 by chef and owner Ted Habiger.

The restaurant's menus respond to exhibitions at the museum. Habiger and his culinary team develop dishes in relation to artists and works on view, with the menu changing alongside the museum's exhibition program.

The café gallery retains Frederick J. Brown's The History of Art, an installation of 110 paintings that has been displayed in the restaurant since the museum opened in 1994. Additional contemporary works were curated for the restaurant from the collection of Kansas City collectors Bill and Christy Gautreaux, including works by Sanford Biggers, Ronald Jackson, Annie Lapin, and Joiri Minaya. The space also includes set in place (mis en place), a durational drawing by Kansas City artist Kevin Townsend.

Oil on Linen was developed by Habiger with cultural strategist and curator Tiffany Thompson of Petrichor Projects, who collaborates on its art and culinary programming.
