= Nina Wilcox Putnam =

American dramatist

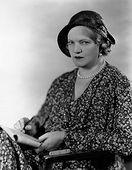
- Putnam, circa 1932
- Born: Inez Coralie Wilcox; November 28, 1888; New Haven, Connecticut, U.S.
- Died: March 8, 1962 (aged 73); Cuernavaca, Mexico
- Occupations: Writer; Novelist; Columnist; Screenwriter; Playwright; Comic
- Spouses: Robert Faulkner Putnam (m. 1907; died 1918); Robert J. Sanderson (m. 1919; div. 1926); Arthur James Ogle (m. 1931; div. 1933); Christian Eliot (m. 1933; died 1948)
- Children: John Francis Putnam

Nina Wilcox Putnam (November 28, 1888 – March 8, 1962) was an American novelist, screenwriter and playwright. She wrote more than 500 short stories, around 1000 magazine articles, and several books in addition to regular newspaper columns, serials, comic books and children's literature. Many of her stories were made into films, including a story that was the basis for the 1932 film The Mummy starring Boris Karloff. She married four times, was estimated to have earned one million dollars from her writing, and drafted the first 1040 income tax form for the IRS.

== Biography ==
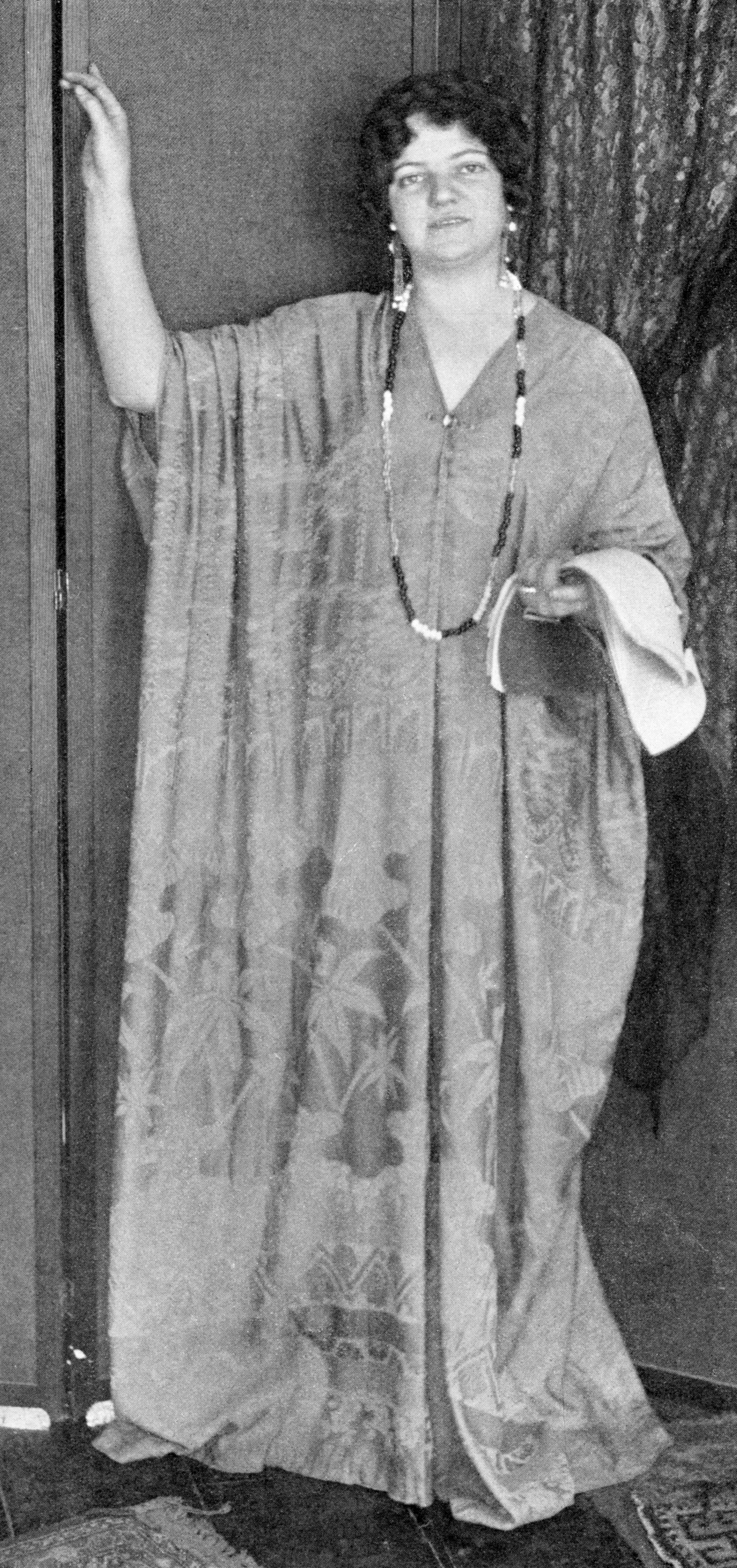
Nina Wilcox Putnam in 1913

Putnam was born Inez Coralie Wilcox in New Haven, Connecticut on November 28, 1888 to Eleanor Sanchez Wilcox and Marrion Wilcox. She was homeschooled by her father, who taught English at Yale and was an editor of Harper's Weekly and the Encyclopedia Americana. She had a sister, Lenor, who was five years younger than she. When Inez was 11 years old, the New York Sunday Herald bought a short story of hers for $5.

Putnam took a job making hats at a Fifth Avenue millinery. She married publisher Robert Faulkner Putnam in 1907, taking his last name. She drafted the first US Income Tax 1040 form for the Internal Revenue Service in 1912. She was diagnosed with tuberculosis and given two years to live, an experience she wrote about in 1922 in the Saturday Evening Post.

Putnam was a prolific writer, penning romances, westerns, musical comedies and Gothic horror. She wrote pieces for The Saturday Evening Post and had a syndicated column called "I and George" that was carried in 400 newspapers. She also wrote children's books and created a comic book series for children called Sunny Bunny. In 1928 or 1929 she began the comic strip Witty Kitty. Putnam was also a vocal advocate for Victorian dress reform, decrying the horrors of corsets and experimenting with her own dress designs.

A 1929 video of Putnam is archived at the University of South Carolina Libraries. In the video Putnam tells jokes and sends greetings from France.

The screenplay for the 1932 film The Mummy starring Boris Karloff was adapted from an original story by Putnam and Richard Schayer. The pair learned about Alessandro Cagliostro and wrote a nine-page treatment entitled Cagliostro. The original story, set in San Francisco, was about a 3000-year-old magician who survives by injecting nitrates. Screenwriter John L. Balderston based his script on the story.

Hollywood made several of Putnam's stories into movies, including Graft, A Game Chicken (1922), The Fourth Horseman, In Search of Arcady, Sitting Pretty, Slaves of Beauty, Two Weeks With Pay, The Beauty Prize, A Lady's Profession (1933) and Golden Harvest. She wrote the screenplay for Democracy: The Vision Restored (1920) and the 1953 film El billetero was adapted from her story. She was estimated to have earned one million dollars from her writing by 1942.

She was the Chairwoman of the Palm Beach County Finnish Relief Fund and she wrote tracts for the Woman's Christian Temperance Union.

Putnam moved to a resort community in Cuernavaca, Mexico, around 1946. After a long illness, the last six years of which she was confined to bed, Putnam died on March 8, 1962.

== Personal life ==
Putnam married New York publisher Robert Faulkner Putnam on October 5, 1907, in New York City. They had a son, John Francis Putnam. Robert Putnam died on October 23, 1918, a victim of that year's flu pandemic. She kept the name Putnam for the rest of her life.

In 1919 she married Robert J. Sanderson of Boston. In 1924, the wife of Putnam's chauffeur-secretary, Richard Ellsworth Bassett, alleged that Putnam had tried to convince her to divorce her husband so that Putnam could marry him. Putnam, who had been pursuing a divorce from Sanderson, denied the charges. She divorced Sanderson in 1926. Her third marriage was to Arthur James Ogle on September 12, 1931, in Yuma, Arizona. In July 1933 she was granted a divorce from Ogle. The day after her divorce, Putnam married Christian Eliot, nephew of Granville John Eliot, 7th Earl of St Germans. Christian died on June 18, 1948.

She had homes in New York, Hollywood, and Delray Beach, Florida, and once purchased a castle in Spain.

== Bibliography ==
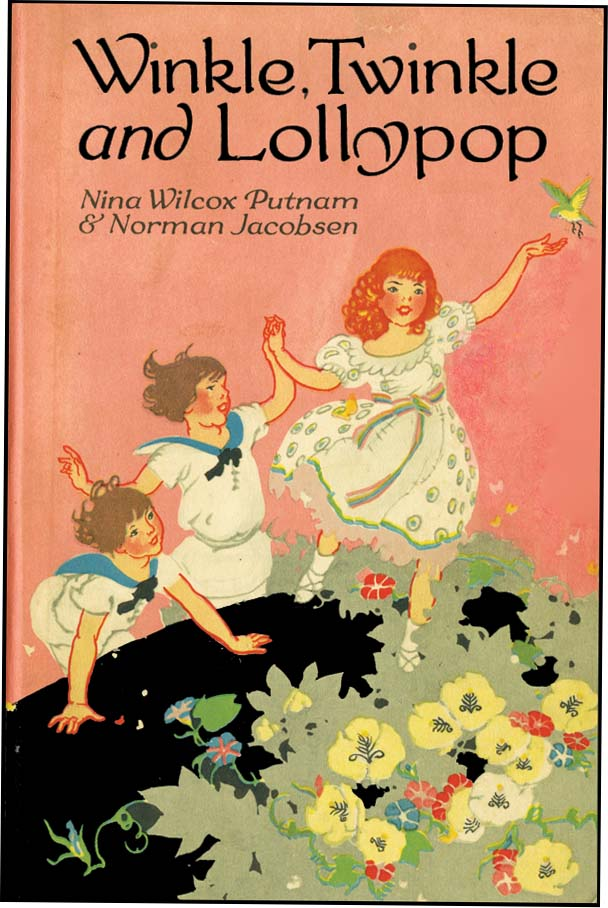
Cover of Winkle, Twinkle and Lollypop (1918)

- —— (1912). In Search of Arcady. Garden City, N.Y.: Doubleday. p. 361.
- —— (1913). The Impossible Boy. Indianapolis: The Bobbs-Merrill company.
- —— (1914). Orthodoxy. New York: Mitchell Kennerley.
- —— (1915). The Little Missioner. D. Appleton and Company.
- —— (1916). Adam's Garden. J.B. Lippincott.
- ——; Jacobsen, Norman (1917). When the Highbrow Joined the Outfit. New York: Duffield & Company.
- —— (1917). Sunny Bunny. Algonquin.
- —— (1918). Esmeralda, or, Every Little Bit Helps. Philadelphia: J.B. Lippincott. p. 172.
- ——; Jacobsen, Norman (1918). The Vulgar Dollar. Saturday Evening Post. August 17, 1918. Reprinted Sep 12, 2018
- ——; Jacobsen, Norman (1918). Winkle, Twinkle and Lollypop. Katharine Sturges Dodge (illust.). P. F. Volland.
- —— (1919). Believe You Me!. New York: George H. Doran.
- —— (1920). It Pays to Smile. New York: George H. Doran. p. 286.
- —— (1921). West Broadway. George H. Doran.
- —— (1922). Laughter limited. New York: A. L. Burt. p. 341.
- —— (1922). Tomorrow We Diet. George H. Doran. p. 90.
- —— (1923). Say It with Bricks: A Few Remarks About Husbands. George H. Doran. p. 33.
- —— (1923). Say It with Oil: A Few Remarks About Wives. George H. Doran. p. 25.
- —— (1926). Easy. Burt. p. 269.
- —— (1930). Laughing through, being the autobiographical story of a girl who made her way. New York: Sears Pub. Co. p. 340.
- ——; Jacobsen, Norman (1935). Adventures in the Open: In which Winkle, Twinkle, and Lollypop discover the elements of the world about them. Katharine Sturges Dodge (illust.). New York: Wise Book Co. p. 112.
- —— (1940). The Inner Voice. New York: Sheridan House. p. 309.
- —— (1950). Lynn, Cover Girl. Messner. p. 186.
- —— (1950). A Career for Lynn. New York: Avon Book Division, the Hearst Corporation. p. 128.
- —— (1962). Second-hand book. Greenwich, Conn.: Fawcett Publications.
