= Marylyn Dintenfass =

American artist

- Born: 1943 (age 82–83)
- Education: Queens College, City University of New York
- Known for: Painting; printmaking; sculpture

Marylyn Dintenfass (born 1943) is an American painter, printmaker, and sculptor. She is primarily known for her oil paintings, which use a dynamic color palette and lexicon of gestural imagery to explore dualities in the human experience and everyday sensual pleasures.

== Early life and influences ==
Marylyn Dintenfass was born in 1943 in Brooklyn, New York and spent most of her early years in Brooklyn and then Long Island. She attended Queens College, and graduated in 1965 with a bachelor's degree in Fine Arts. During this time, the artist worked with Abstract Expressionist painter John Ferren and muralist Barse Miller. Dintenfass explored new media and developed her own reaction to abstract expressionism with color, line, and gesture. Dintenfass acquired an appreciation for a broad range of materials that led to major sculpture installations composed of ceramic materials, steel, lead, wood, wax and a variety of pigments and epoxies.

Following a tour of museums in Amsterdam, Paris and Rome, the artist made her way to Jerusalem in 1966. During this journey, the artist worked with painter Ruth Bamberger, studied etching and mingled with the artists and intellectuals of the city. The result was Dintenfass's first architectural commission, to design the “Pop Op Disco,” Jerusalem's first disco. This commission allowed her to work with an array of materials to employ shapes, surfaces, textures, colors, and lights, all of which coalesced in her consciousness that would become important components of her mature personal visual vocabulary. Dintenfass also married and started her family during these years.

== Work ==
=== Paintings ===
Art critic Meredith Mendelsohn writes, “Dintenfass uses luscious colors, repetitive forms, and a gestural intensity that combines Abstract Expressionism and Pop Art.”

Dintenfass often works with oil paint on wooden panels fragmented into parts of a grid. "After completing a painting," writes curator and critic Lilly Wei in a study of Dintenfass' work, "Dintenfass literally takes it apart, treating each panel as a discrete entity, exchanging panels between works in an aesthetic mix and match as she searches for interactions and relationships of color and form that satisfy her sense of visual excitement, sparked by the frisson of the dissonant." In an interview with critic Irving Sandler, Dintenfass speaks of the grid as a necessary, formal restraint for the passion of the gestural marks it contains. Joyce Robinson illuminates; “Dintenfass is at heart, though, a painter, and the grid, with its reference to and notion of modular parts, has remained central to her artistic enterprise, functioning as a kind of Apollonian matrix holding in check the exuberant, vividly colored abstractions of this essentially Dionysian artist.”

Lilly Wei adds, "Ultimately, however, Dintenfass is more sensualist than theorist, and her paintings owe much of their allure to their materiality and the dazzle of color. Her array of ripe, radiant, saturated hues—a palette of gorgeous diversity—can be silkily smooth and nuanced; boldly exuberant; or edgily, feverishly discordant."

The artist's abstract imagery usually appears in her work as various forms of stripes or circles arranged across translucent layers of alternating matte and high gloss textures. In a conversation with gallery owner, John Driscoll, Dintenfass likens these symbols to language that predates the written word, saying her "work relates to communication through the visceral channel." Rooted in autobiography, the artist's paintings also examine the contrast between what she calls the “micro” and the “macro.” At times the shapes simultaneously resemble cells under a microscope and visions of the cosmos. Dintenfass' themes explore the dualities of everyday pleasures; depending on the focus of a series, her symbols might conjure characters, candies, car wheels, or paint itself.

=== Sculptural Installations ===
Although known for her paintings, Dintenfass was first recognized for her sculptural installations. Her innovative use of mixed media (ceramics, epoxies, wax, pigments, steel, lead, wood, etc.) transformed understanding of what a “ceramic” work of art could be and firmly fixed her position and influence among a generation of mixed media artists expanding the traditional definitions and boundaries of object and materials to create modern art. The results came as architectural reliefs and installation sculptures unique to her organic but structural personal style. Similar to her paintings, Dintenfass developed a modular language of symbols, amalgams of line and curve, which she would combine to create detailed pictographic languages all her own, what she has called “organic alphabets.” As Ted Castle relates, “Ideas are furtive elements, stolen from the matrix, so as to be reformed by human genius into something unforeseen—a poem, a painting, a game of dominoes, a television set, a brick, a tile, a cup. Marylyn Dintenfass is a master of the transformation of ideas into palpable form.”

Dintenfass has also been commissioned to create many large-scale installations, including works for the State of Connecticut Superior Courthouse; the Port Authority of NY 42nd Street Bus Terminal; IBM in Atlanta, Charlotte, and San Jose; The Baltimore Federal Financial Building; Ben Gurion University, Israel; Tagimi Middle School, Japan; and her 2010 project (and largest project to date) in Ft Myers, Florida entitled “Parallel Park.”

"Parallel Park" is a site-specific artwork for the exterior walls of the Lee County Justice Center's Parking Garage encompassing 30,000 square feet (2,800 m^{2}). Dintenfass's images were enlarged to 10 times their original size employing specialized digitizing software resulting in 23 images, each 33 feet (10 m) high x 23 feet (7.0 m) wide and commercially printed with archival ink on Kevlar fabric and installed on all four facades of the parking structure. Each panel transforms the perimeter of the structure, creating a progression of changing images and colorful patterns, all of which are key elements represented in Dintenfass's paintings and drawings. These images and patterns recall architectural friezes, mosaics, and frescoes of the ancient, medieval and Renaissance artists as well as works by early modern artists such as the Synchromists and the Italian Futurists.

== Exhibitions ==
Dintenfass’ work has been included in more than 60 national and international exhibitions and more than a dozen solo shows including the Queens Museum of Art the Katonah Museum, The Greenville County Museum of Art and, at the Mississippi Museum of Art –an exhibition underwritten by the Andy Warhol Foundation. In 2008, her work was included in the inaugural exhibition of the Museum of Arts and Design in New York.

More than 30 public collections hold works by Dintenfass, including the Museum of Fine Arts Houston, Minneapolis Institute of Arts, the Cleveland Museum, The Detroit Institute of Arts, the Smithsonian American Art Museum, and the Metropolitan Museum of Art in New York City.

Dintenfass has twice been a MacDowell Fellow, was awarded a New York Foundation for the Arts Individual Artists Grant, and two National Endowment Project Grants. She was awarded the Silver Medal at the First International Exhibition, Mino, Japan, and the Ravenna Prize at the 45th Concorso Internazionale Della Ceramica D’Arte, Faenza, Italy. She was also a member of the faculty at Parsons School of Design in New York City for ten years. She is included in the recent book 100 New York Painters by Cynthia Maris Dantzig (Schiffer, 2006) and is the subject of Lilly Wei's recently published monograph Marylyn Dintenfass Paintings from Hudson Hills Press.

== Accomplishments and Academia ==
This artist has earned many honors in the art world. In 1983, Dintenfass garnered the Outstanding Achievement Award, Women in Design International Exhibition in San Francisco, CA. In Mino, Japan she was given the 1986 Silver Medal in the First International Exhibition. More recently in 2002–2003, she became a trustee at the Museum of Ceramic Art in New York City. In addition to these honor, Dintenfass has been a MacDowell fellow and a New York Foundation for the Arts Individual Artist Fellow. The National Endowment for the Arts also gave her two project grants. Dintenfass has also become involved in academia. She was a visiting professor at the National College of Art and Design in Norway, Brezel Academy of Art and Design in Israel, Sheridan College in Canada, as well as Hunter College in New York city. Additionally, Dintenfass held a faculty position at Parsons School of Design (New York City) where she worked for 10 years.
