= Henry Phelps Johnston =

Henry Phelps Johnston (1842–1923) was a historian of the American Revolutionary War and professor at the City College of New York.

== Life ==
Johnston was born in Trabzon, Turkey, on April 19, 1842, the son of American missionaries Thomas Pinckney Johnston and Marianne Cassandra Howe. He was educated at Hopkins Grammar School in New Haven, and Yale University, graduating B.A. in 1862. During the American Civil War he enlisted as a private in the 15th Connecticut Infantry Regiment, and was honorably discharged in July 1865 as a second lieutenant. He studied at Yale Law School from 1865 to 1867 and briefly practised as a lawyer in New York before becoming a newspaperman. From 1879 he taught at the City College of New York, retiring in 1916 as emeritus professor. After retirement he moved to Connecticut, dying on February 28, 1923, in the Middlesex Hospital, Middletown.

From 1882 to 1883, he was editor of The Magazine of American History.

With his wife, Elizabeth Kirtland Holmes, he had four sons.

== Writings ==
- The Campaign of 1776 around New York and Brooklyn (1878)
- Observations on Judge Jones' Loyalist History of the American Revolution (1880)
- The Yorktown Campaign (1881)
- Yale and her Honor-Roll in the American Revolution (1888)
- The Battle of Harlem Heights (1897)
- The Storming of Stony Point (1900)
- Nathan Hale, 1776 (1914)
