= Lisa DeAngelis =

American neurooncologist

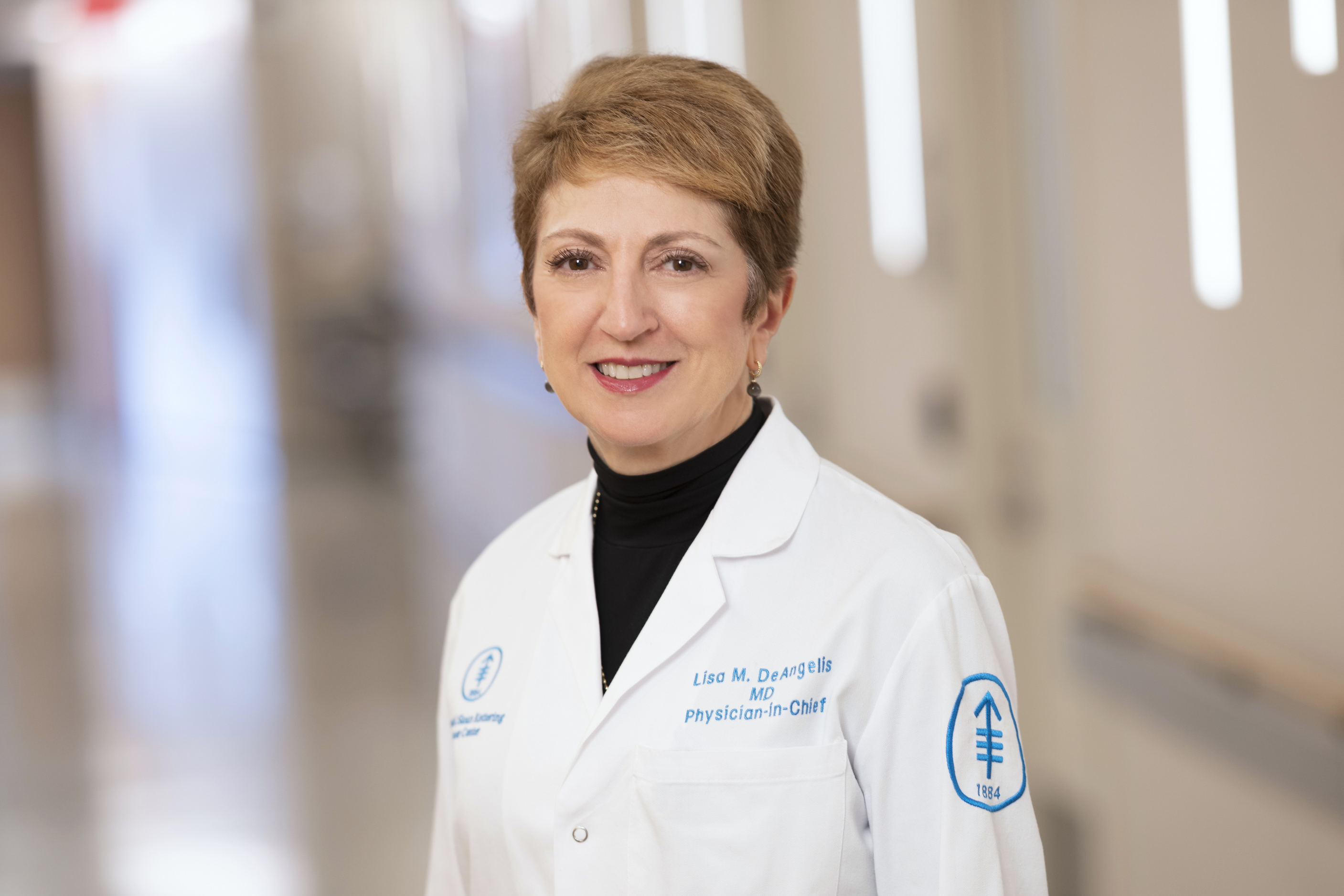
- Born: New Haven, Connecticut, US
- Spouse: Peter Okin (m. 1977)

Academic background
- Education: BSc, Wellesley College; MD, 1980, Columbia University Vagelos College of Physicians and Surgeons

Academic work
- Institutions: Memorial Sloan Kettering Cancer Center

Lisa Marie DeAngelis is an American neuro-oncologist and Physician-in-Chief and Chief Medical Officer at Memorial Sloan Kettering Cancer Center.

== Early life and education ==
DeAngelis was born and raised in New Haven, Connecticut, to father Daniel DeAngelis. She graduated from Hopkins School and Wellesley College. Following this, she earned her medical degree at the Columbia University Vagelos College of Physicians and Surgeons in 1980 and completed her fellowship in internal medicine at the NewYork-Presbyterian Hospital.

== Career ==
Following her fellowship at the hospital, DeAngelis joined Memorial Sloan Kettering Cancer Center (MSKCC) to complete her second fellowship under the guidance of Jerome Posner. Upon completing her fellowship, she joined the faculty at MSKCC and was appointed Chair of the Department of Neurology in 1997. In this role, she focused her research on the neurologic complications of cancer and led national trials of investigational drugs for primary central nervous system lymphomas.

By 2012, DeAngelis was serving as Chair of the Department of Neurology and Co-Executive Director of the Brain Tumor Center. She also held the Lillian Rojtman Berkman Chair in honor of her mentor, Jerome B. Posner, and served as Vice President of the American Academy of Neurology. As a result of her accomplishments, DeAngelis was elected a Member of the National Academy of Medicine. A few years later, in 2019, she was appointed the Physician-in-Chief and Chief Medical Officer of MSKCC. In this role, she was expected to oversee all clinical services, research, medical education, multi-center collaborations, and seven regional care sites across New York and New Jersey.

During the COVID-19 pandemic, DeAngelis was recognized in Crain’s New York Business' 2020 Notable in Healthcare List for being "a visionary leader for the MSK community," and on Avenue Magazine’s The Power List 2020. In November, DeAngelis was awarded the Oligo Nation’s Lifetime Achievement Award for her leadership in the field of neuro-oncology. The following year, she began her tenure (2021 to 2025) on the Board of Directors of Break Through Cancer, a foundation aimed at accelerating collaborative research, clinical trials, and cures for the deadliest cancers.

== Personal life ==
DeAngelis is married to Peter Okin, a cardiology specialist. They have two sons together, Daniel and Stephen.
