= Marrion Wilcox =

American novelist

Marrion Wilcox (April 3, 1858, in Augusta, Georgia – December 26, 1926, in New York City) was a United States author and editor. He took a special interest in Latin America.

== Biography ==
He was the son of Daniel Hand Wilcox, a merchant, and Francis Louisa (Ansley) Wilcox. He attended the Hopkins Grammar School. He graduated from Yale in 1878 (B.A.), where he won the Yale Literary Magazine prize medal in 1876 and did graduate studies in history and Anglo-Saxon in 1878. He then studied law with Box & Norton in Buffalo, New York, and at Hamilton College, where he graduated with an LL.B. in 1880. After further graduate studies at Yale (1880 and 1881), he traveled abroad and made special studies in history and philology at the universities of Oxford, Heidelberg, Jena and Berlin.

He was admitted to the New York bar, and practiced in Buffalo. From 1883 to 1884, he taught at Williston Academy. He was an instructor of German at Yale from 1884 to 1886. He was associate editor of the New Englander and the Yale Review. In 1888, he took two years to travel abroad. Beginning in 1893, he moved his residence to New York City, and was engaged in editorial and other literary work there. In 1902 he became noted as an advocate of fair play to Cuba, defending the principle of reciprocity in the United States and urging concessions from the political leaders and economic associations of Cuba. His principles were approximately those embodied in the treaty submitted to Congress and accepted in 1903.

From 1906 to 1907, he visited South America and Mexico. In 1907 and especially in Mexico, Brazil and Argentina, Wilcox suggested the interchange of professors between the United States and Latin American countries.

== Works ==
- Real People (1886)
- Senora Villena and Gray (1888)
- A Short History of the War with Spain (1898)
- Sketches in Spain, England and Italy (1899)
- Harper's History of the War in the Philippines (1900)
- Completed for Labour, a novel (1923)

Wilcox contributed many articles on Central and South American topics to the Encyclopedia Americana and edited, in collaboration with George E. Rines, The Encyclopedia of Latin-America (1917). He also contributed articles to the North American Review, the Churchman, Atlantic Monthly, the Scientific American, the Architectural Record, and other periodicals.

== Family ==
In 1885, he married Eleanor Patricia, daughter of Louis Buenaventuro and Eleanor Sanchez of Puerto Rico. They had two children: Inez Coralie (who became a noted writer), and Elinor Hand. Eleanor Patricia Wilcox died in 1918. Marrion Wilcox had three sisters and four brothers.
