= Themo H. Peel =

American author and illustrator

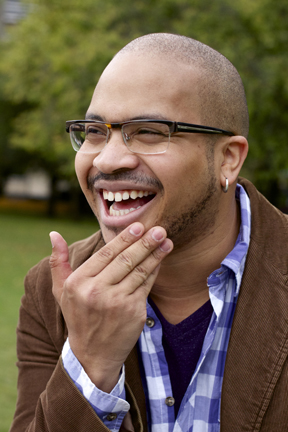
- Born: Harold Dozier; August 1982 (age 43–44); New Haven, Connecticut, U.S.
- Education: Yale University; University of Edinburgh (MA)
- Occupations: Author, illustrator, poet
- Writing career
- Pen name: Themo H. Peel
- Genres: Fantasy, high fantasy, Poetry
- Notable works: Black Star; Spirit Shear
- Website: themohpeel.blogspot.com

Harold Dozier (born 1982), known by his pen name of Themo H. Peel, is an American writer, poet, and graphic designer best known as the author and illustrator of the fantasy novel "Black Star", part of the children's book series Emersus Project. Themo has authored and illustrated a number of children's fantasy stories and poetry anthologies. He attended Yale University studying fine arts (graphic design) before completing an MA in meriting (poetry) at the University of Edinburgh. He currently lives and writes in Edinburgh, Scotland.

== Career ==
Themo's first experience with writing children's literature was with the book Jack and Alice, which was written for friends to celebrate the birth of their children. He subsequently wrote and illustrated a sequel: Jack and Alice: Where Are The Cats?

As part of Themo's academic development, he wrote and illustrated his first children's book, Unexplained Phenomena (and Various Excuses Why) containing a variety of children's poems. The theme of his first anthology dealt with explanations for the bizarre occurrences in childhood. Shortly following this he illustrated a book, Kroll and Peel’s Illustrated Guide to Infectious Diseases for Young People who are Especially Curious. This was completed in partnership with David Kroll, MD; it was tongue-in-cheek guide for children about the world of diseases with illustrations of the various bacteria, viruses and parasites.

His first young-adult novel, Black Star, was published in October 2013 and featured his own illustrations and designs. A percentage of the sales of the book were donated to Book Aid International, a charity that increases access to books and supports literacy, education and development in Sub-Saharan Africa. Themo's second novel, and second book in the Emersus Project series, Spirit Shear was published in March 2016.

He has had writing published in Arlington Literary Journal, Dillydoun Review, and Beyond Queer Words. He performs regularly at spoken word events in Edinburgh and has been a featured poet with I Am Loud Productions performing at the Scottish Storytelling Centre.
