= Peter Anton =

American artist and sculptor

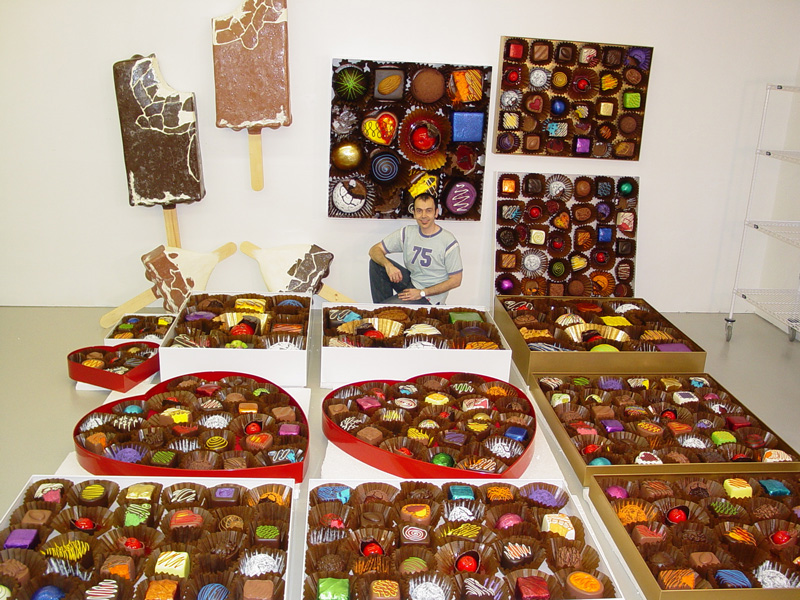
- Peter Anton in his studio with completed sculptures
- Born: 1963 (age 62–63); New Haven, Connecticut
- Known for: Sculpture

Peter Anton (born 1963 in New Haven, Connecticut) is an American artist and sculptor. Anton,"the world's sweetest sculptor," is known for his candy-themed sculptures and exhibitions.

== Exhibitions ==
Peter Anton's sculptures have been featured in solo exhibitions in Europe, the United States, and in Asia, including the Fairfield University Art Museum in Fairfield, Connecticut; the Museum Jan in Amstelveen, the Netherlands; and Lyman Allyn Art Museum in New London, Connecticut; the Allan Stone Gallery, Hammer Galleries, and the Bruce R. Lewin Gallery, in New York City; Scott Richards Contemporary Art in San Francisco; Gallery Valentine in East Hampton, New York; Bonner David Galleries in Scottsdale; Urban Art in Seoul, South Korea; Guy Pieters Gallery in Knokke-Heist, Belgium; Gallery Delaive in Amsterdam; Galerie von Braunbehrens in Stuttgart, Germany; Davis Klemm Gallery in Wiesbaden, Germany; and Rarity Gallery in Mykonos, Greece.

Peter Anton's solo exhibition titled "Sweet Dreams" opened at the Lyman Allyn Art Museum on July 18, 2020, and ran through October 18th, 2020. The exhibition included some of Anton's signature sculptures including large boxed chocolates, donuts, ice cream cones and sundaes, and giant cakes on pedestals. The museum broke their own in-person attendance records with this exhibition.

== Special project ==
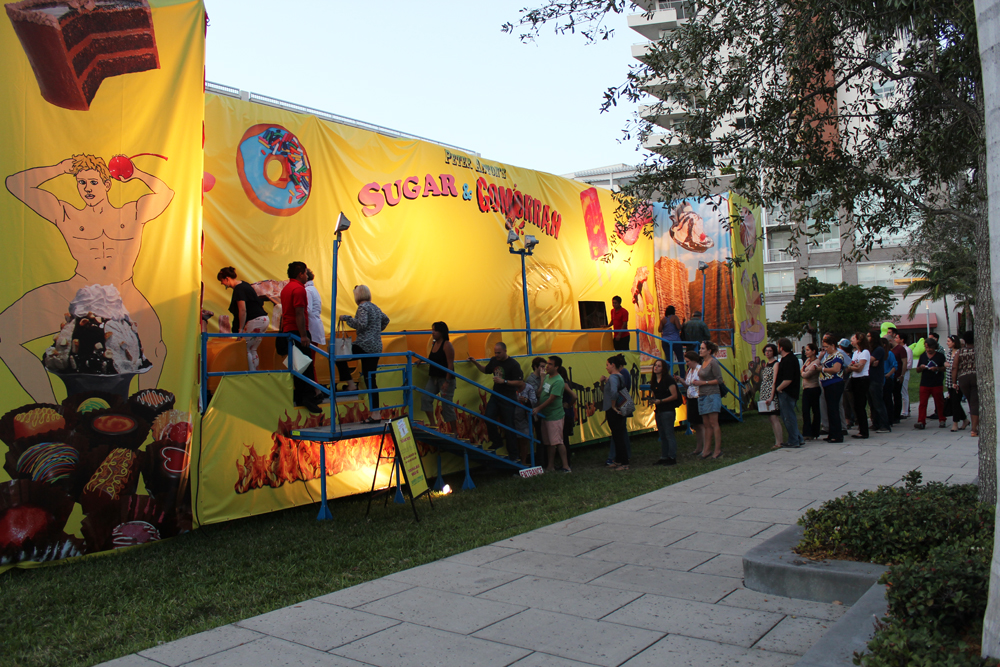
Peter Anton's Sugar & Gomorrah ride-installation during Art Basel Miami in December 2012

On exhibit during Art Basel Miami in December 2012, Peter Anton's Sugar & Gomorrah was the world's first art installation where the viewer rode through an exhibition aboard an amusement ride. Sugar & Gomorrah was an actual roller coaster reworked into an art experience showcasing the juxtaposition between a sense of doom and the magical world of giant sweets. The attendees darted through a snaking tunnel up and down hills rapidly twisting and turning all while viewing a modern interpretation of the destruction of a Sodom and Gomorrah-like world.

== Collections ==
His work is in the permanent collection of museums including the Kemper Museum of Contemporary Art in Kansas City, Missouri; the Copelouzos Art Museum in Athens, Greece; the Lisser Art Museum in Lisse, the Netherlands; the Arkansas Arts Center in Little Rock; the Tennessee State Museum in Nashville and the Aldrich Contemporary Art Museum in Ridgefield, Connecticut.

== Notes ==
1. Dr. Berthold Naumann. "Peter Anton Danger and Delight". Stuttgart, Germany: Galerie von Braunbehrens, 2023. ISBN 978-3-948161-20-0.
2. Linda Traut. "Peter Anton Skulptur". Wiesbaden, Germany: DavisKlemmGallery GmbH & Co. KG, 2021. ISBN 978-3-9822916-0-4.
3. Yann Walcker. "Abc d'art". Toulouse, France: Éditions Milan, 2018. ISBN 978-2745996114.
4. Herwig Guratzsch. "Lieblingsbilder aus der Sammlung Grosshaus". Cologne, Germany: Walther Konig, 2013. ISBN 978-3-86335-345-2.
5. Walther Konig. "Luscious Assortment: Kostliche Mischung aus der Sammlung Grosshaus". Schleswig, Germany: Schloss Gottorf, 2013. ISBN 3863352718, ISBN 978-3863352714.
6. Dr. Barbara Willert. "Kunst mit Schokolade/Art with Chocolate". Heidelberg, Germany: Verlag Das Wunderhorn, 2012. ISBN 978-3-88423-408-2.
7. Bartholomew F. Bland. I Want Candy: The Sweet Stuff in American Art. New York: Hudson River Museum, 2007. ISBN 978-0-943651-34-7.
8. Sarah Tanguy. Sweet Tooth. New York: Distributed Art Publishers, 2002. ISBN 0-9712643-1-7.
9. Dr. Stefanie Dathe. In Aller Munde. Burgrieden, Germany: Museum Villa Rot, 2010. ISBN 978-3-933614-58-2.
10. Reinhard Spieler. "I Love Aldi". Ludwigshafen, Germany: Wilhelm Hack Museum, 2011. ISBN 978-3-86335-095-6.
11. Caroll Michels. "How to Survive and Prosper as an Artist: Selling Yourself without Selling Your Soul". New York: Allworth Press, 2018. ISBN 978-1621536130.
