= A Game Chicken =

1922 film by Chester M. Franklin

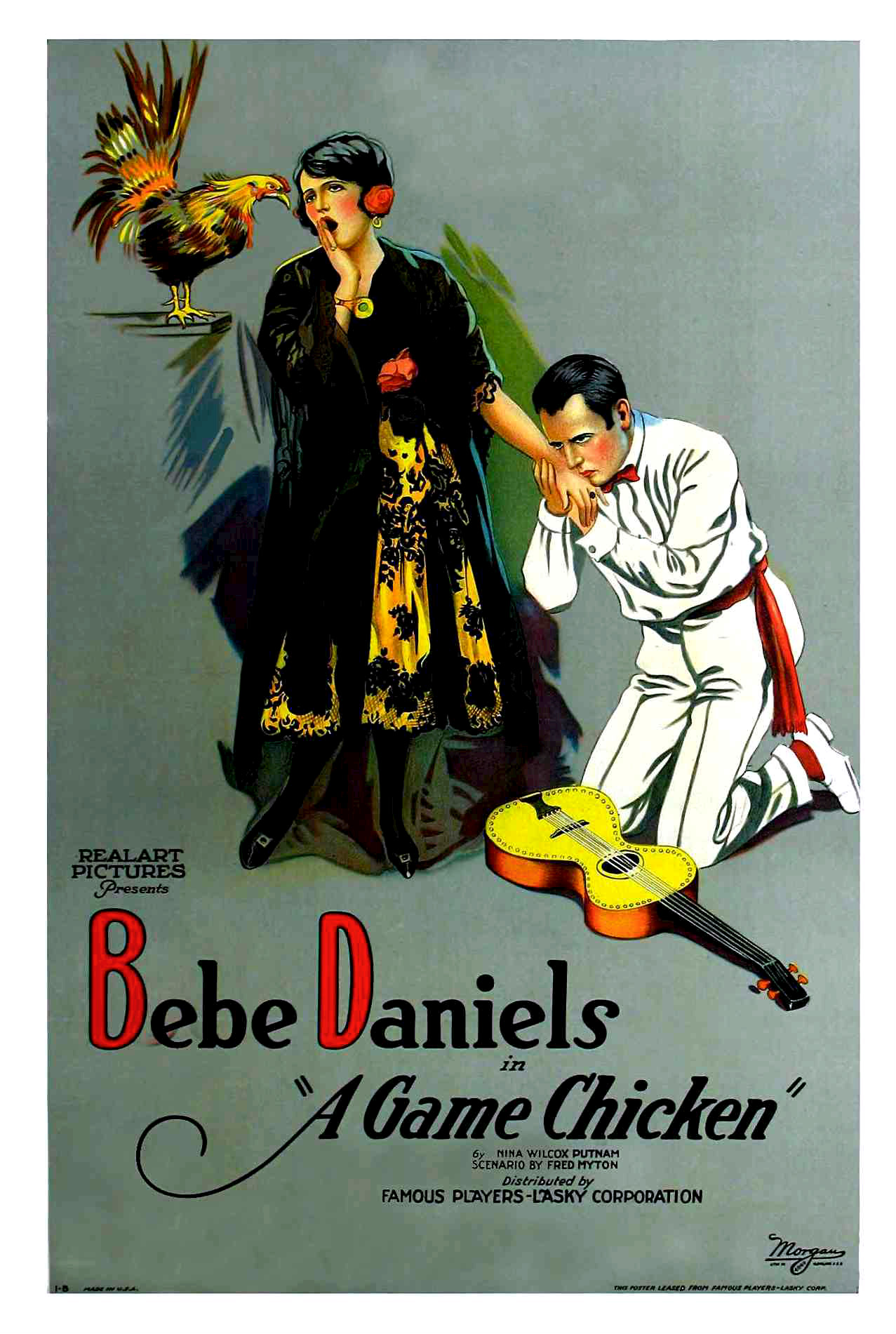
- Theatrical release poster
- Directed by: Chester Franklin
- Written by: Fred Myton
- Story by: Nina Wilcox Putnam
- Starring: Bebe Daniels
- Cinematography: George J. Folsey
- Production company: Realart Pictures Corporation
- Distributed by: Famous Players–Lasky
- Release date: February 26, 1922
- Running time: 50 minutes; 5 reels
- Country: United States
- Language: Silent

A Game Chicken is a lost 1922 American silent romantic comedy film produced by Realart Pictures and distributed by Famous Players–Lasky. This film starred Bebe Daniels and was directed by Chester Franklin.

== Cast ==
- Bebe Daniels as Inez Hastings
- Pat O'Malley as Rush Thompson
- James Gordon as Joshua Hastings
- Martha Mattox as Camilla Hastings
- Gertrude Norman as Senora Juanita Martinez
- Hugh Thompson as Jose Maria Lavendera
- Max Weatherwax as Jo-Jo
- Mattie Peters as Marietta
- Charles Force as Captain Snodgrass
- Edwin Stevens as Hiram Proudfoot
