= Isaqueena =

Historic house in South Carolina, United States

- Isaqueena (Gassaway Mansion)
- U.S. National Register of Historic Places
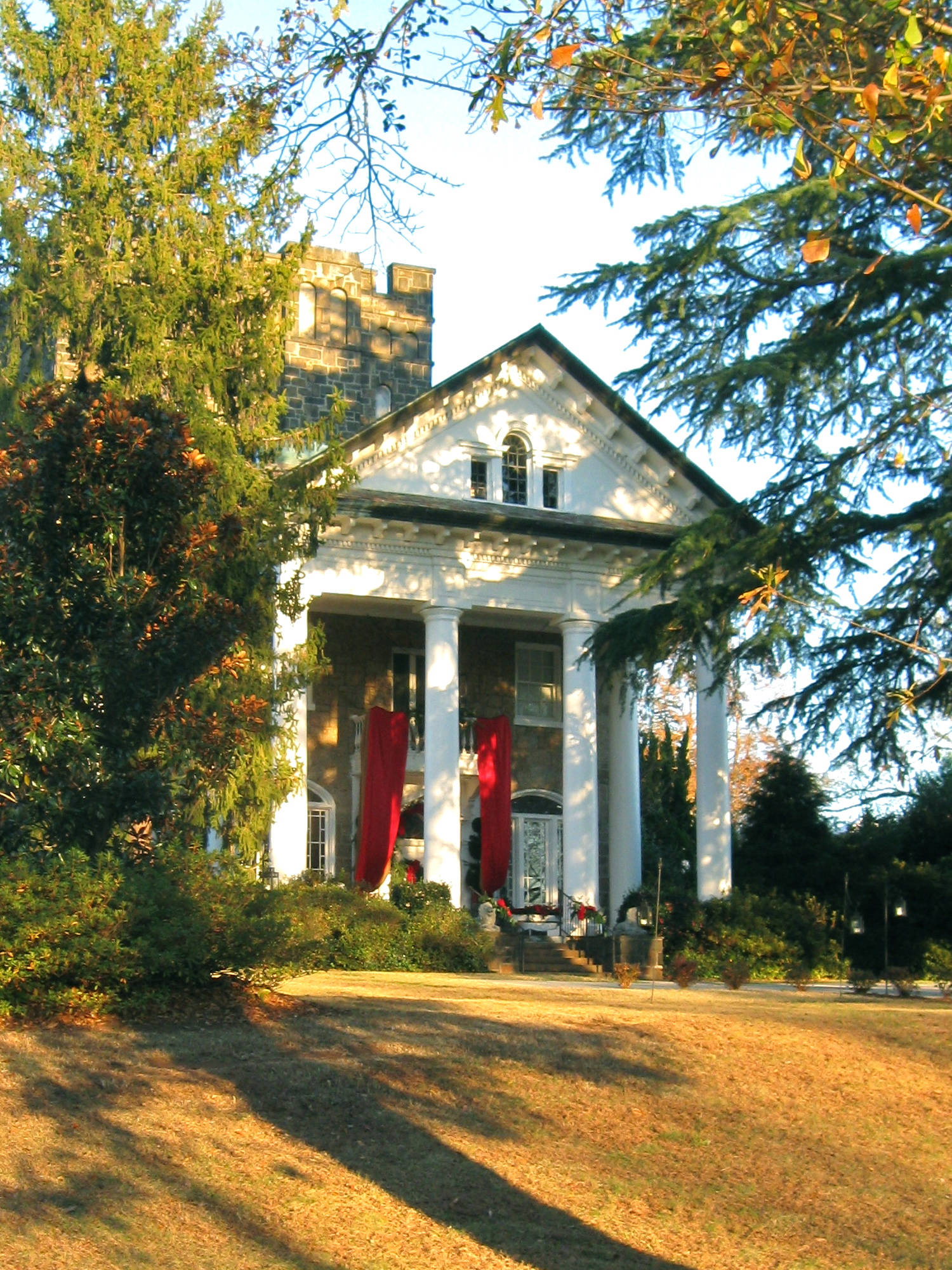
- Isaqueena (Gassaway Mansion), 2013

- Location within South Carolina Location within the United States
- Location: 106 Dupont Drive, Greenville, South Carolina
- Coordinates: 34°51′44″N 82°22′24″W
- Area: 2 acres (0.81 ha)
- Built: 1919-24
- Architect: Minnie Quinn Gassaway
- Architectural style: Neo-Gothic and neoclassical
- NRHP reference No.: 82003859
- Added to NRHP: July 1, 1982

Isaqueena, also known as the Gassaway Mansion, is a historic house in Greenville, South Carolina, and the largest private residence in the Upstate. In 1982 it was listed in the National Register of Historic Places.

The 40-room house was built between 1919 and 1924 by Walter L. Gassaway, a banker and textile mill owner; his wife, Minnie Quinn Gassaway, designed the structure after taking a correspondence course in architecture. Mrs. Gassaway used the mansion itself for entertaining, including card parties and "entertainments in the music room and ballroom", but she also supervised the 110-acre estate that included a working farm and dairy.

As the National Register nomination notes, the three-story house is "an unusual example of eclecticism", blending neo-Gothic and neoclassical elements that include six Doric columns, a Palladian window, a castellated tower, two rooftop patios, and a massive porte-cochère. Stone for the random bond masonry was in part taken from a mid-nineteenth-century grist mill on the Reedy River owned by Greenville founder Vardry McBee.

Walter Gassaway died of a heart attack on June 4, 1930. The following year his widow abandoned Isaqueena for a smaller home (which she also designed) closer to downtown Greenville. Most of the estate was sold for house lots, and the mansion was converted into rental apartments. In 1959, the building was purchased by the fledgling Greenville Art Museum, which occupied it and built an art school building on the property. After the art museum moved to a purpose-built gallery on Greenville's Heritage Green in 1974, the mansion sat vacant until purchased in 1977 for use as a church and school. The building once again became a private residence in the 1990s, and it has since been maintained through rentals as a wedding venue.
