= John Putnam (comics) =

American comics writer (1917–1980)

Putnam in 1963

John Francis Putnam (June 21, 1917 – November 29, 1980) was the art director and designer of Mad from 1954 to 1980. "Until John came to us, Mad was just a comic book," said publisher Bill Gaines following Putnam's death. "He joined Mad as a $75 a week temporary employee, and was [in 1980] the oldest member of the staff both in terms of age and time with the magazine."

Putnam, the son of the novelist-playwright Nina Wilcox Putnam, also drew occasional cartoons for Mad. He was the co-creator of the "Mad Zeppelin," and the originator of the magazine's "Arthur the potted plant." The latter sight gag had its origins in a pot of homegrown marijuana Putnam had been quietly growing in the Mad art department until it was recognized by an editor who told him to get rid of it. In Frank Jacobs' book "The MAD World of William M. Gaines," Jacobs reported that Putnam "saw that it was disposed of in a nonwasteful manner."

Putnam also created the "mascot" and logo for Paul Krassner's The Realist, where he was a longtime contributor. Prior to joining Mad, he had run his own freelance art studio. Putnam stored Mad artwork in drawers with labels like "Pornography" and "Transvestia."

In 1954, he scripted the story "Dien Bien Phu!" for EC Comics' Two-Fisted Tales No. 40 (December 1954 – January 1955).

Putnam, a photographer, military history expert, miniature model enthusiast, and a collector of sea shells and classical French literature, lived in the West Village, where he had a number of gallery shows of his wood sculptures and painted paper constructions. He was friends with Diane Arbus, and they sometimes took photographs together at the Hudson River docks. He recalled, "Diane and I often talked about France. She couldn't get over the fact that I stlll spoke French like a native. Sometimes I'd translate Proust for her, or Charles Trenet lyrics. She told me she'd had a French nanny as a kid and had once believed she spoke French fluently, but no longer could remember a word of it." Putnam also served as translator when Cuban cartoonist Antonio Prohias first arrived at the Mad offices, unable to speak a word of English.

John Putnam lived on Occident Avenue on Staten Island in the 60s with his wife and two sons.

During one of the annual Mad staff trips, Putnam died of pneumonia in Munich, Germany. The magazine's staff had been forced to return to New York while Putnam was still lingering in the hospital, but his longtime friend, Mad artist George Woodbridge remained behind to stay with Putnam, and ultimately to accompany his body back to the United States.
