= Minna Weiss Zellner =

American artist

- Born: 1889; New Haven, CT
- Died: December 17, 1982 (aged 92–93); New Haven, CT
- Education: Pratt Institute
- Known for: printmaking, etching

Minna Weiss Zellner (17 December 1889 – 7 March 1982) was an American artist who primarily worked in printmaking. She primarily lived in Philadelphia, and was most active as an artist in the 1930s.

She married Carl Sina Zellner in 1918.

She had an identical twin sister, Ray Weiss, who was also an artist. They were known as the Weiss sisters. They both attended Pratt Institute in Brooklyn, New York, and graduated in 1911. They went on to study with Edouard Leon in Paris during the 1920s and 30s. The two sisters traveled around Europe where they made sketches that were then fully realized as prints. The sisters participated in many exhibitions in Paris and the U.S. and are known for their etchings.

In 1923, she and her sister opened Camp Lacota for boys in Rangeley, Maine.

== Collections ==
Zellner's work is included in the collections of the Smithsonian American Art Museum and the Metropolitan Museum of Art. Seven of her prints are held in the permanent collection of the British Museum.
