= Alfred Eaton Ives =

American minister and politician

Alfred Eaton Ives (December 12, 1809 – August 2, 1892) was an American minister and politician.

Ives, second son of Enoch and Sarah (Gorham) Ives, of New Haven, Connecticut, was born there on December 12, 1809. He enrolled at Yale College in the class of 1837. At the close of the Sophomore year he left his class and began the study of theology in the Yale Divinity School, where he remained for three years. In 1847 he was given an honorary degree by the College, and his name was enrolled with his class. On September 25, 1838, he was ordained as pastor of the Congregational Church in Colebrook, Conn., where he remained until May 2, 1848. On September 5, 1849, he was installed over the Congregational Church in Deerfield, Mass., and there continued until April 11, 1855, when he went to Castine, Maine, where he was installed pastor of the Congregational Church on June 20. He was dismissed from this pastorate of twenty-three years on June 18, 1878, but retained his residence among an attached people. In 1879 and 1883-84 he was a member of the Maine House of Representatives. He died in Castine, from an attack of influenza, on August 2, 1892, in his 83rd year.

He married, on November 6, 1838, Harriet P., daughter of Richard Stone, of New Haven, who died on January 26, 1889. Their children were three daughters, who died in early childhood, and two sons who survived him, both graduates of Amherst College, the younger being also a graduate of the Yale Divinity School.
