= List of Elizabethan Club members =

Members of Yale University social group

The Elizabethan Club is a social club that was founded in 1911 at Yale University. Following are some of the notable members of the Elizabethan Club.

== Academia ==
- Wilbur Cortez Abbott, historian and professor at Yale University
- George Burton Adams, medievalist historian who taught at Yale University
- George Pierce Baker (honorary), professor of English at Harvard University and Yale University
- Alfred Bellinger, archaeologist and numismatist who taught at Yale University
- Richard H. Brodhead, president of Duke University and dean of Yale College
- Clive Day, professor of economic history at Yale University
- Henry Walcott Farnam, professor of political economy at Yale University
- Richard Foster Flint, professor of geology at Yale University
- Charles Mills Gayley (honorary), professor of English, the classics, and academic dean of the University of California, Berkeley
- A. Bartlett Giamatti, president of Yale University, commissioner of Major League Baseball, and President of th
- e National League
- Alfred Whitney Griswold, president of Yale University
- Ashbel Green Gulliver, dean of Yale Law School
- Francis Barton Gummere (honorary), English professor at Haverford College; folklore and ancient languages scholar
- Arthur Twining Hadley (honorary), president of Yale University
- Cyrus Hamlin, English and literature professor at Yale University and the University of Toronto
- Ray Heffner, president of Brown University
- William Ernest Hocking, philosophy professor at Harvard University
- G. Evelyn Hutchinson, Sterling Professor of Zoology at Yale University
- A. V. Williams Jackson (honorary), professor of Indo-Iranian languages at Columbia University
- Albert Galloway Keller, sociologist and professor at Yale University
- Joseph Koerner, art historian and professor at Harvard University
- George Kubler, art historian
- Charlton Miner Lewis, chair of the English Department at Yale University
- Wilmarth Sheldon Lewis, scholar and founder of the Lewis Walpole Library at Yale University
- Thomas Lounsbury (honorary), professor of English language and literature at Yale University
- Henry Noble MacCracken, president of Vassar College
- John Matthews Manly (honorary), professor of English literature and philology at the University of Chicago
- Edward Parmelee Morris, classist and professor at Yale University
- Wallace Notestein, Sterling Professor of English History at Yale University
- Bernadotte Perrin, Lampson Professor of Greek literature and history at Yale University
- Henri Peyre, linguist, literary scholar and Sterling Professor of French emeritus at Yale University
- William Lyon Phelps, Lampson Professor of English Literature at Yale University
- Eugene V. Rostow, dealn of Yale Law School
- Felix Emanuel Schelling (honorary), professor of English literature at the University of Pennsylvania
- Vincent Scully, art historian and professor at Yale University
- Charles Seymour, president of Yale University
- Ted Sizer, founder and president of the Essential Schools Movement
- Chauncey Brewster Tinker, scholar of English Literature and Sterling Professor at Yale University
- Charles Cutler Torrey, taught Semitic languages at Andover Theological Seminary and Yale University
- Williston Walker, church historian with Yale University
- John Ferguson Weir, painter, sculptor, first director and dean of the School of Fine Arts at Yale University

== Art and architecture ==
- Grosvenor Atterbury, architect, urban planner and writer
- Carroll Carstairs, art dealer
- George S. Chappell, architect
- William Henry Goodyear, architectural historian, art historian, and curator of the Metropolitan Museum of Art and the Brooklyn Institute of Arts and Sciences, now the Brooklyn Museum
- Huc-Mazelet Luquiens, printmaker and painter
- Robert Osborn, satiric cartoonist and illustrator

== Business ==
- John Crosby Brown, senior partner in the investment bank Brown Bros. & Co.
- Alexander Smith Cochran, manufacturer, sportsman, and philanthropist
- Gifford A. Cochran, owner of Thoroughbred racehorses and winner Kentucky Derby and the Preakness Stakes
- Theodore Low De Vinne (honorary), printer and scholarly author on typography
- Henry Clay Folger (honorary), chairman of Standard Oil of New York and co-founder of the Folger Shakespeare Library
- Edward Harkness, director of the Southern Pacific Railroad and philanthropist
- Henry E. Huntington (honorary) creator of the Central Pacific Railroad and collector of art and rare books
- Carl Pforzheimer (honorary), a founder of the American Stock Exchange
- David F. Swensen, investor, endowment fund manager, and philanthropist

== Entertainment ==
- T. Lawrason Riggs, lyricist who worked with Cole Porter and Catholic priest
- David Stanley Smith, classical composer
- Jeremy Strong, actor

== Law ==
- Edward Jordan Dimock, senior judge of the United States District Court for the Southern District of New York
- Theodore Salisbury Woolsey, legal scholar and professor of international law at Yale Law School

== Librarianship ==
- William Loring Andrews (honorary), first librarian of New York's Metropolitan Museum of Art
- Ridgely Hunt, librarian of the Yale University Library
- Andrew Keogh (honorary), head librarian of Yale University Library
- Archibald MacLeish, Librarian of Congress, poet, and Assistant Secretary of State for Public and Cultural Relations
- John Christopher Schwab (honorary), librarian of the Yale University Library
- Addison Van Name, University Librarian of Yale University
- Thomas James Wise (honorary), bibliophile who collected the Ashley Library, now housed by the British Library

== Literature and journalism ==
- Thomas Beer, biographer, novelist, essayist, satirist, and author of short fiction
- Henry Augustin Beers, poet, author, literary historian, and professor at Yale University
- Stephen Vincent Benét, poet, short story writer, and novelist
- Harold Bloom, literary critic, scholar, and writer
- C. D. B. Bryan, author and journalist
- William F. Buckley Jr., novelist, conservative author and commentator
- Henry Seidel Canby, literary critic, editor, and Yale University professor
- Jack Randall Crawford, novelist, playwright, and literary critic
- Clarence Day, author best known for Life with Father
- Lee Wilson Dodd, playwright, poet, novelist, and short story writer
- Rufus King, author of detective stories
- Stoddard King, author and songwriter
- Brian Hooker, poet and author
- Kenneth Rand, poet
- George Selden, novelist
- Anson Phelps Stokes Jr. (honorary), biographer and Epsicopal minister
- Robert Penn Warren, poet, novelist, and literary critic
- Barrett Wendell (honorary), author of a series of textbooks including English Composition, studies of Cotton Mather and William Shakespeare
- Thorton Wilder, playwright and novelist
- Peter M. Wolf, author and land planning and urban policy authority
- George Edward Woodberry (honorary), literary critic and poet
- Daniel Yergin, Pulitzer Prize–winning author and vice chairman of S&P Global

== Politics ==
- Charles Montague Bakewell, United States House of Representatives
- Jonathan B. Bingham, U.S. House of Representatives and US delegate to the United Nations General Assembly
- William L. Borden, executive director of the United States Congress Joint Committee on Atomic Energy
- William Christian Bullitt Jr., U.S. Ambassidor to France and U.S. Ambassidor to the Soviet Union
- Edwin Corning, Lieutenant Governor of New York
- Wilbur Lucius Cross, Governor of Connecticut
- Simeon E. Baldwin (honorary), Governor of Connecticut and chief justice of the Connecticut Supreme Court of Errors
- Aaron Vanderpoel, U.S. House of Representatives
