= Charlton Miner Lewis =

American academic (1866–1923)

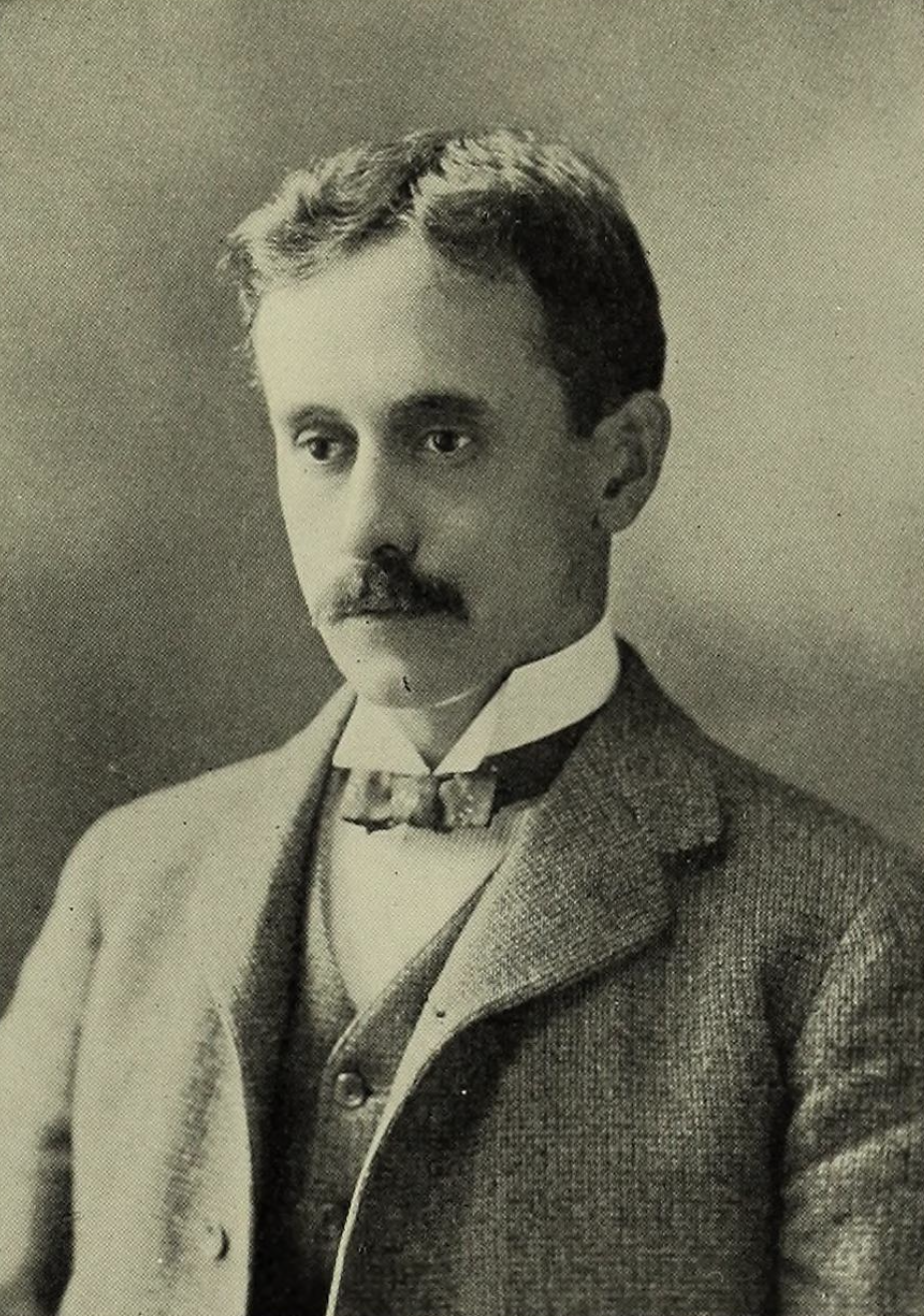
- Born: March 4, 1866; Brooklyn, New York
- Died: March 12, 1923 (aged 57); New Haven, Connecticut
- Burial place: Grove Street Cemetery
- Education: Yale College, B.A. (1886); Columbia University, LL.B. (1889); Yale University, Ph.D. (1898)

Charlton Miner Lewis (March 4, 1866 – March 12, 1923) was an American scholar of English literature. Having attended Yale University and studied law, he worked as a lawyer for a few years before returning to Yale as a teacher, getting his Ph.D., and publishing a number of books on English versification and literature.

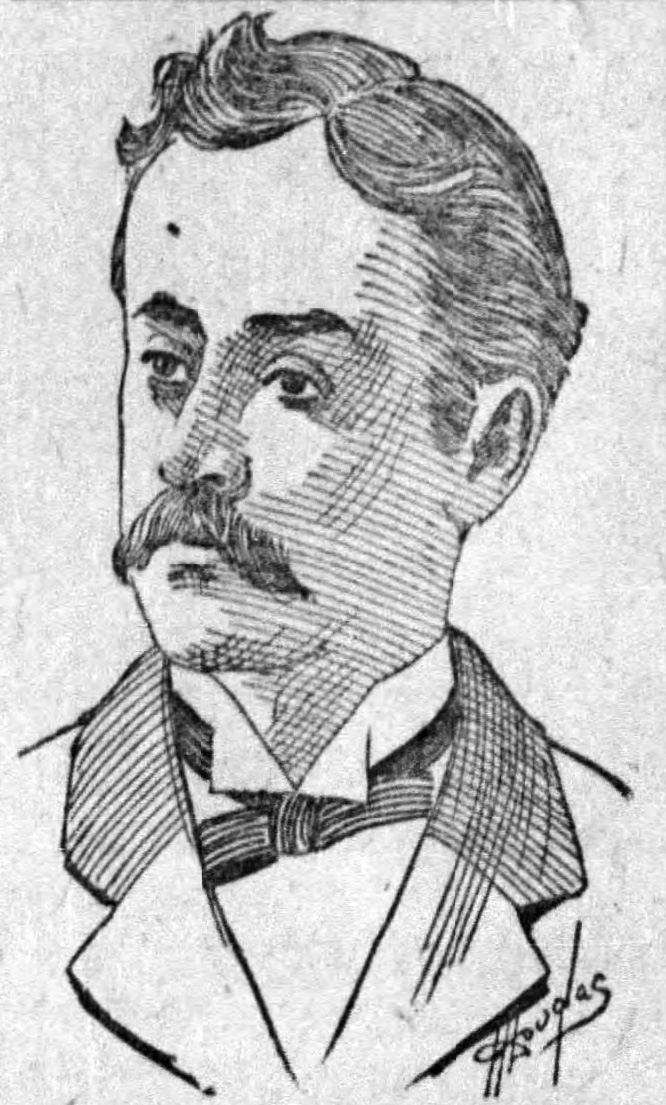
Portrait of Lewis in Hartford Courant, 1899

== Biography ==
Lewis, born on March 4, 1866, in Brooklyn, New York, was the younger of two sons of Charlton Thomas Lewis and his first wife, Nancy Dunlap McKeen Lewis. His father was a professor of mathematics and Greek at Troy University and later practiced law. Lewis attended Yale University and graduated with a B.A. in 1886. He attended graduate school at Yale for a year as a Clark Scholar. He studied law at Columbia University and received his LL.B. in 1889. He passed the bar and worked as a lawyer until 1894.

In 1894 he was hired by Yale as an English instructor and spent a year in New York City, preparing for his appointment, which he took up in 1895. He was simultaneously enrolled in the Ph.D. program, and earned that degree in 1898; in that same year he was appointed as assistant professor. From 1899 until his death he occupied the Emily Sanford Professorship of English Literature. During that period he also served as chair of the English Department and as chair of the English faculty in Yale's graduate school.

Lewis specialized in versification and meter, and wrote his Ph.D. dissertation, published in 1898, on the subject of the influence of French and Latin verse on the English iambic line; in The foreign sources of modern English versification he attempted to explain the metrical origins and qualities of English verse and argued that the influence of French in the Middle English period was formative in the development of English verse. One of his roles was to serve as the first judge for the Yale Series of Younger Poets; he also edited the commemorative volume for Yale's bicentennial celebration, and Macbeth for the Yale Shakespeare. In 1904 he published a "retelling" of the Middle English Sir Gawain and the Green Knight, as Gawayne and the Green Knight, and in 1916 he published three poems on Sir Gawain. His 1907 publication The Genesis of Hamlet, according to one reviewer, "helps us to understand the famous mystery of the melancholy Prince of Denmark".

In 1917 he wrote the foreword for A Book of Verse of the Great War, edited by William Reginald Wheeler; in it he praised Edith M. Thomas's "A Woman's Cry", though lumping her with the pacifists of whom he said that "happily [they] are a minority sect"; Ridgely Torrence and Edith Thomas were singled out from other pacifists because "in pacifists of this type there is nothing contemptible except their logic".

He died of complications from influenza on March 12, 1923, at his home in New Haven, Connecticut and was buried at Grove Street Cemetery. Some of his poems, which had been published in Harper's Magazine, The Yale Review, and other outlets, were gathered with his Gawayne and the Green Knight in a volume, Poems, edited by Henry Augustin Beers and published by Yale University Press the year after his death.

== Books ==
- The Foreign Sources of Modern English Versification (New York, H. Holt, 1898)
- The Beginnings of English Literature (Boston, Ginn, 1900, repr. 1901)
- Gawayne and the Green Knight: A Fairy Tale (a retelling of Sir Gawain and the Green Knight; Boston and New York, Houghton, Mifflin and company, 1903, 1904; Yale UP, 1916)
- The Genesis of Hamlet (New York, H. Holt, 1907)
- The Principles of English Verse (New York, H. Holt, 1906)
- The Record of the Celebration of the Two Hundredth Anniversary of the Founding of Yale College, Held at Yale university, in New Haven, Connecticut, October the Twentieth to October the Twenty-third A.D. Nineteen Hundred and One (New Haven, Yale UP, 1902)
- The Tragedy of Macbeth (New Haven: Yale UP, 1918)
- Poems (New Haven, Yale UP, 1924)
