= Alexander Welsh =

American philologist (1933–2018)

Alexander Welsh (April 29, 1933 – April 11, 2018) was an American philologist, the author of books including Freud's Wishful Dream Book (1994).

Born on April 29, 1933, Welsh served in the United States Army. He earned a doctorate from Harvard University, then taught at Yale University between 1960 and 1967. Welsh subsequently joined the University of Pittsburgh faculty and later the University of California Los Angeles, before returning to Yale in 1991, where he was named the Emily Sanford Professor of English. Welsh was awarded a Guggenheim Fellowship in 1969, and served as editor of Nineteenth-Century Literature between 1975 and 1981. He died on April 11, 2018, aged 84, survived by his partner, Ruth Yeazell, who also taught at Yale, and three children.
