= Samuel Peck =

Samuel Peck may refer to:

- Samuel Peck (daguerreotypist) (1813–1879), American photographer, artist, businessperson, photo case manufacturer, and gallery owner.
- Samuel Minturn Peck (1854–1938), American poet
- Samuel Stanley Peck (1829–1901), Ontario lawyer, judge and political figure
