= Connecticut Academy of Arts and Sciences =

American learned society

The Connecticut Academy of Arts and Sciences (CAAS) is a learned society founded in 1799 in New Haven, Connecticut "to cultivate every art and science which may tend to advance the interest and happiness of a free and virtuous people." Its purpose is the dissemination of scholarly information.

The CAAS operates as a 501(c)(3) Public Charity. In 2014, it claimed $40,098 in total revenue, $33,410 in total expenses, and $111,835 in total assets.

In the 2023–2024 academic year, the CAAS had 307 members.

== Publications ==
- Transactions of the Connecticut Academy of Arts and Sciences
- Memoirs of the Connecticut Academy of Arts and Sciences
- A Manual of the Writings in Middle English
- Catalogue of publications

== Notable members ==
- Asger Aaboe, historian and mathematician
- Hezekiah Augur, sculptor and inventor
- Simeon E. Baldwin, jurist, law professor and governor
- Charles Emerson Beecher, paleontologist
- Bertram Boltwood, radiochemist
- Sheila Levrant de Bretteville, graphic designer, artist and educator
- William Henry Brewer, botanist
- George Jarvis Brush, mineralogist and academic administrator
- Henry A. Bumstead, electromagnetist
- Russell Henry Chittenden, biochemist
- Edward Salisbury Dana, mineralogist and physicist
- Arnold Dashefsky, sociologist
- Franklin Bowditch Dexter, librarian and university administrator
- Timothy Dwight, educator and theologian
- Edson Fessenden Gallaudet, aviator
- Josiah Willard Gibbs, physicist, chemist, and mathematician
- Frank Austin Gooch, chemist and engineer
- Henry Solon Graves, forester and educator
- Charles Sheldon Hastings, physicist
- Yandell Henderson, physiologist
- James Mason Hoppin, educator and writer
- George Trumbull Ladd, philosopher, educator, and psychologist
- Joseph LaPalombara, political scientist
- Charles Lemert, sociologist
- Linda Lorimer, university administrator
- Chester Lyman, president
- George Grant MacCurdy, anthropologist
- Ronald Mallett, theoretical physicist
- Lafayette Mendel, nutritionist
- Hubert Anson Newton, astronomer and mathematician
- Alexander Petrunkevitch, arachnologist
- Charles Brinckerhoff Richards, engineer
- William North Rice, geologist, educator, Methodist theologian
- John Rose, organist
- Edward Elbridge Salisbury, Sanskritist
- Benjamin Silliman, chemist and geologist
- H. Catherine W. Skinner, geologist, mineralogist, and the first woman to serve as president of the academy.
- Joseph Siry, architectural historian
- Gaddis Smith, historian
- Percey F. Smith, mathematician
- Jennifer Tucker, historian and biologist
- Addison Van Name, librarian and linguist
- John Monroe Van Vleck, mathematician and astronomer
- Addison Emery Verrill, president
- Noah Webster, lexicographer, author, editor, prolific author
- Eli Whitney, inventor of cotton gin
- William Kurtz Wimsatt Jr., literary theorist and critic

== Sources ==
- Rollin Gustav Osterweis, The Sesquicentennial History of the Connecticut Academy of Arts and Sciences (New Haven, 1949)
- Mary Ellen Ellsworth, A History of the Connecticut Academy of Arts and Sciences 1799-1999 (Transactions, vol. 55) ISBN 9781878500816
