= Henry Coit Kingsley =

American lawyer and railroad executive (1815–1886)

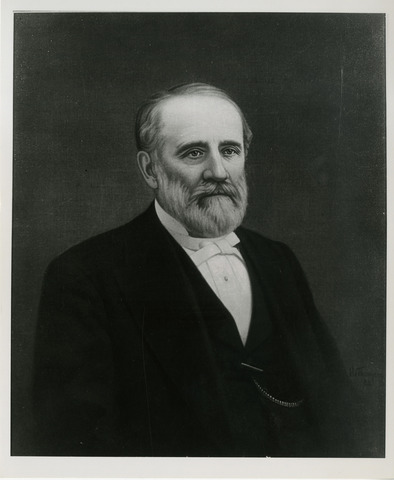
- Portrait of Kingsley by Harry Ives Thompson
- Born: December 11, 1815; New Haven, Connecticut, U.S.
- Died: December 19, 1886 (aged 71); New Haven, Connecticut, U.S.
- Resting place: Grove Street Cemetery
- Education: Yale University
- Occupations: Lawyer; railroad executive
- Spouse: Cornelia H. Day (m. 1841)
- Children: 1
- Father: James Luce Kingsley

Henry Coit Kingsley (December 11, 1815 – December 19, 1886) was an American lawyer who served as director of the Cleveland and Pittsburgh Railroad Company and as treasurer of Yale University.

== Early life ==
Henry Coit Kingsley was born on December 11, 1815, in New Haven, Connecticut, to Lydia (née Coit) and James Luce Kingsley. His father was a professor at Yale University. Kingsley attended Hopkins Grammar School. He graduated from Yale in 1834. Following graduation, he worked a few months as a private tutor. He studied at Yale Law School for two years from 1835 to 1837, except the winter of 1836 to 1837 where he worked in a law office in Columbus, Ohio. He was admitted to the bar in Ohio in December 1837.

== Career ==
In 1837, Kingsley started a law partnership with his brother George T. Kingsley in Cleveland. He continued practicing law and united with it land agencies. In 1852, he left his practice due to ill health and traveled to Europe. Following Europe, he moved back to New Haven. In 1854, he was elected director of the Cleveland and Pittsburgh Railroad Company. The company became insolvent in 1857. From 1857 to 1866, he was principal in charge of the financial affairs of the company.

Kingsley was elected treasurer of Yale in July 1862. He remained in the role until his death.

== Personal life ==
Kingsley married Cornelia H. Day, daughter of John Day, of Cleveland on September 6, 1841. They had a daughter. His wife died in 1843. He married Jane Thomas Handy, daughter of Briggs W. Thomas, of Utica, New York, on August 26, 1846. He was deacon of Center Church in New Haven. He lived on Hillhouse Avenue in New Haven.

On November 19, 1886, while driving his carriage, he was thrown and broke two ribs. He died a couple weeks later on December 19 at his home in New Haven. He was buried in Grove Street Cemetery.
