= George Grant MacCurdy =

American anthropologist (1863–1947)

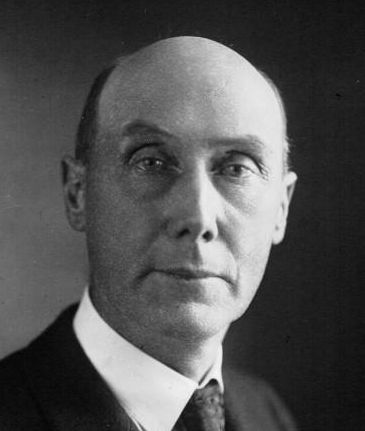
George Grant MacCurdy in 1924

George Grant MacCurdy (April 17, 1863 – November 15, 1947) was an American anthropologist, born at Warrensburg, Mo., where he graduated from the State Normal School in 1887, after which he attended Harvard (AB, 1893; AM, 1894); then studied in Europe at Vienna, Paris (School of Anthropology), and at Berlin (1894–1898; and at Yale (PhD, 1905). He was employed at Yale from 1902 onward as instructor, lecturer, curator of the anthropological collections (1902–1910), and assistant professor of archaeology after 1910. He was a member of the Connecticut Academy of Arts and Sciences and the American Philosophical Society.

== European hypothesis ==
MacCurdy argued for Europe as the origin of the first humans, in his 1924 book Human Origins, he said: “The beginnings of things human, so far as we have been able to discover them, have their fullest exemplification in Europe”. His hypothesis was disproven in the late-mid-20th century, when hundreds of fossils found in East Africa evidenced the region as the cradle of humankind.

== Works ==
He was the author of:

- Obsidian razor of the Aztecs (1900)
- The Eolithic Problem (1905)
- Some Phases of Prehistoric Archœology (1907)
- Recent Discoveries Bearing on the Antiquity of Man in Europe. (1910)
- A Study of Chiriquian Antiquities (1911)
- Review of Mayan Art (1913)
- Human Skulls from Gazelle Peninsula (1914)
- Human Origins (1924)
- The Coming of Man, USA: The University Society, 1935 [1932]
