= Addison Van Name =

American philologist and librarian

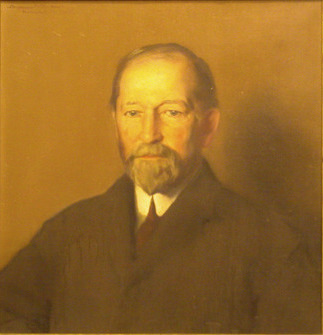
- portrait by William Sergeant Kendall
- Born: November 15, 1835; Chenango
- Died: September 29, 1922 (aged 86)
- Resting place: Grove Street Cemetery
- Occupation: Librarian
- Spouse(s): Julia Van Name
- Children: Ralph Gibbs Van Name, Willard G. Van Name
- Parent(s): Theodosia van Name

Addison Van Name (November 15, 1835 – September 29, 1922) was an American philologist and librarian, serving as University Librarian of Yale University from 1865 to 1904, and was made librarian emeritus in 1905. He himself attended Yale, graduating as valedictorian in 1858. During his forty year tenure as University Librarian, the number of volumes in the Yale Library increased from 44,500 to 475,000. His field of specialty was Orientalia. He taught Hebrew at Yale for four years, and for many years was Librarian of the American Oriental Society.

He was a member of the Acorn Club, to which he was elected in 1901. He was also a member of the Connecticut Academy of Arts and Sciences.

He was married on August 19, 1867 in Berlin to Julia, daughter of Dr. Josiah Willard Gibbs, professor of sacred literature at Yale, and sister of Josiah Willard Gibbs, professor of mathematical physics at Yale. They had three children: Willard Gibbs Van Name, Theodora Van Name, and Ralph Gibbs Van Name.

Van Name, the last of Yale's pre-Civil War scholars, died in New Haven and was buried in Grove Street Cemetery.

== Works ==
- "Contributions to Creole Grammar" in Transactions of the American Philological Association (1869)
- Catalogue of the William Loring Andrews Collection of Early Books in the Library of Yale University (1913)
