= Strykersville, New York =

Hamlet in New York, United States

Coordinates: 42°42′18″N 78°26′54″W

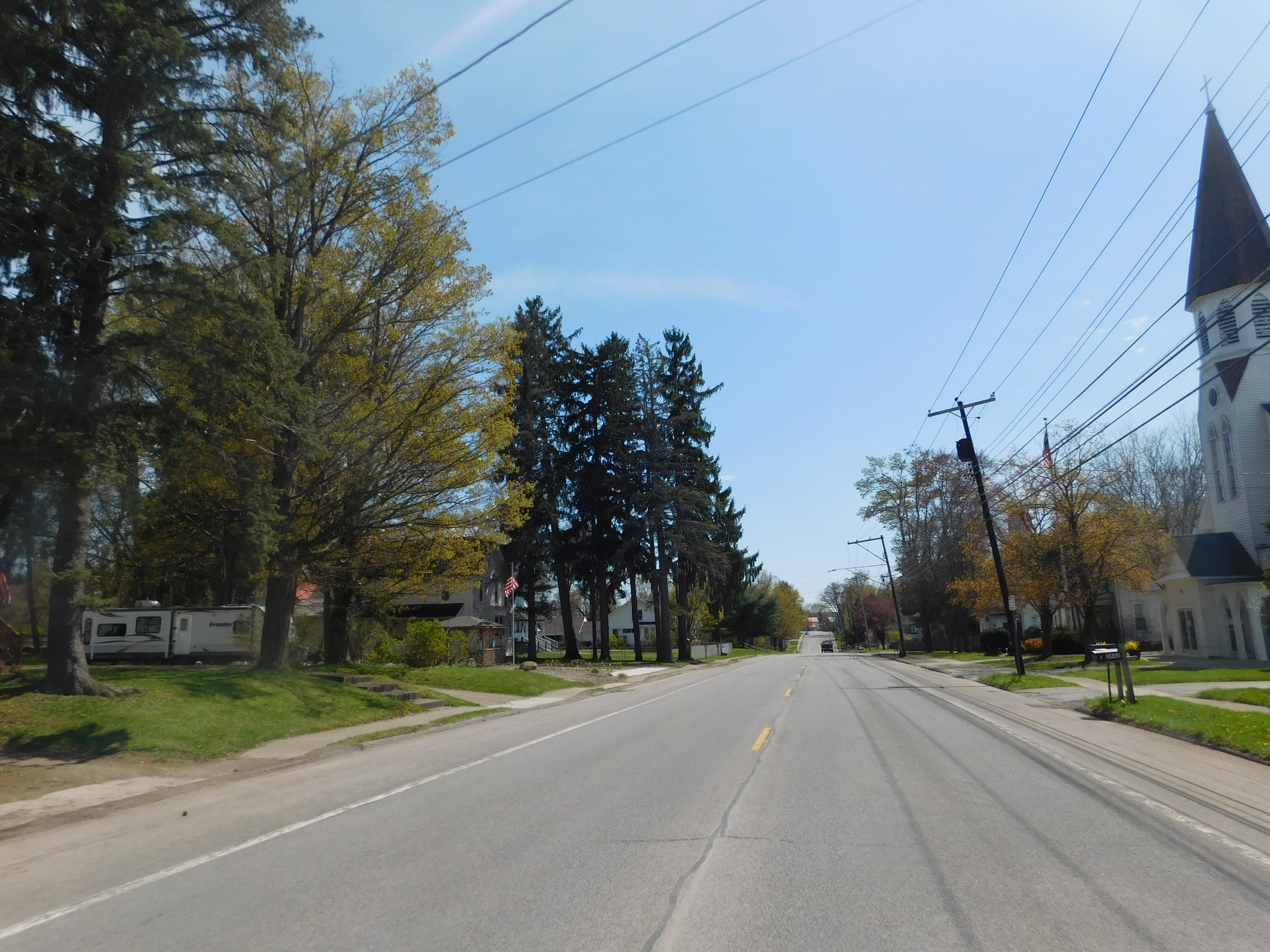
NY 78 southbound through Strykersville

Strykersville is a hamlet (and census-designated place) located within the town of Sheldon, with a small southern portion in the Town of Java, in the western part of Wyoming County, New York, United States. As of the 2020 census, Strykersville had a population of 682. It is located on New York State Route 78.

== Notable people ==
- Edward Gaylord Bourne, historian who was born in Strykersville
- Jim Konstanty, former MLB pitcher and NL MVP who was born in Strykersville
