= Hezekiah Augur =

American sculptor and inventor (1791–1858)

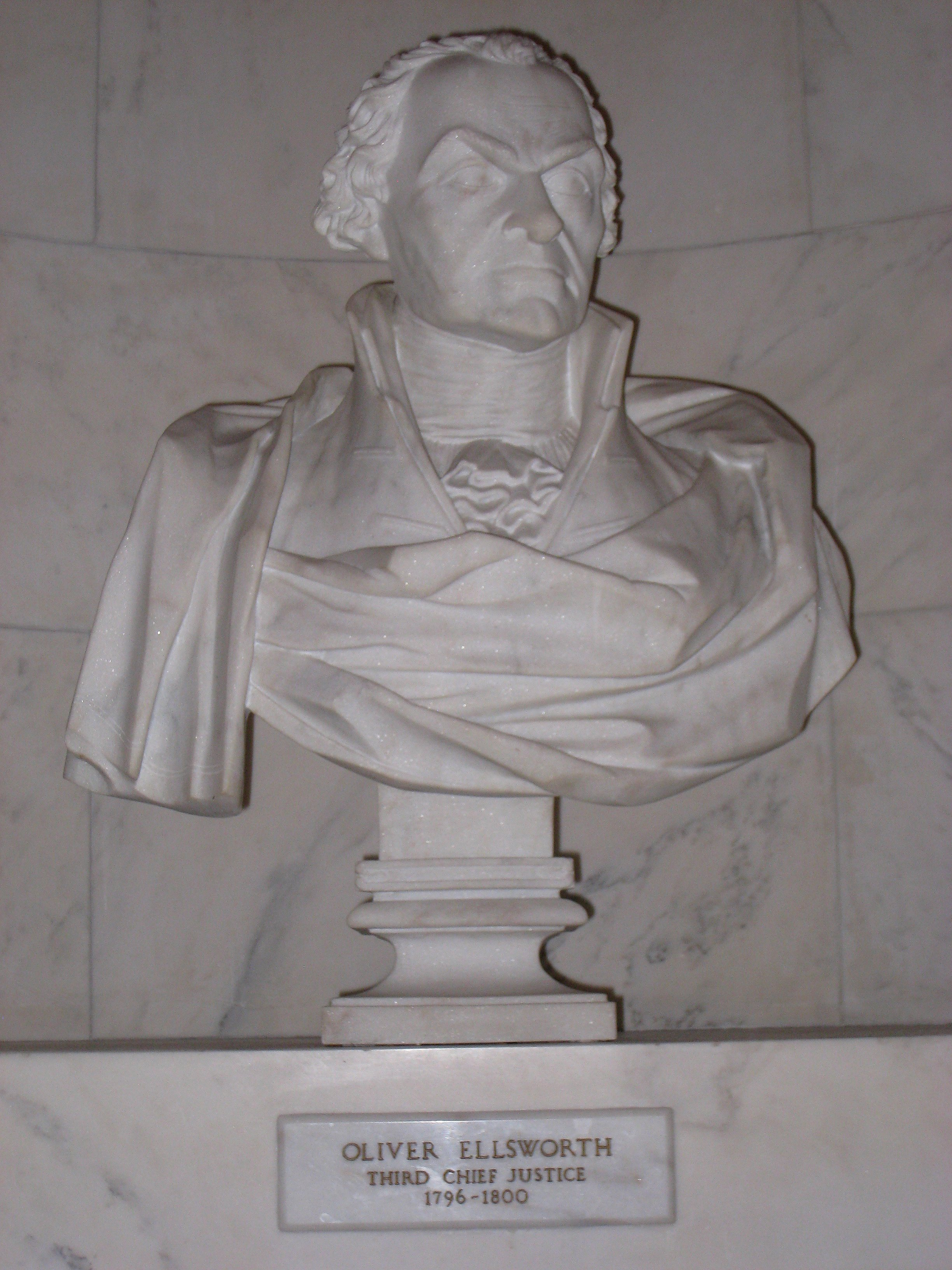
- Oliver Ellsworth bust, by Hezekiah Augur
- Born: February 21, 1791; New Haven, Connecticut
- Died: January 10, 1858 (aged 66)
- Known for: Sculpture

Hezekiah Augur (February 21, 1791 – January 10, 1858) was an early American sculptor and inventor. He was a self-taught sculptor and, unlike many other 19th-century American sculptors, did not travel to Europe, but spent his entire career in New Haven.

== Life ==
Augur was born in New Haven, Connecticut. The son of a carpenter, he learned his trade as a woodcarver, carving table legs and other furniture ornament. Borrowing $2,000 from his father, he was invited to join a grocery store business venture. Three years later he discovered, to his shock and amazement, that not only was his money gone, but that he owed his partners $7,000. While thus engaged he invented a lace-making machine that lifted the financial burdens that he had assumed and thus allowed him to take up carving full-time. Around that time he also invented a machine for carving piano legs. He switched to marble later in his career, being among the first native born Americans to do so. Chauncey Ives studied briefly with Augur.

== Works ==
Augur's bust of Supreme Court Justice Oliver Ellsworth (c. 1837) is housed in the Old Supreme Court Chamber in the United States United States Capitol. A portrait of Alexander Metcalf Fisher (c. 1827) and a neo-classical grouping, Jephthah and His Daughter (c. 1832), are in the Yale University art collection, and in 1833 Auger received an honorary degree from Yale University. He died on January 10, 1858, in New Haven and is buried in Grove Street Cemetery. He was a member of the Connecticut Academy of Arts and Sciences.

== Sources ==
- Compilation of Works of Art and Other Objects in the United States Capitol, Prepared by the Architect of the Capitol under the Joint Committee on the Library, United States Government Printing House, Washington, 1965
- Craven, Wayne, Sculpture in America, Thomas Y. Crowell Co, NY, NY 1968
- Augur, E. P., The Augur Family (Middletown, Connecticut, 1904)
- Freedman, Frank & Bernstein, American Sculpture at Yale University, Yale University Art Gallery, New Haven, Connecticut, 1992
- Greenthal, Kozol, Rameirez & Fairbanks, American Figurative Sculpture in the Museum of Fine Arts, Boston, Museum of Fine Arts, Boston 1986
- Johnson, Rossiter, ed. (1906). "Augur, Hezekiah". The Biographical Dictionary of America. Vol. 1. Boston: American Biographical Society. p. 165.
- Opitz, Glenn B, Editor, Mantle Fielding’s Dictionary of American Painters, Sculptors & Engravers, Apollo Book, Poughkeepsie NY, 1986
- Taft, Lorado, The History of American Sculpture, MacMillan Co., New York, NY 1925
- Augur, Hezekiah (21 Feb 1791) in The Grove Encyclopedia of American Art ISBN 9780195335798
