= Willard G. Van Name =

American conservationist (1872 - 1959)

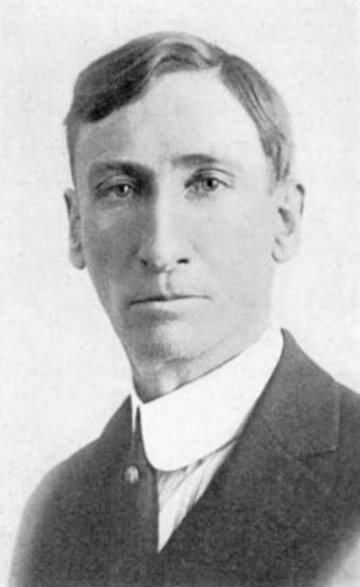
Van Name, c. 1922

Willard Gibbs Van Name (April 18, 1872 - April 25, 1959) was an American biologist and conservationist active in the national conservation movement from the 1920s into the 1950s. In 1929, he and Rosalie Edge established the Emergency Conservation Committee (ECC) to combat inadequate wildlife protection policies and to expose the ineffectiveness of major conservation groups at the time, particularly the National Association of Audubon Societies (NAAS - now the National Audubon Society). In addition to successfully challenging NAAS, over two decades the ECC successfully advocated for the creation of Olympic (Washington) and Kings Canyon (California) National Parks, the expansion of existing national parks including Yosemite, and the preservation of other notable natural areas. The ECC was also effective in pressing for regulations to protect wildlife, including opposing the then prevalent practice of systematic predator eradication. The ECC was largely financed by Van Name in its early years.

In 1934, with financial assistance from Van Name, Edge established the world's first preserve for birds of prey - Hawk Mountain Sanctuary, near Kempton. Pennsylvania. The original lease of the land comprising the sanctuary was largely paid for by Van Name, originally as a loan but ultimately as a donation to purchase the property the following year.

Edge and the ECC were considered the most militant conservationist force of the time, serving as a model for the hard-core environmentalists of subsequent generations, according to long-time Sierra Club leader David Brower.

== Biography ==
Van Name was a biologist at the American Museum of Natural History (AMNH) in New York City specializing in invertebrates and crustaceans including ascidiacea and isopoda. He was an assistant in the Department of Invertebrate Zoology from 1916-21 and an associate curator from 1926 until his retirement in 1942. He wrote over two dozen articles, pamphlets, journals and books.

Van Name was born in 1872, the first son of Addison Van Name, an American scholar who was University Librarian of Yale University from 1865 to 1904. His mother Julia was the daughter of Josiah Willard Gibbs Sr. and the sister of Josiah Willard Gibbs, both Yale professors.

Van Name lived in New York for most of his life. He was unmarried. He retired from the AMNH in 1942 and became physically incapacitated after fracturing his hip in 1954. He died on April 26, 1959.

== Conservation work ==
In 1929, Van Name and two colleagues from the AMNH, W. DeWitt Miller and Davis Quinn, published a pamphlet entitled A Crisis in Conservation: Serious Danger of Extinction of Many North American Birds. The pamphlet criticized NAAS for opposing measures to regulate and restrict hunting practices that were contributing to the precipitous drop in wild game bird populations in America during that time. Miller was killed in a motorcycle accident shortly after the pamphlet was published. The AMNH, which shared directors with the NAAS, directed Van Name to stop publishing independently unless he obtained prior approval.

Rosalie Edge, a society matron and suffragette who had become an avid birder in her 30s, read A Crisis in Conservation and was outraged. She contacted Van Name, and together they decided to form the ECC, in large part to give Van Name an outlet for publishing his conservation materials without using his name. Over the next two decades the ECC published over 100 pamphlets, many written by Van Name, advocating for various conservation causes.

Edge and the ECC were considered the most militant conservationist force of the time, a model for the dedicated conservationists of subsequent generations, according to conservationist Bill McKibben who wrote, "Edge is one of the people who made Rachel Carson and David Brower possible". Brower himself described Edge and the ECC as "the leading model of conservation advocacy of his youth".

Rosalie Edge was the public face of the ECC's conservation contributions, but Van Name was her "mentor and totally supported her work for many years" according to Edge's son Peter: "Each contributed enormously to their partnership, and together they could do what neither could do separately".

Irving Brant—a journalist who later became a conservation advisor to President Franklin Delano Roosevelt and to his Interior Secretary, Harold Ickes—was an early member of the ECC and wrote a number of its pamphlets, while also serving in the nominal position of treasurer. Brant's influence gave Edge and Van Name access to the highest levels of American government during the 1930s.

Brant describes Van Name as the "spiritual godfather and non-wealthy financial backer" of the ECC, adding: "Brilliantly endowed with insight and foresight, Van Name had been the first to call public attention to virtually every assault on natural resources in the 1920s".

In the early 1930s Edge, a life member of the NAAS, successfully sued NAAS for access to its membership lists as part of an effort to change the organization's leadership. These became the initial mailing list for the ECC's pamphlets. She and Van Name—with the support of Brant, William Hornaday, and other prominent conservationists—continued to attack the NAAS for not supporting regulations limiting hunting and for practices such as profiting from fur trapping on the society's "nature preserve" in Louisiana. In the next few years, NAAS membership declined by over half. Finally, in 1934 the head of NAAS Thomas Gilbert Pearson, resigned.

ECC pamphlets were typically illustrated booklets of 12 to 26 pages, each on an individual conservation issue. Some examples of titles are: United States Biological Survey: Destruction, not Scientific Investigation and Conservation, now its Chief Activity (1930); Compromised Conservation: Can the Audubon Society Explain? (1930); Shotgun Conservation (1931); and The Slaughter of the Yellowstone Park Pelicans (1932). Most of the early pamphlets were attributed to Edge, Brant, or were uncredited.

The ECC garnered support from many prominent conservationists of the time, but initially many were reluctant to be identified due to affiliations with some of the organizations the ECC attacked. Prominent early supporters included Hornaday, Jay "Ding" Darling, Roger Tory Peterson, Charles C. Adams and Richard Pough.

Van Name had a number of letters and articles published by the New York Times and other publications, such as Science magazine. His first letter published in the New York Times, in 1923, decried lax governmental oversight and protection of National Parks, citing federal actions in 1903 and 1906 to shrink Yosemite National Park and the damming of the park's Hetch-Hetchy Valley "by San Francisco water power interests, masquerading under the cover of a public enterprise". He argued that "[n]ot even the organizations claiming to be looking out for the safety of the parks can be too implicitly trusted, for the tentacles of the interests having schemes against the park have penetrated many of these". The New York Times published a positive response to Van Name's letter from Robert Underwood Johnson, the writer, conservationist, and long-time editor of The Century Magazine who had been John Muir's mentor, friend and publisher.

In all, the New York Times published over a dozen letters from Van Name on a variety of conservation issues. Its last mention of him during his life time, in 1954, credits his role in helping to save the Calaveras South Grove of sequoias after a six-year battle. The grove has since become part of a California state park.

In addition to A Crisis in Conservation, Van Name published in 1929 a book, Vanishing Forest Reserves: Problems of the National Forests and National Parks, which criticized the stewardship by the U.S. Forest Service and National Park Service of the nation's public forests. He played a continuing role in the battle leading up to the creation of Olympic National Park. Vanishing Forest Reserves criticized the Forest Service for allowing timber harvesting on the Olympic Peninsula, which brought the issue to the attention of conservationists nationwide. His book "drew the National Park Service into the fray.... Letters poured into the Department of the Interior daily".

In 1934, the ECC anonymously published a pamphlet written by Van Name, The Proposed Olympic National Park, which tied the protection of old growth timber to the preservation of the Roosevelt Elk indigenous to the peninsula. A bill was introduced to create a park largely using borders proposed by Van Name. After another protracted battle, the bill's sponsor proposed a compromise bill that substantially reduced the size of the proposed park. The ECC published Double Crossing Mount Olympus National Park (1936) in response, and the sponsor reversed his position. In 1938, the ECC published The Olympic Forests for a National Park. Later that year FDR signed the bill creating the park, containing all but one section proposed by Van Name.

In 1936, Edge and Van Name had a falling out over tactics related to a campaign to save an 8,000 acre grove of Sugar Pines adjacent to Yosemite National Park. "Although Van Name and Edge could no longer tolerate speaking to each other, Van Name never withdrew his support from the ECC...." A 1948 profile of Edge published in The New Yorker, however, quotes Van Name: "'We quarrel,' he said recently. 'We quarrel a good deal. But not for long. She's unique in the field. She's the only honest, unselfish, indomitable hellcat in the history of conservation.'"

The ECC and Van Name continued to work in parallel and were active in the fight to create Kings Canyon National Park and save various groves of old growth redwoods in California. In 1939 the ECC published an anonymous booklet, The Proposed John Muir-Kings Canyon National Park. The bill creating the park was signed by Roosevelt in 1940.

In 1932, ornithologist and conservationist Richard Pough observed the annual tradition of hundreds of shooters lining up on a ridge in eastern Pennsylvania to shoot down as many as possible of the thousands of migrating hawks, eagles and falcons that overfly the ridge during the annual migration in late summer and fall. Sickened by the sight, Pough sought support from various regional and national conservation organizations, including NAAS, to prevent the slaughter. Despite declarations of support, Pough was unable to incite concrete action. He contacted Rosalie Edge, who initially leased the entire ridge in 1934 for $500 provided by Van Name and bought it a year later for $3000. The ridge was established as the world's first raptor sanctuary, Hawk Mountain Sanctuary, and Edge hired Maurice Broun to act as caretaker.

== Legacy ==
Multiple sources have described Van Name as a misanthropic, suspicious individual. Dyana Furmansky, Edge's biographer, describes Van Name as homosexual, which "may have been why conventional scientists and manly sportsmen distrusted him....". His friend Irving Brant later wrote of him that: "Experience bred a touch of bitterness in him, along with a tendency to mistake blindness and self-interest for malevolence". A 2006 National Park Service Administrative History of Olympic National Park describes Van Name as an "eccentric and reclusive bachelor" with a "quixotic and even desperate air" who "understood the idea of national parks in a very narrow way".

A 230-word New York Times obituary of Van Name references his career at the American Museum of Natural History and his many letters to the Times addressing various conservation issues. The obituary contains no mention whatsoever of the Emergency Conservation Committee, Rosalie Edge, or Hawk Mountain Sanctuary.

After the New York Times obituary was published, a letter from Irving Brant was published on May 24, 1959. It opened:

When great and lifelong service to the public is combined with self-effacement, it is possible for a man to depart from this earth so quietly that hardly anybody knows what he has done for those who remain behind.... Few of those who knew Dr. Van Name as a scientist were aware that for a great part of his adult life he devoted the major share of his income and much of his time and energy to a ceaseless campaign against commercial raids on the national park system, to the preservation of scenic areas threatened with destruction, and in behalf of the menaced wildlife of the United States.
