= Waldron DeWitt Miller =

American ornithologist

Waldron DeWitt Miller (4 August 1879 – 7 August 1929) was an American ornithologist.

He served as an associate curator at the American Museum of Natural History. Along with Alexander Wetmore he developed a scheme for classifying birds for the American Ornithologists' Union (A.O.U. Check-List).

== Biography ==
Miller, son of a major, grew up in Plainfield, New Jersey and began observing birds and their habitats, such as the Western wood pewee. He later graduated from the East Greenwich Academy and enrolled in an insurance company in New York City. Works of John Burroughs deepened his interest in ornithology and he became associate member of the American Ornithologists' Union in 1896 and a corresponding member of the Delaware Valley Ornithological Club in Philadelphia in 1900. He also co-founded the John James Audubon Society of New Jersey in 1897 and served as its vice president until his death.

Miller met Frank Michler Chapman via whom he became assistant in the Department of Mammalogy and Ornithology at the American Museum of Natural History in 1903. Hitherto having mainly studied birds of the east coast of the United States, reading the works of Elliott Coues further developed his interest in general ornithology. He subsequently worked as a taxidermist, particularly focusing on birds from Mexico and Panama.

He became assistant curator of the A.O.U. in 1911 and finally an associate curator at the American Museum in 1917.

In 1917, he undertook a field study of avian life in Nicaragua with Ludlow Griscom, who had just become assistant curator at the American Museum. This resulted in a comprehensive report on the living conditions, local distributions, relationships, and diet of the local birds.

He also worked on the classification of feathers based on descriptions of kingfishers and woodpeckers. In 1922, he became a foreign member of the British Ornithologists' Union (BOU). Together with Alexander Wetmore, he developed a scheme for classifying birds for the American Ornithologists' Union (A.O.U. Check-List). This list was begun in 1926 with the classification of crows and ravens.

He also engaged in cataloging falcons and general bird studies in the state of New Jersey. In 1928, he and Willard Gibbs Van Name undertook an extensive field study in the forested areas of the western United States, also addressing issues of forest conservation. He also wrote a comprehensive treatise on the occurrence of snakes in New Jersey.

Miller died at St. Peter's Hospital, New Jersey after a road accident on August 4, 1929.

== Works ==
- List of Birds Collected in Southern Sinaloa, Mexico, by J.H. Batty, During 1903-1904, 1905
- List of Birds Collected in Northwestern Durango, Mexico, by J.H. Batty, During 1903, 1906
- A Review of the Manakins of the Genus Chiroxiphia, 1908
- A Revision of the Classification of the Kingfishers, 1912
- Notes on Ptilosis: With Special Reference to the Feathering of the Wing, 1915
- Three New Genera of Birds, 1915
- Descriptions of Proposed New Birds from Central America, with Notes on Other Little-known Forms, Mitautor Ludlow Griscom, 1921
- Further Notes on Ptilosis, 1924
- Variations in the Structure of the Aftershaft and Their Taxonomic Value, 1924
- Descriptions of New Birds from Nicaragua, Mitautor Ludlow Griscom, 1925
- Notes on Central American Birds, with Descriptions of New Forms, Mitautor Ludlow Griscom, 1925
- Field Notes of Waldron DeWitt Miller on the Snakes of New Jersey, 1926, Neuauflage 1937 (Herausgeberin Adelaide Bertha Heyen)
- A Crisis in Conservation: Serious Danger of Extinction of Many North American Birds, Mitautoren Willard Gibbs Van Name und Davis Quinn, 1929
- The Scansorial Foot of the Woodpeckers, with Comments on the Evolution of Perching and Climbing Feet in Birds, 1931, Neuauflage 1959 (Herausgeber Walter Joseph Bock)
