= Samuel Peck (daguerreotypist) =

- Born: March 3, 1813
- Died: July 22, 1879 (aged 66); New Haven, Connecticut, U.S.
- Resting place: Grove Street Cemetery
- Other name: Samuel H. Peck
- Occupations: photographer, photo case manufacturer, gallery owner
- Employer(s): Samuel Peck & Co.

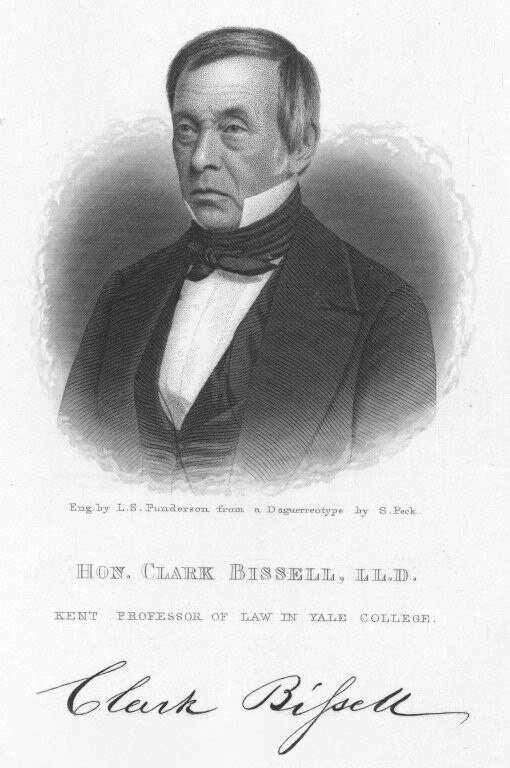
Engraving of Clark Bissell by L. S. Punderson, made from a daguerreotype by Peck

Samuel Peck (1813–1879), was an American 19th-century photographer, artist, businessperson, photo case manufacturer, and gallery owner. He was based in New Haven, Connecticut and produced daguerreotypes before moving into the manufacture of cases for daguerreotypes as, Samuel Peck & Co. (also written as S. Peck & Co. and Samuel Peck and Company).

== Biography ==
Samuel Peck & Co. was in operation in New Haven, from 1844 to 1857. In 1844, Peck opened a photo gallery, where he worked as a daguerreotypist. Starting on April 30, 1850, Peck had secured patents for his photo case designs. Peck patented the first thermoplastic case, made from fine sawdust, shellac, and dye that were pressed and heated with steam to moldable forms. They are referred to as union cases and are collectable.

Peck and his brother-in-law Halvor Halvorson produced daguerreotype cases molded from thermoplastic. One of his cases lists Massachusetts. One of their union case designs was inspired by a work of Danish sculptor Bertel Thorvaldsen (1770–1844).

Daguerreotypes and their cases were supplanted by the less costly paper photograph industry and cartes de visite.

== Music Hall ==
In 1860 Peck built the Music Hall in New Haven; the building was later named the Grand Opera House, which burned down in a fire in 1915. The Grand Opera House was used for social functions, political meetings, and religious meetings for 50 years and was important to the city of New Haven.

== Collections ==
Work by Samuel Peck and Samuel Peck & Co. are in Harvard University's Houghton Library collection, including a daguerreotype portrait in one of Peck and Halvorsen's thermoplastic cases; as well as in the collection at the Smithsonian American Art Museum. The New Haven Museum and Historical Society has an entire collection of Peck's daguerreotype cases.

== See also ==
- Gutta-percha
- Gutta Percha Company
- History of photography
