= Charles Montague Bakewell =

American politician (1867–1957)

Member of the U.S. House of Representatives from Connecticut's at-large district
- In office March 4, 1933 – January 3, 1935
- Preceded by: District re-established
- Succeeded by: William M. Citron

Personal details
- Born: April 24, 1867 Pittsburgh, Pennsylvania, U.S.
- Died: September 19, 1957 (aged 90) New Haven, Connecticut, U.S.
- Resting place: Grove Street Cemetery
- Party: Republican
- Education: University of California, Berkeley; Harvard University

Charles Montague Bakewell (April 24, 1867 – September 19, 1957) was a university professor and Republican politician who served in the United States House of Representatives.

== Early life ==
Bakewell was born in Pittsburgh on April 24, 1867. He attended the schools of Pittsburgh and the University of Pittsburgh before graduating from the University of California at Berkeley in 1889. He received a master's degree from the University of California in 1891, and his PhD from Harvard University in 1894. From 1894 to 1896, Bakewell attended the Universities of Berlin, Strasbourg, and Paris.

== Academic career ==
Bakewell was a philosophy instructor at Harvard University from 1896 to 1897, and the University of California from 1897 to 1898. From 1898 to 1900, Bakewell was an associate professor at Bryn Mawr College, and he was an associate professor and then professor at the University of California from 1900 to 1905. From 1905 to 1933, Bakewell was a professor at Yale University 1905–1933. In 1910, he served as president of the American Philosophical Association.

== World War I ==
During World War I, Bakewell served under the Italian Commission of the American Red Cross in Italy, holding the ranks of major and deputy commissioner while performing duties as an inspector and historian.

== Political career ==
After the war, Bakewell was elected to the Connecticut State Senate as a Republican, and he served from 1920 to 1924. From 1921 to 1923, he served as chairman of the state commission that revised and codified Connecticut's educational laws.

In 1932, Bakewell was elected to the United States House of Representatives, and he served one term, March 4, 1933, to January 3, 1935. He was an unsuccessful candidate for reelection in 1934. In 1936, he was a delegate to the Republican National Convention.

== Death and burial ==
Bakewell died in New Haven, Connecticut on September 19, 1957, and was buried at Grove Street Cemetery in New Haven.

U.S. House of Representatives
Preceded by District re-established	Member of the U.S. House of Representatives from Connecticut's at-large congressional district 1933–1935	Succeeded by William M. Citron
