= Jennifer Tucker =

American historian and educator

Jennifer Tucker is Professor of Technology, Law, and Visual Culture in the Department of History at Wesleyan University in Connecticut, where she is the founding director of the Center for the Study of Guns and Society (a first-of-its-kind research center, established in 2022). At Wesleyan, she teaches courses on British and American technology, culture, photography, the role of evidence, and aesthetics of justice and historical storytelling.

As a historian, Tucker studies the interrelations of art and science, photography, and mass visual culture, with a specialization in 19th to mid-20th century British, U.S., women’s and gender history, and trans-Pacific history. The common threads in her diverse research fields are the dynamics of visual media in modern history, the nature of evidence, public perceptions and practices of history, and the interrelationships of science, technology, and the law.

Her latest book, The Tichborne Trial’s Many Faces: Photographic Evidence, Facial Recognition, and the Making of Modern Visual Culture, is under contract with Oxford University Press. She has authored or co-edited three other books including A Right to Bear Arms? The Contested Role of History in Contemporary Debates on the Second Amendment, published by the Smithsonian Institution Scholarly Press, the Routledge Handbook of American Violence (forthcoming), and the book Nature Exposed: Photography as Eyewitness in Victorian Science. She has also published more than thirty peer reviewed articles and book chapters, and served as editor of four special issue journals.

In 2023, Tucker was named to the Historians Council on the Constitution at the Brennan Center for Justice, NYU Law School. She is also a Steering Committee Member at the Centre for Nineteenth-Century Studies International, Durham University (UK).

Tucker is a regular opinion contributor to news media outlets such as CNN, MSNBC, The New York Times, and The Wall Street Journal on issues relating to guns and gun violence.

Recent research awards in the past two years include a National Endowment for the Humanities award for a two-year research investigation of the historical design, engineering, and policy discussions of firearms features from 1750 to 2010 (2023); and a Mellon Foundation “Humanities for All Times” Fellowship for a project exploring race, violence, and industrialization in the Connecticut River Valley (2022).

== Works ==
- Nature Exposed: Photography as Eyewitness in Victorian Science (2006)
- A Right to Bear Arms? The Contested Role of History in Contemporary Debates on the Second Amendment (edited with Margaret Vining and Barton C. Hacker, 2019)
