= James Luce Kingsley =

American classical and biblical scholar (1778-1852)

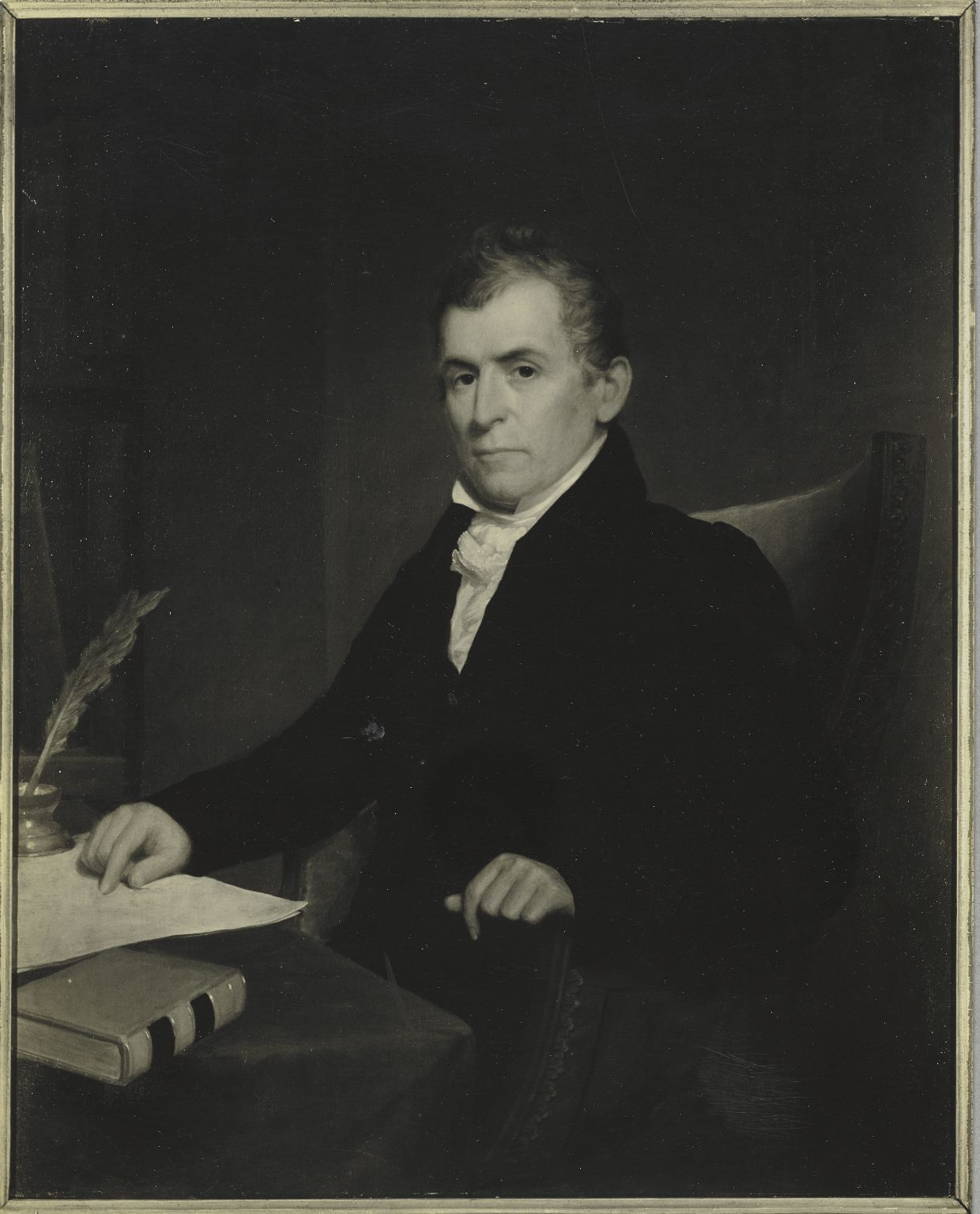
James Luce Kingsley, portrait by Nathaniel Jocelyn

James Luce Kingsley (August 28, 1778 – August 31, 1852) was an American classical and biblical scholar.

== Biography ==
Born in Windham, Connecticut, Kingsley was educated at Williams and Yale, where he was graduated in 1799. He afterward taught for two years, first in Wethersfield, Connecticut and then in Windham, and in 1801 became a tutor at Yale. In 1805 he was appointed to the newly established professorship of Hebrew, Greek, and Latin in there. Kingsley was elected a Fellow of the American Academy of Arts and Sciences in 1825. He was relieved of a part of his duties in 1831, when a separate professorship of Greek was established, and of another part in 1835, when a professorship of sacred literature was founded, but he continued to instruct in Latin until he resigned in 1851. Kingsley died in New Haven, Connecticut.

== Work ==
As a writer of English, Yale president Timothy Dwight called him the “American Addison”; and Yale president Woolsey said of him, “I doubt if any American scholar has ever surpassed him in Latin style.” He published a discourse on the 200th anniversary of the founding of New Haven, April 25, 1838; editions of Tacitus (Philadelphia), and Cicero, De Oratore (New York); and was the author of a history of Yale college in the American Quarterly Register (1835); a life of Ezra Stiles, president of Yale college, in Sparks's series “American Biography.”
