= Emily Sanford Professorship of Comparative Literature and English =

Professorship at Yale University

The Emily Sanford Professorship of Comparative Literature and English is a professorship at Yale University. It was established in 1893 as the "Emily Sanford Professor of English Literature", after Edward C. Billings, a Yale graduate from 1853, left a sum of $70,000 in his will for a professorship position in English literature. He named the position after his wife, Emily Sanford.

As of 2026, the current holder of the professorship is Katie Trumpener.
