= Henry Augustin Beers =

American writer and academic (1847–1926)

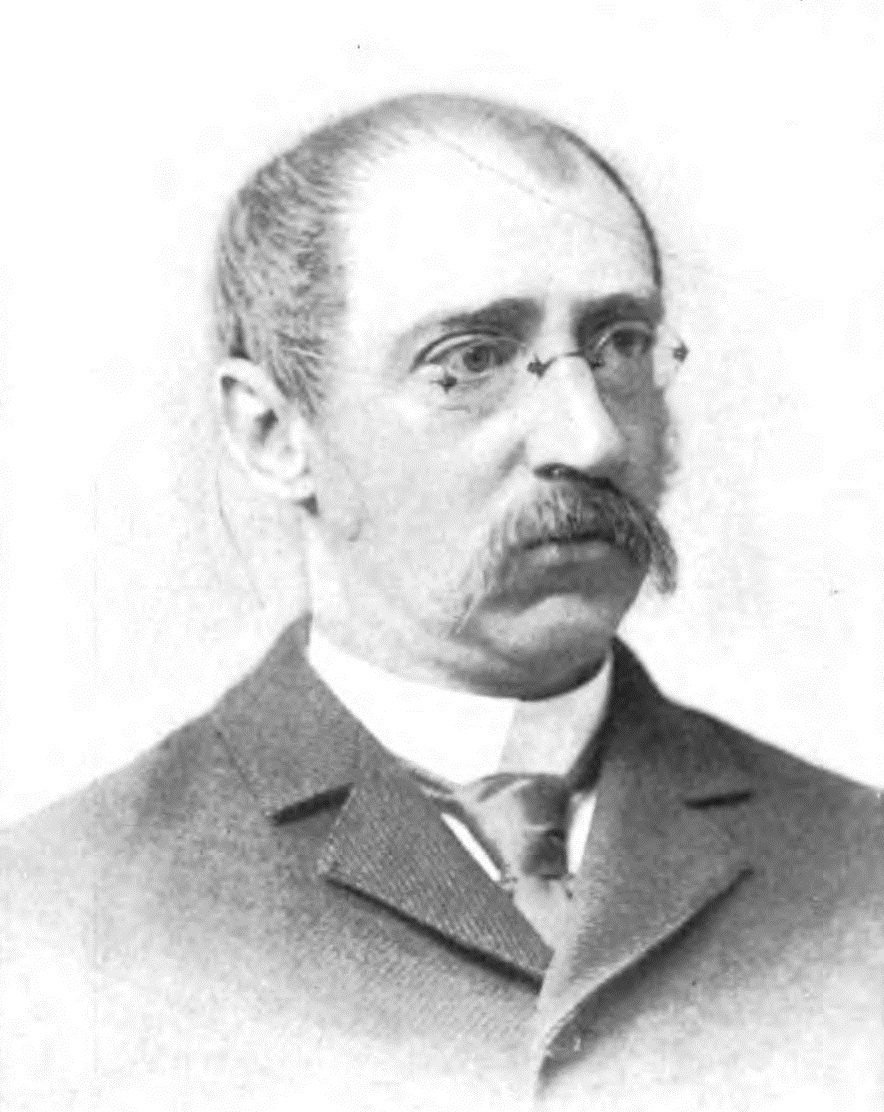
- Henry Augustin Beers circa 1903
- Born: July 2, 1847; Buffalo, New York, US
- Died: September 7, 1926; New Haven, Connecticut, US

Henry Augustin Beers (July 2, 1847 – September 7, 1926) was an American writer and academic.

Henry Augustin Beers was born on July 2, 1847, in Buffalo, New York, to Elizabeth Victoria (Clerc) and George Webster Beers. He received a BA from Yale University in 1869 and was admitted to the New York bar in 1870.

Beers practiced law and worked as tutor before joining Yale's English department in 1875. His writing was both creative and scholarly. Among other works, he wrote poetry and literary history.

Beers died on September 7, 1926, in New Haven, Connecticut.

== Works ==
- A Century of American Literature, 1776–1876 (1877)
- Odds and Ends: Verses Humorous, Occasional and Miscellaneous (1878)
- Split Zephyr (1883)
- Readings From Ruskin: Italy (1885)
- Nathaniel Parker Willis (1885)
- The Thankless Muse (1885)
- An Outline Sketch of English Literature (1886)
- From Chaucer to Tennyson (1890)
- Initial Studies in American Letters (1891)
- A Suburban Pastoral, and Other Tales (1894)
- The Ways of Yale in the Counselship of Plancus (1895)
- A History of English Romanticism in the Eighteenth Century (1898)
- Points at Issue and Some Other Points (1903)
- A Short History of American Literature (1906)
- Milton's Tercentenary (1910)
- The Two Twilights (1917)
- Four Americans: Roosevelt, Hawthorne, Emerson, Whitman (1919)
- The Connecticut Wits, and Other Essays (1920)
