= Schwab (surname) =

Schwab is a German surname, meaning 'Swabian' (inhabitant of Swabia). Notable people with the surname include:

- Albert E. Schwab (1920–1945), United States Marine and war hero
- Alexander Schwab (1887–1943), German politician-activist and commentator-journalist
- Andreas Schwab (born 1973), German politician
- Arthur J. Schwab (born 1946), American judge
- Arthur Tell Schwab (1896–1945), Swiss athlete
- Brice Schwab (born 1990), American football player
- Carlos Schwabe (1877–1926), Swiss-German painter
- Charles M. Schwab (1862–1939), American industrialist
- Charles R. Schwab (born 1937), American investor and financial executive
- Charlotte Schwab (born 1952), Swiss actress
- Christoph Schwab (born 1962), German mathematician
- Corey Schwab (born 1970), Canadian ice hockey player
- Fritz Schwab (1919–2006), Swiss athlete
- George D. Schwab (born 1931), Latvian-American historian
- Gustav Schwab (1792–1850), German writer
- Heinrich W. Schwab (1938–2025), German musicologist
- Howie Schwab (1960–2024), American sports statistician
- Hubert Schwab (born 1982), Swiss racing cyclist
- Ivan R. Schwab, American ophthalmologist
- John Schwab (born 1972), American actor, voice actor, producer and musician
- John Christopher Schwab (1865–1916), American librarian and historian
- Katharine Fisher Schwab (1898–1990), American naval officer
- Keith Schwab (born 1968), American quantum physicist
- Klaus Schwab (born 1938), German economist, founder of the World Economic Forum
- Les Schwab (1917–2007), American businessman
- Mark Dean Schwab (1968–2008), executed American murderer
- Matthias Schwab (born 1994), Austrian golfer
- Matthias Schwab (pharmacologist) (born 1963), German clinical pharmacologist
- Michael Schwab, German-American labor organizer and anarchist
- Michael Schwab (designer) (born 1952), American graphic designer and illustrator
- Moïse Schwab (1839–1918), French librarian and author
- Nicole Schwab (born 1975), Swiss businesswoman and author
- Peter Schwab (born 1960), Australian rules footballer and coach
- Scott Schwab (born 1972), American politician
- Shimon Schwab (1908–1993), German-American Orthodox rabbi
- Sigi Schwab (born 1940), German guitarist and composer
- Stefan Schwab (born 1990), Austrian footballer
- Susan Schwab (born 1955), American politician
- V. E. Schwab (born 1987), American author
- Werner Schwab (1958–1994), Austrian writer

== See also ==
- Schwabe, a surname
- Šváb, a surname with the same etymology
