= Franz Seraph Stirnbrand =

German painter (c. 1788/94 – 1882)

Franz Seraph Stirnbrand (c. 1788/94 – 2 August 1882, Stuttgart) was a German portrait painter. Of unknown parentage, he was given the name "Stirnbrand" (brow burn) when he was baptized, in recognition of a scar on his forehead; the result of a childhood accident.

== Early life ==
Found abandoned in a ditch, he was presumed to be the illegitimate son of a Croatian soldier from a unit stationed nearby, and was raised as a foster child by a local tax official named Johann Baptist Röser. His first art lessons came from Philipp Friedrich von Hetsch, who was resting in Enns at the home of one of Rösers relatives, on the way back to Germany from Italy. In 1805, he was apprenticed to a decorative house painter in Linz, where he was able to take drawing lessons on Sundays. He was offered a place at the Academy of Fine Arts, Vienna, but couldn't accept for lack of adequate financial support. He remained with the house painter until he became a journeyman.

== Career ==
Faced with military conscription, he fled to Frankfurt where he found work in a tin factory, painting portraits of famous people on cans and cups. He also worked on making connections for his personal career but, with business down due to the Russian Campaign, he lost his job and moved to Stuttgart, where he worked as a portrait painter. By 1816, he had earned enough to make a visit home, then returned to Stuttgart after a short stay in Karlsruhe. Once he was settled there, he was able to obtain the patronage of the Duchess Wilhelmine, wife of Duke William Frederick Philip of Württemberg. Their sons, Count Alexander and Count Wilhelm (Later the Duke of Urach), were also frequent customers. During this time, he travelled extensively; visiting Belgium, Paris and Rome, where he painted Pope Leo XII. Eventually, commissions for his portraits extended throughout the nobility, the upper civil service and theatrical circles. A few orders even came from King William I of Württemberg.

== Personal life ==
In 1830, he built his own home and hosted salons with many notable guests from the fields of art, music and theater such as Nikolaus Lenau, Franz von Dingelstedt and Friedrich Wilhelm Hackländer. In 1838, he married.

== Gallery ==
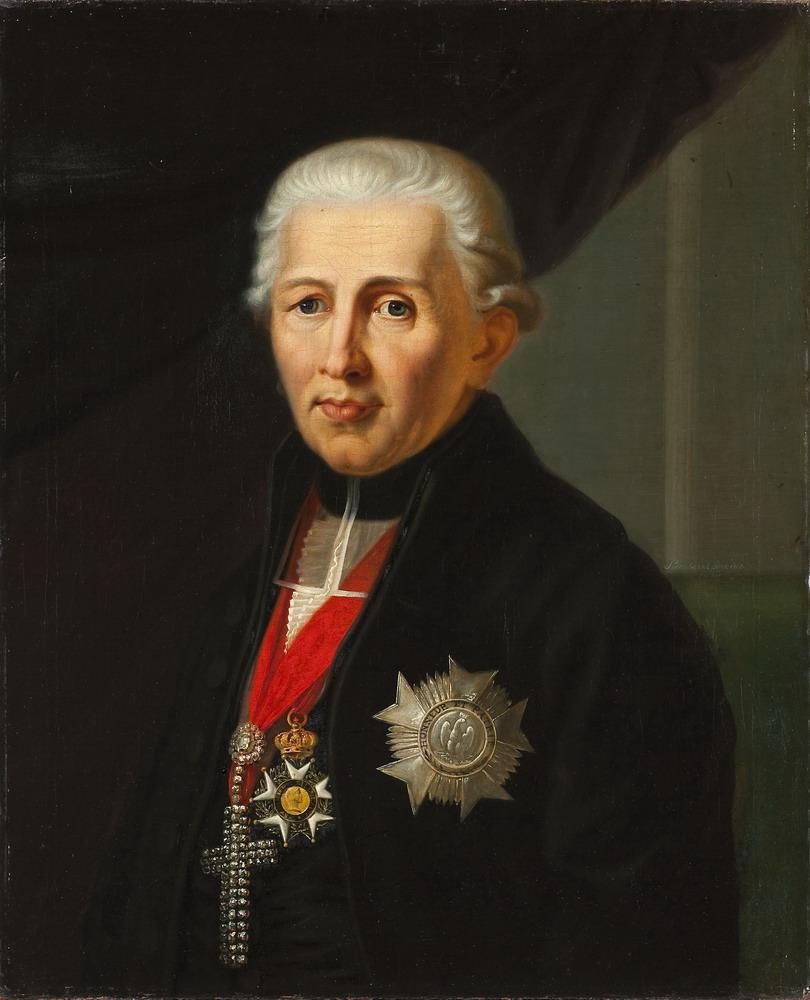
Portrait of Karl Theodor Anton Maria von Dalberg, 1812

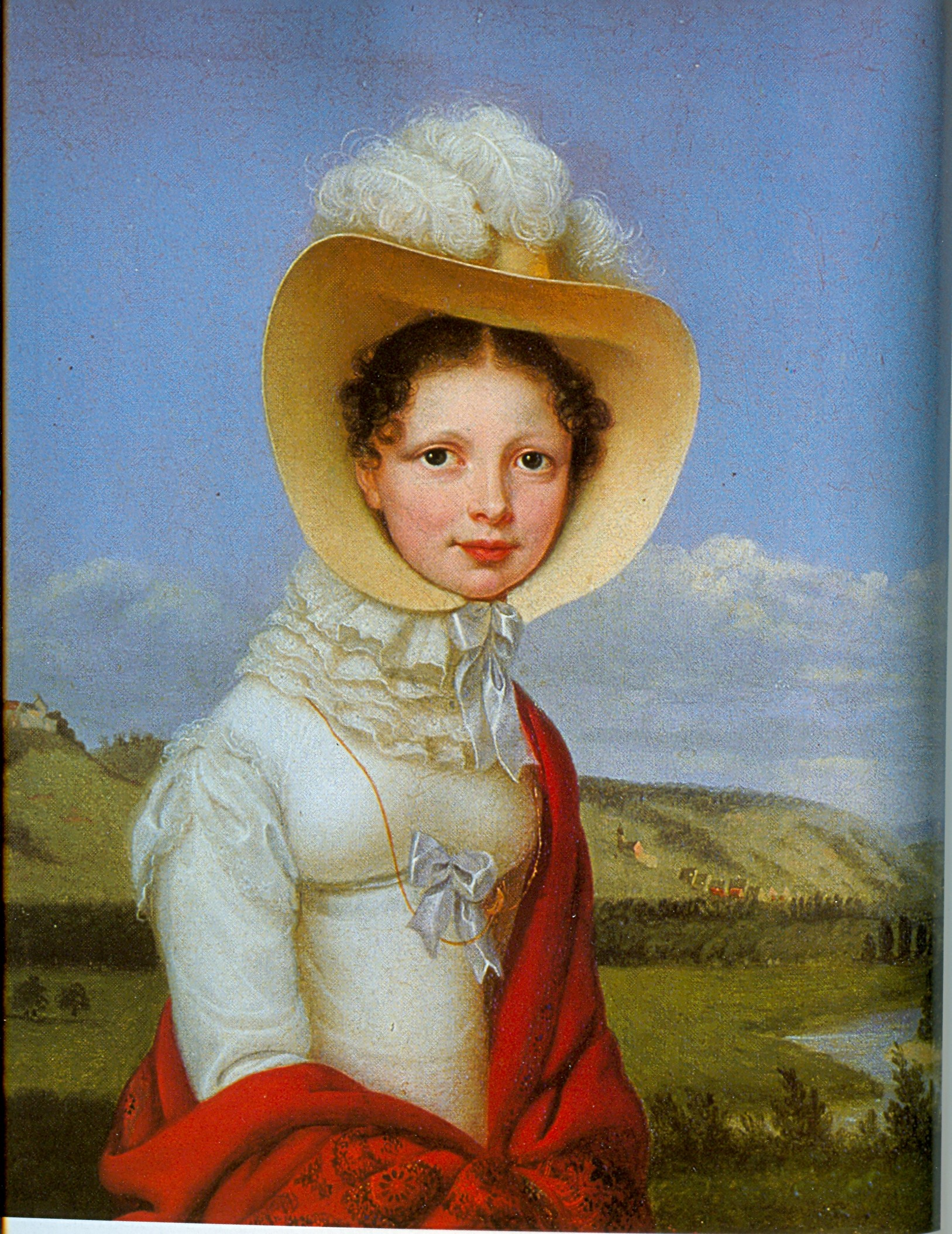
Queen Katharina of Württemberg, 1819

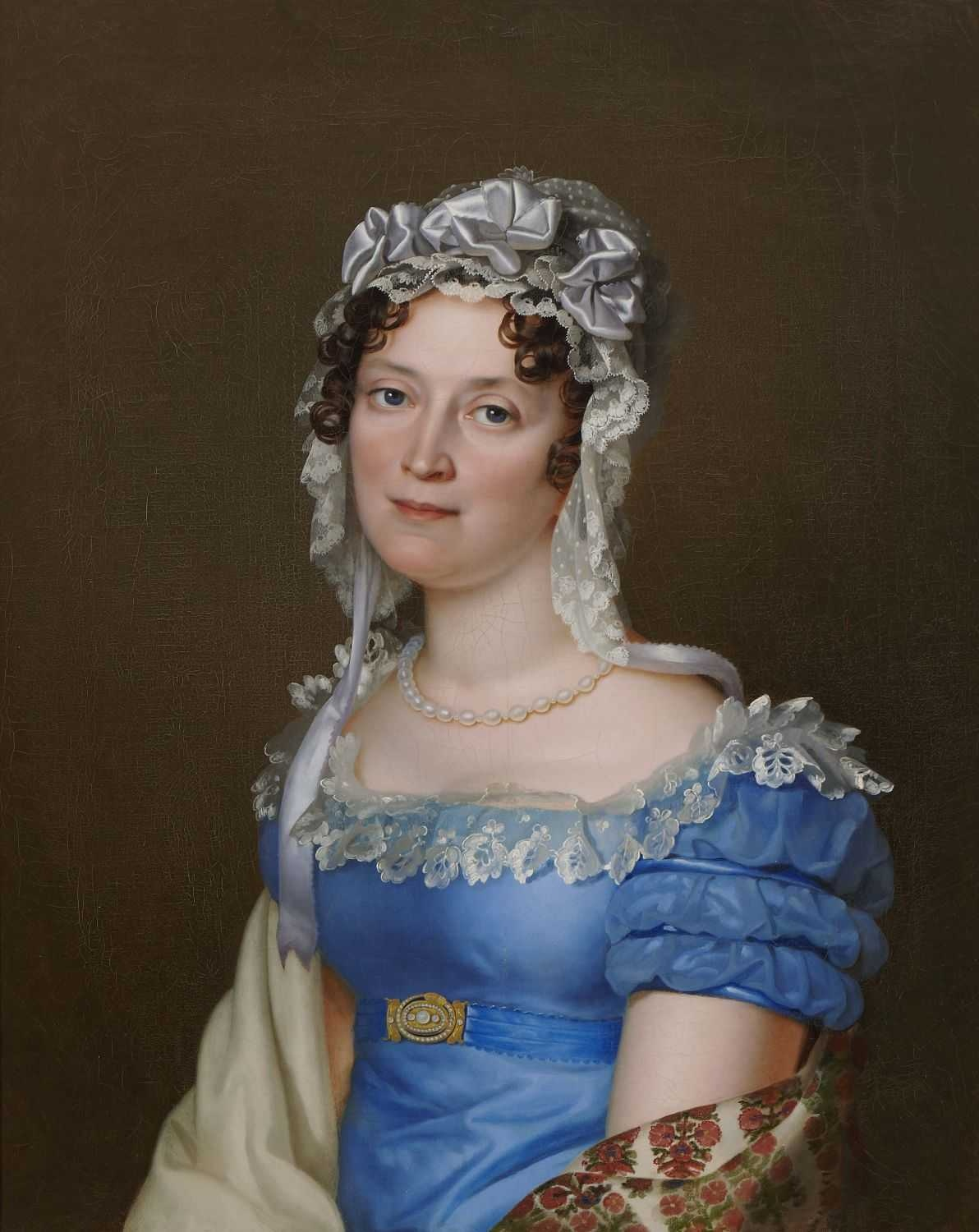
Portrait of Princess Catharina of Württemberg, c. 1820s

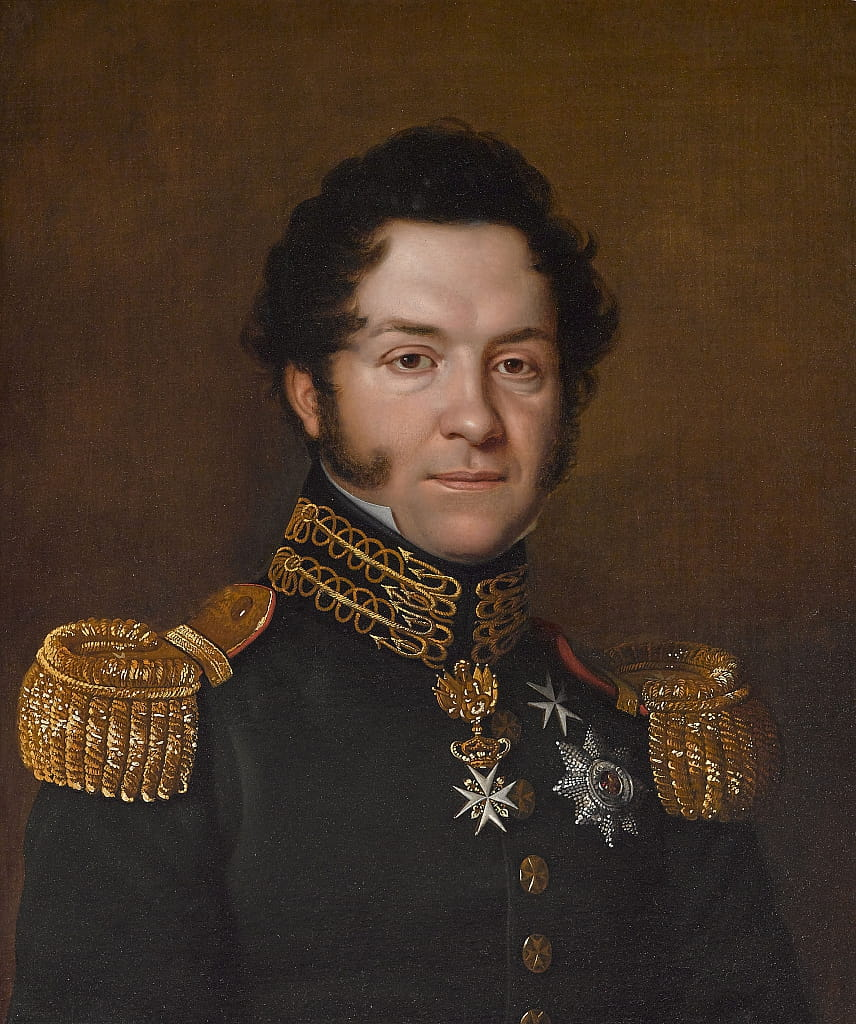
Portrait of Jean Noé Godefroy de Polier-Vernand, 1823

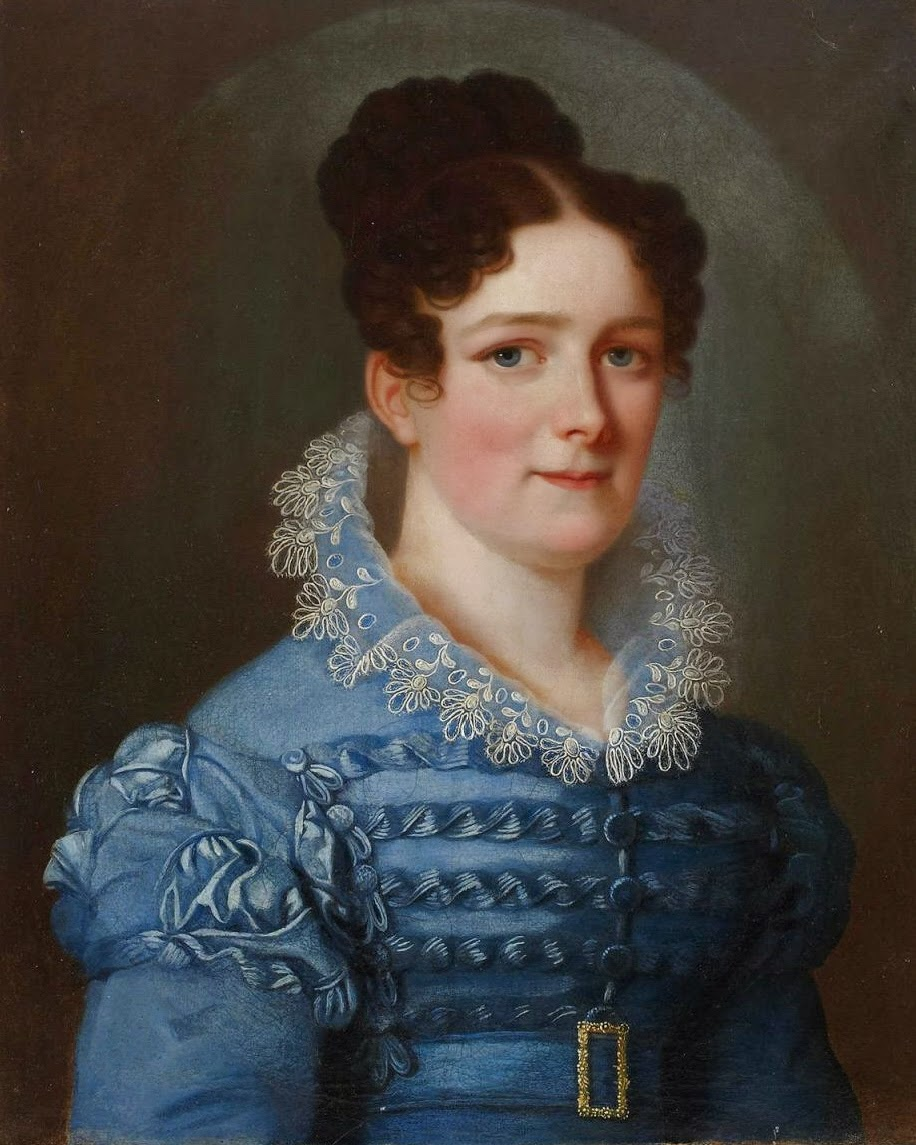
Portrait of Friederike Dorothea von Baden, 1824

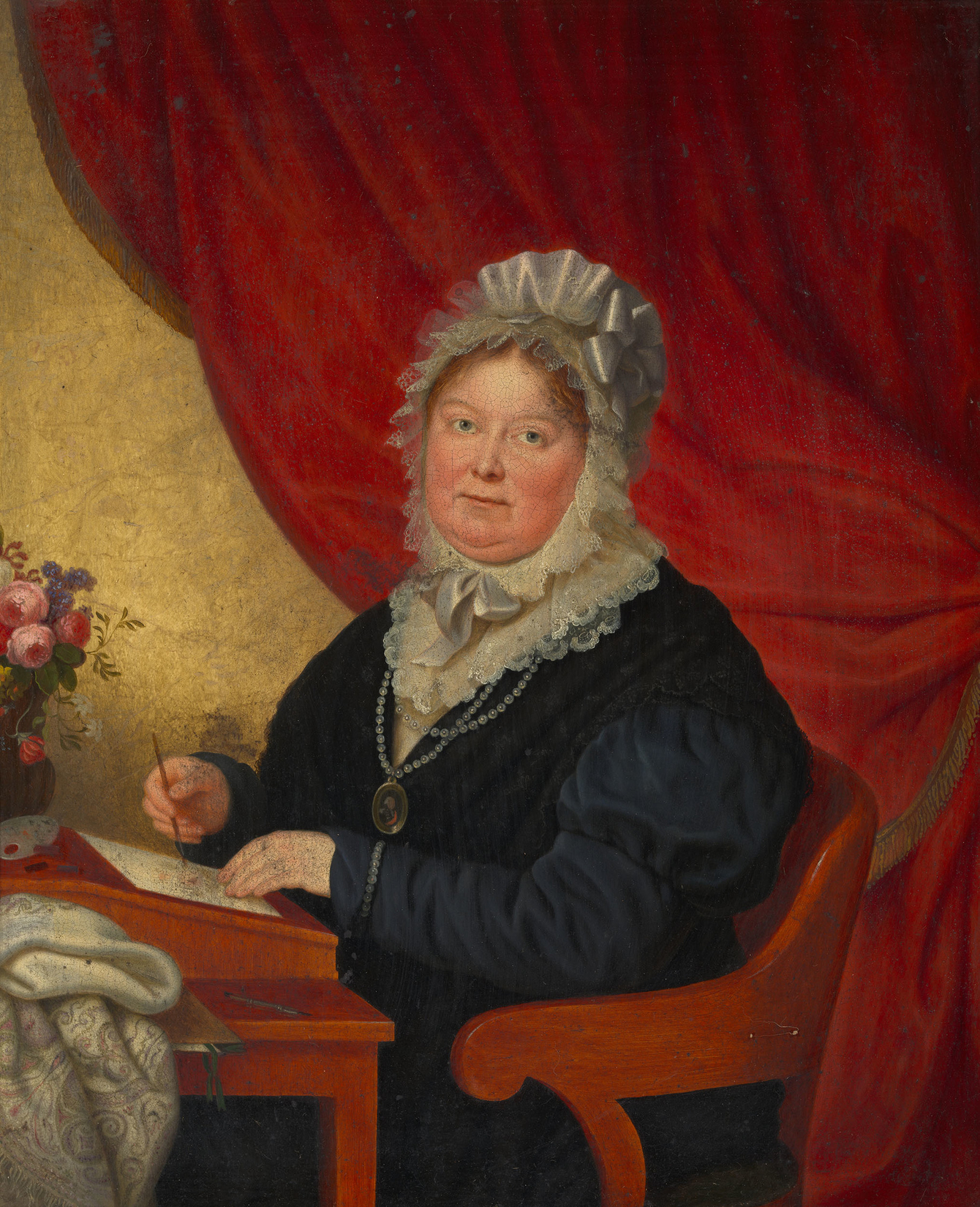
Portrait of Charlotte, Princess Royal, Dowager Queen of Würrtemberg, 1826

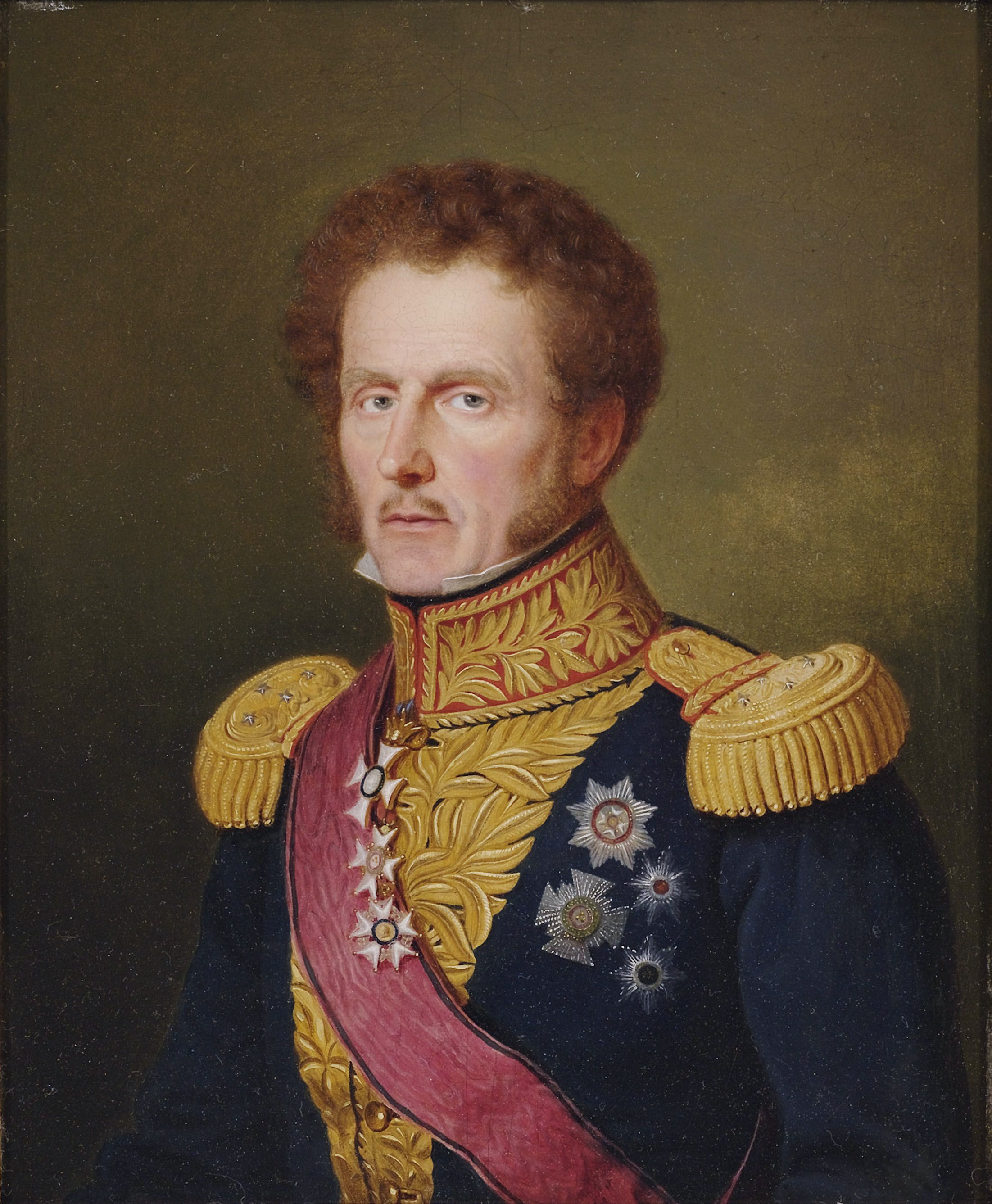
Portrait of Ernst von Hügel, 1829

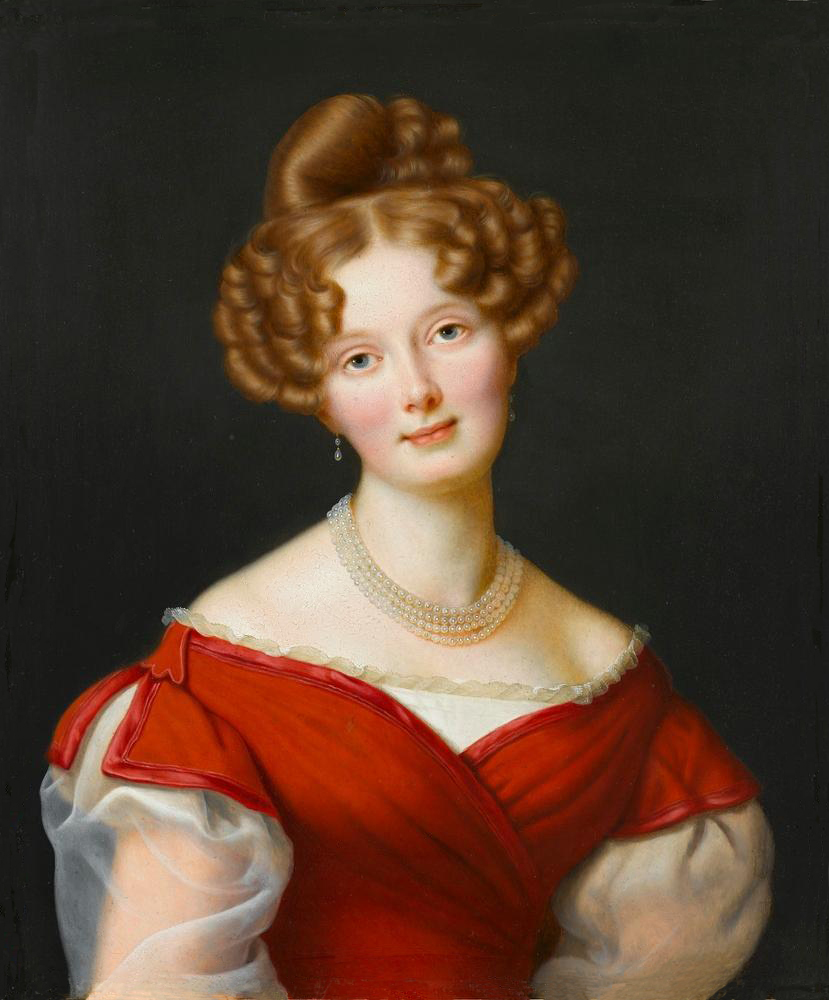
Portrait of Princess Pauline of Württemberg, 1830

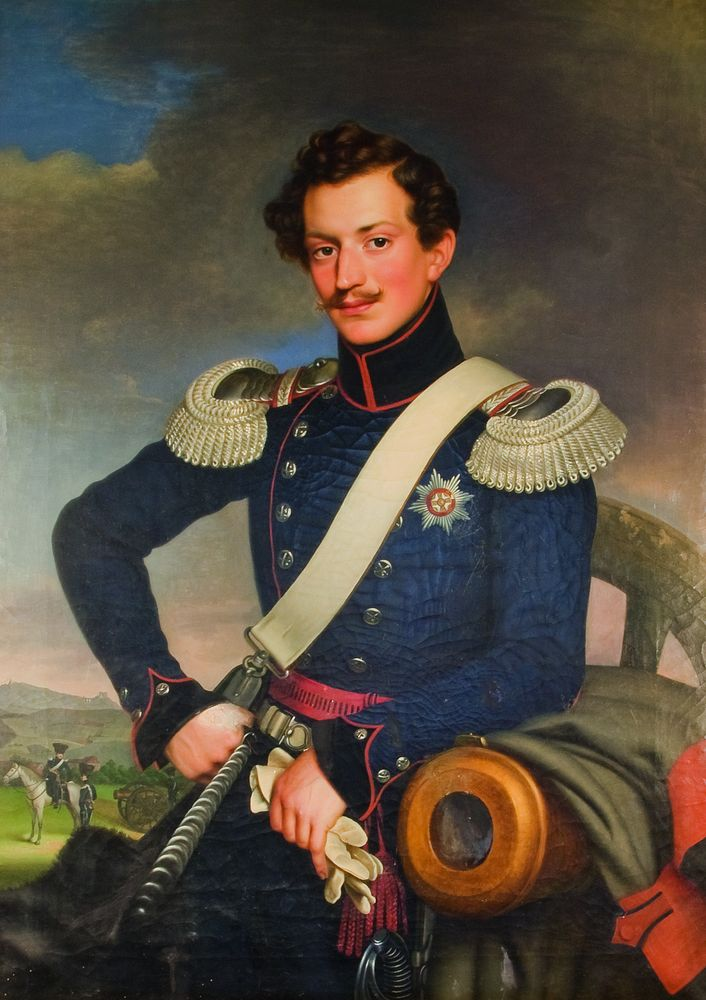
Portrait of Wilhelm, Duke of Urach, 1835

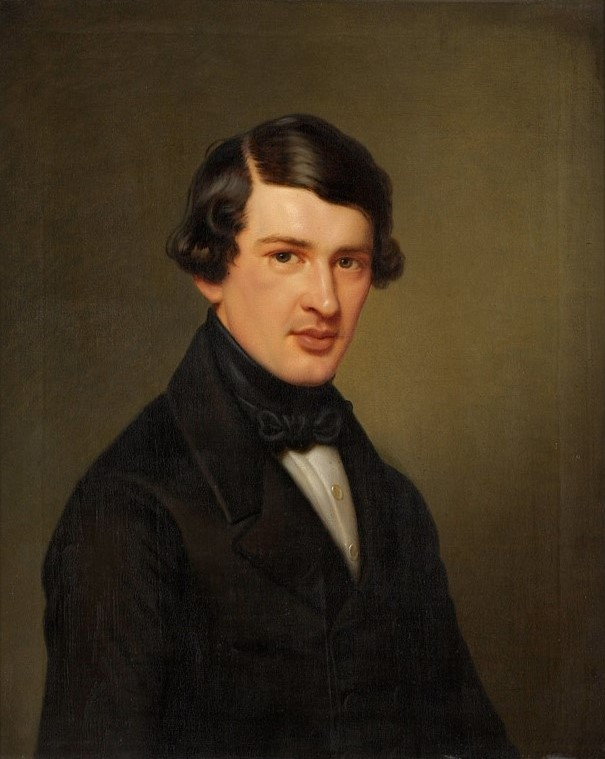
Portrait of Paul Julius Christlieb Haidlen, 1842

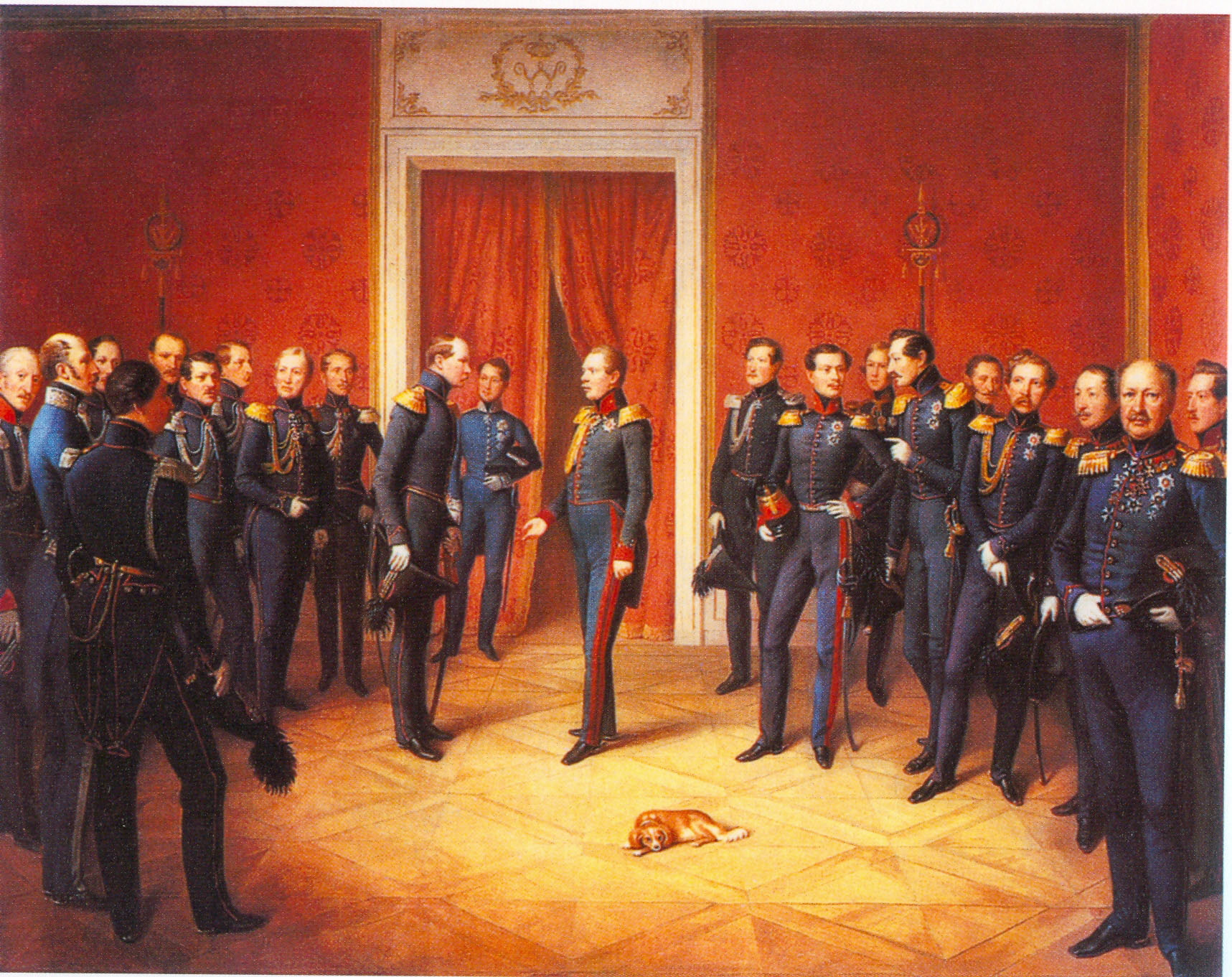
Portrait of Report to King William I, 1847
