= Schwalb =

Schwalb is a surname. Notable people with the surname include:

- Fernando Schwalb López Aldana (1916–2002), Prime Minister of Peru
- Martin Schwalb (born 1963), German handball player
- Robert J. Schwalb, American game designer
- Susan Schwalb (born 1944), American painter

== See also ==
- Schwab (surname)
