= Hauffe =

Hauffe is a German surname. Notable people with the surname include:

- Arthur Hauffe (1892–1944), German Wehrmacht general
- Friederike Hauffe (1801–1829), German mystic and somnambulist
- Gregor Hauffe (born 1982), German rower
