= Alexander of Württemberg (1801–1844) =

Alexander Christian Frederick Count of Württemberg
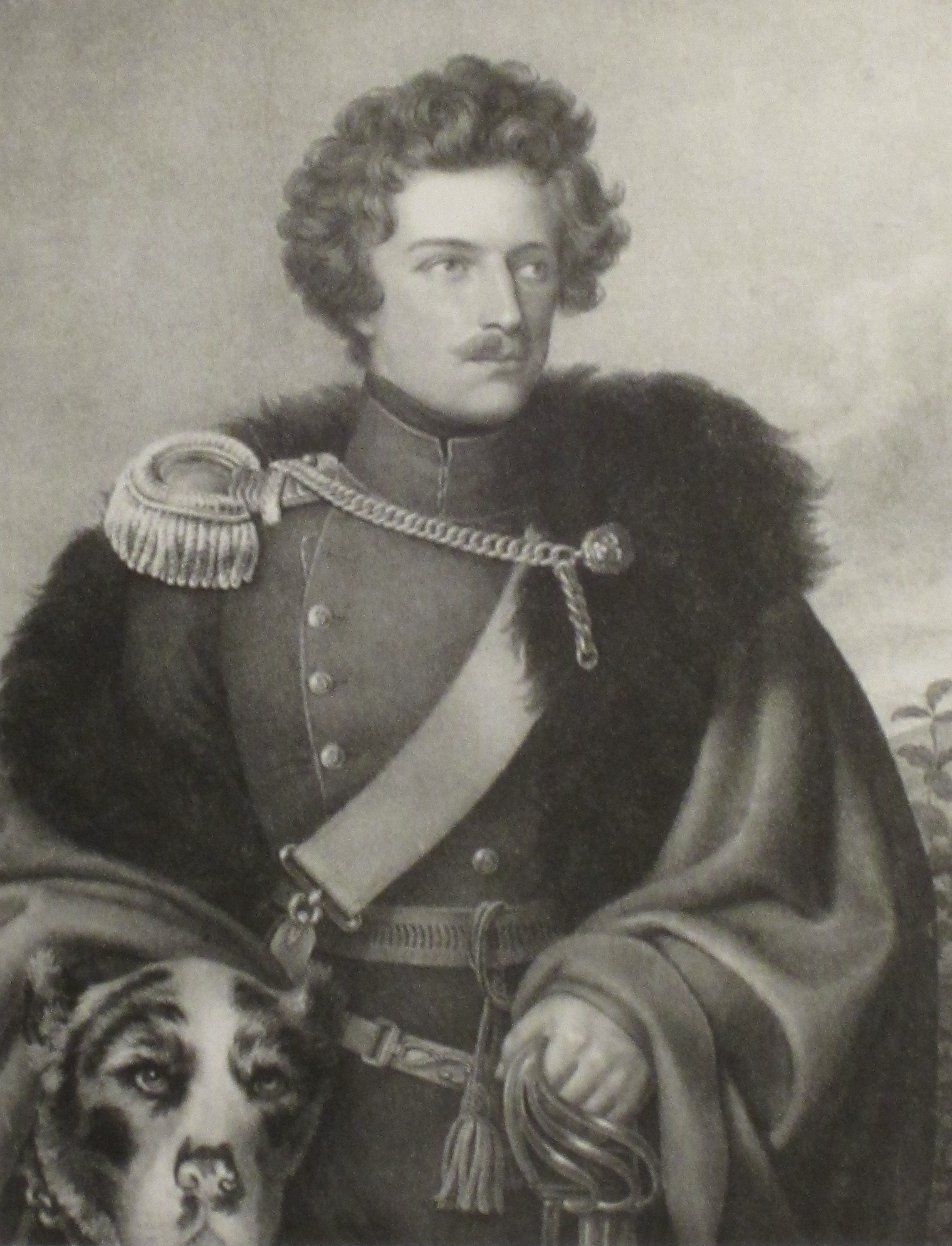
- Alexander von Württemberg
- Born: 5 November 1801; Copenhagen, Denmark
- Died: 7 July 1844 (aged 42); Wildbad, Württemberg
- Military career
- Allegiance: Kingdom of Württemberg
- Branch: Württembergian Army
- Rank: Lieutenant colonel
- Unit: 3rd Cavalry Regiment
- Other work: Poet

Alexander Christian Frederick, Count of Württemberg (5 November 1801, Copenhagen – 7 July 1844, Wildbad) was a German army officer and poet. He was the eldest surviving son of William Frederick Philip, Duke of Württemberg, who was a younger brother of Frederick I of Württemberg

== Biography ==
He received a military education in order to become a regular officer. Afterwards, he was commissioned as a lieutenant colonel in the 3rd Cavalry Regiment of Württemberg. The regiment was stationed in Esslingen am Neckar where Alexander von Württemberg stayed in the Obere Palmsche Palais.

For his summer residence, he lived in Schloss Serach. There he met with poets such as Emma Niendorf, Gustav Schwab, Justinus Kerner, Ludwig Uhland, and Hermann Kurz. These visits came to be known as the Serach Poet Circle.

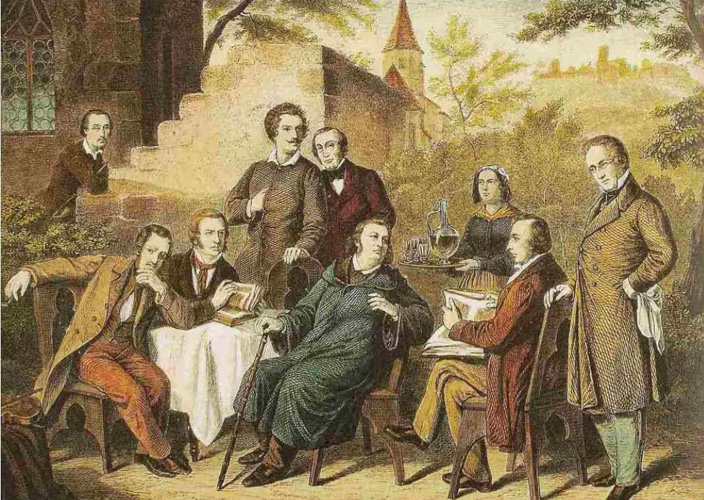
The Serach Poet Circle - Alexander is fourth from left

Alexander von Württemberg formed a particularly close friendship with Nikolaus Lenau, who shared his dejection and depression.

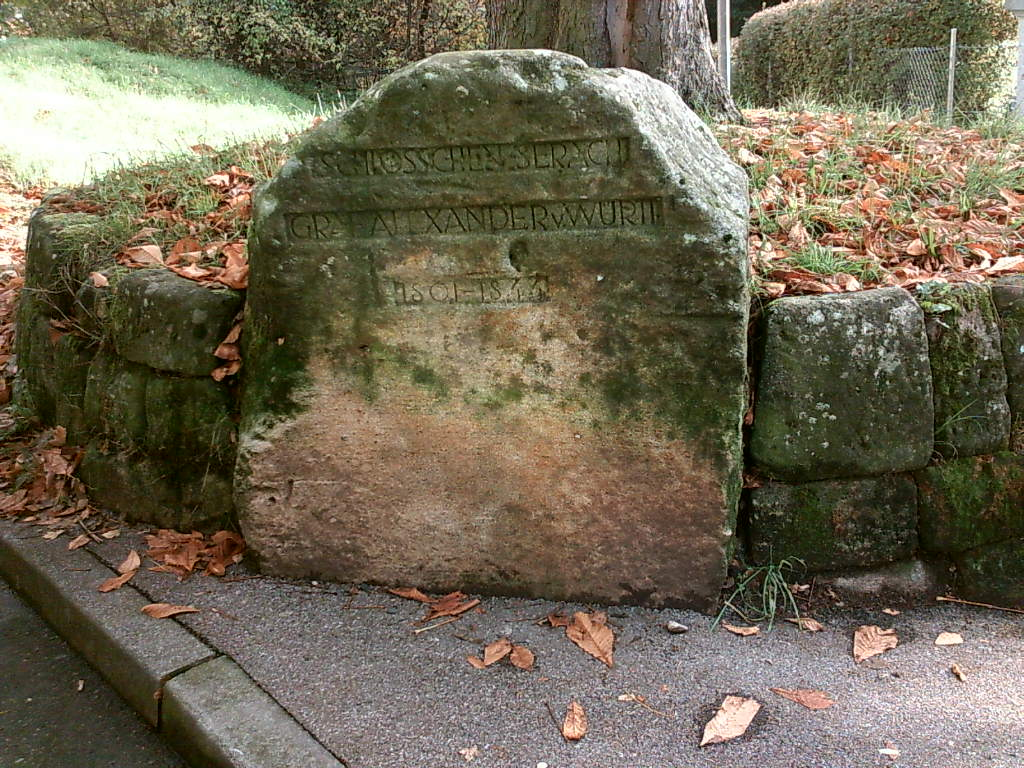
Alexander's memorial stone in Schloss Serach

He was married in 1832 to his Hungarian wife, Countess Helene Festetics von Tolna (1812–1886). Together they had two sons and two daughters.

He suffered from chronic headaches and moved to Italy in 1843 in a futile attempt to improve his health. He then moved to Wildbad, Württemberg where he died from a stroke in 1844. His body is interred in the Stiftskirche, Stuttgart.

== Ancestry ==
Ancestors of Alexander of Württemberg (1801–1844)

16. Frederick Charles, Duke of Württemberg-Winnental
8. Charles Alexander, Duke of Württemberg
17. Margravine Eleonore Juliane of Brandenburg-Ansbach
4. Frederick II Eugene, Duke of Württemberg
18. Anselm Franz, 2nd Prince of Thurn and Taxis
9. Princess Maria Augusta of Thurn and Taxis
19. Princess Maria Ludovika Anna Franziska of Lobkowicz
2. Duke William Frederick Philip of Württemberg
20. Philip William, Margrave of Brandenburg-Schwedt
10. Frederick William, Margrave of Brandenburg-Schwedt
21. Princess Johanna Charlotte of Anhalt-Dessau
5. Margravine Friederike of Brandenburg-Schwedt
22. Frederick William I of Prussia
11. Princess Sophia Dorothea of Prussia
23. Princess Sophia Dorothea of Hanover
1. Count Alexander of Württemberg
24. Gustav Johann de Rodes
12. Johan Christoph von Tunderfeldt-Rhodis
25. Lucia Sofia Tundermann
6. Baron Karl August Wilhelm von Tunderfeldt-Rhodis
26. Georg Fredrik Lew von Hohendorff
13. Emerentia Dorothea Lew von Hohendorff
27. Anna Henriette Barner
3. Baroness Wilhelmine von Tunderfeld-Rhodis
28. Ludwig Friedrich Schilling von Canstatt, Herr zu Thalheim
14. Baron Karl Friedrich Schilling von Canstatt
29. Eva Maria von Tegernau
7. Baroness Therese Wilhelmine Henriette Schilling von Canstatt
30. Baron Friedrich Ludwig von Bernerdin zum Pernthurn
15. Baroness Regina Luisa von Bernerdin zum Pernthurn
31. Baroness Maria Concordia von Grünthal
