= Schwab =

Schwab or Schwabe may refer to:

== People ==
- Schwab (surname)
- Schwabe, a surname

== Businesses ==
- Schwabe (publisher), the oldest printing and publishing house in the world
- Charles Schwab Corporation, an American stockbroker and electronic trading platform also known as Schwab
- Schwabe, Williamson & Wyatt, a law firm
- Schwab's Pharmacy, a famous drugstore in Hollywood

== Other uses ==
- Schwabe (crater), a small lunar crater
- Schwab, California, former name of Schwaub, California
- Camp Schwab, a US Marine Corps in Okinawa, Japan
- Schwab Cup, a contract bridge trophy competed for in 1933 and 1934 between the UK and the US - see Ely Culbertson

== See also ==
- Schwob, a surname
