= Melita Švob =

Croatian biologist

- Born: 17 July 1931 (age 95); Zagreb, Kingdom of Yugoslavia (now Croatia)
- Education: University of Zagreb

Melita Švob (German: Schwob; born 17 July 1931 in Zagreb, former Kingdom of Yugoslavia, now Croatia) is a Croatian Jewish biologist, scientist, and historian.

== Early life ==
Švob was born in Zagreb to a middle class Jewish family. As a child she survived the horror of the Holocaust and the NDH regime under a false identity. After the war, she attended a Gymnasium in Zagreb. Having completed her secondary education, she studied biology at the University of Zagreb from where she graduated successfully.

== Later life and career ==
In 1956 she moved from Zagreb to Ljubljana, where she worked at the oncological hospital.

After four years she moved with her husband, Tvrtko Švob, to Sarajevo, where she worked at the Faculty of Medicine as an assistant in the field of histology and embryology. In 1964 she finished her doctoral thesis. From 1964 until 1979 Švob worked at the Institute for Skin and Venereal Diseases where she establish histopathological laboratory. Švob worked on many scientific projects, and has published books and articles regarding Jews, World War II and other scientific issues. In 1977 she moved to Tuzla where she helped in establishment of Faculty of Medicine, and was elected as professor of histology and embryology.

Švob returned to Zagreb with her family in 1979. From 1979 to 1999 she worked as a higher scientific associate (and president of the scientific council) in the Institute for Migration and Nationalities in Zagreb. In the Jewish community of Zagreb in 2000 she founded the Research and Documentation Centre Cendo. As a scientist Švob studied the Jewish population in Croatia; as a result of that study she published the book "Židovska populacija u Hrvatskoj i Zagrebu".
