= Katharine Fisher Schwab =

American naval officer

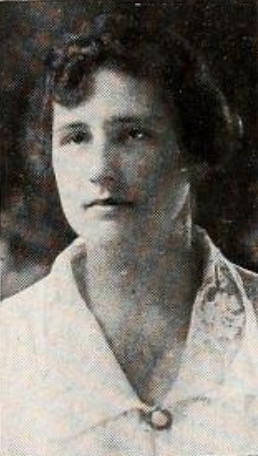
- Katharine Fisher Schwab, from the 1919 yearbook of Vassar College
- Born: September 23, 1898; New Haven, Connecticut, U.S.
- Died: November 19, 1990 (age 92); Danbury, Connecticut, U.S.
- Occupations: Navy officer, clubwoman
- Father: John Christopher Schwab
- Relatives: Gustav Schwab (great-grandfather)

Katharine Fisher Schwab (September 23, 1898 – November 19, 1990) was a U.S. Navy officer. She was "one of the first women to become an officer in the Navy at the outset of World War II".

== Early life and education ==
Schwab was born in New Haven, Connecticut, the daughter of John Christopher Schwab and Edith Aurelia Fisher Schwab. Her father was a librarian and historian based at Yale University, and her great-grandfather was German poet Gustav Schwab. Her maternal grandfather was Samuel Sparks Fisher, who was appointed U.S. Commissioner of Patents in 1869. She graduated from Vassar College in 1919. She served on the Vassar alumnae board of directors, and was elected chairman of the alumnae board in 1936.

== Career ==
Schwab had a sculpture studio in New York City as a young woman, and traveled, including three months in the American West in 1929, working on a ranch, hiking, and hunting. She enlisted in the WAVES in 1942. She was in the first class of officer candidates, and was commissioned as a lieutenant. She held the rank of lieutenant commander when she mustered out in 1945.

After the war, she was president of the Long Ridge Woman's Club and Library, and vice-president of the League of Women Voters of Connecticut. In 1959 she took a three-month cruise that visited Australia, New Zealand, Japan, Thailand, Bali, and Hong Kong. In 1964 she spent six weeks traveling in Europe. She was the only female member appointed to the Danbury Zoning Commission, serving on the commission from 1957 to 1961.

== Personal life ==
Schwab died in 1990, at the age of 92, in Danbury, Connecticut.
