= Šváb =

Šváb (feminine: Švábová) is a Czech and Slovak surname. Sváb is a Hungarian surname. Both are meaning 'Swabian' (inhabitant of Swabia) and are counterparts of the German surname Schwab. Notable people with the surname include:

- Antonín Šváb Jr. (born 1974), Czech speedway rider
- Antonín Šváb Sr. (1932–2014), Czech speedway rider
- Dániel Sváb (born 1990), Hungarian footballer
- Eugen Šváb (1936–2024), Slovak musician
- Filip Šváb (born 1983), Czech poet
- Josef Šváb (born 1933), Czech sports shooter
- Oldřich Šváb (1944–2020), Czech-Swiss football coach

== See also ==
- Josef Šváb-Malostranský (1860–1932), Czech actor, writer, film director and screenwriter
