= Ludwig Joseph Uhland =

German theologian (1722–1803)

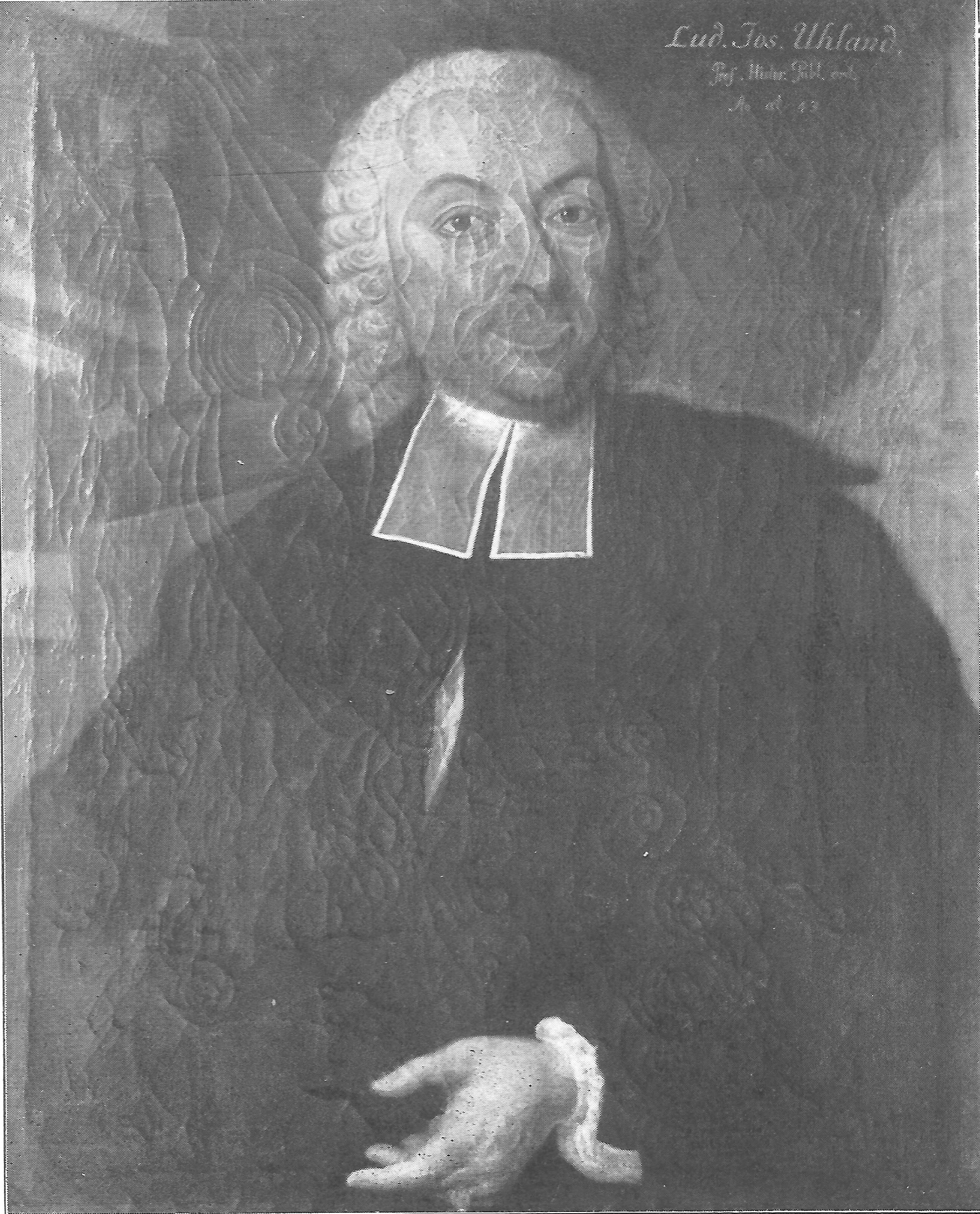
Portrait of Uhland in the collection of the University of Tübingen, c. 1800

Ludwig Joseph Uhland (1722–1803) was a German doctor and professor of theology.

== Life ==
Ludwig Joseph Uhland was born at Tübingen on 15 May 1722, where he also died on 15 December 1803. Additional information needed

== Works ==
- De Hist. Restaurati post Diluv. Orbis ab Exitu Noæ ex Arcausque ad Dispeisionen Gentiuns (Tübingen, 1761);
- De Ordine Vaticiniorum, quæ in Sedecim Prophet. Scripta Extant, Chrionologico (Tübingen, 1778);
- Annotationes ad Loca quædam Amosi, Imprim. Historica (Tübingen, 1779–80);
- Annotationes in Hoseæ Cap. iii (Tübingen, 1787);
- Cap. v, vi, 1–3 (Tübingen, 1789);
- Cap. vi, 4–11; vii, 1–6 (Tübingen, 1790);
- Cap. viii (Tübingen, 1791);
- Cap. ix (Tübingen, 1792);
- Dissertatio Exegetica in Hagg. ii, 1–9 (Tübingen, 1789).

== See also ==
- Ludwig Uhland

== Sources ==
- Schott, Theodor (1895). "Uhland, Ludwig Josef". In Allgemeine Deutsche Biographie (ADB). Vol. 39. Leipzig: Duncker & Humblot. pp. 146–148.

Attribution:

- Pick, B. (1881). "Uhland, Ludwig Joseph". In McClintock, John; Strong, James (eds.). Cyclopædia of Biblical, Theological and Ecclesiastical Literature. Vol. 10.—Su–Z. New York: Harper & Brothers. pp. 625–626.
