= Schwabe =

Schwabe is a German language habitational surname for someone from Swabia. Notable people with the name include:

- Carlos Schwabe (1866–1926), Swiss Symbolist painter and printmaker
- Frank Schwabe (1970), German politician
- George B. Schwabe (1886–1952), American politician
- Gustav Christian Schwabe (1813–1897), German-born merchant and financier
- Hartmut Schwabe (1943), German sprinter
- Heinrich Schwabe (1789–1875) German astronomer
- Joachim Schwabe (1983), German former footballer
- Johann Joachim Schwabe (1714–1784), German academic, poet and translator
- Julie Schwabe (1818–1896), German philanthropist and school founder
- Max Schwabe (1905–1983), U.S. Representative from Missouri
- Mike Schwabe (1964), American retired pitcher in Major League Baseball

== See also ==
- Schwab
- Schwob
