= Johann Christoph Schwab =

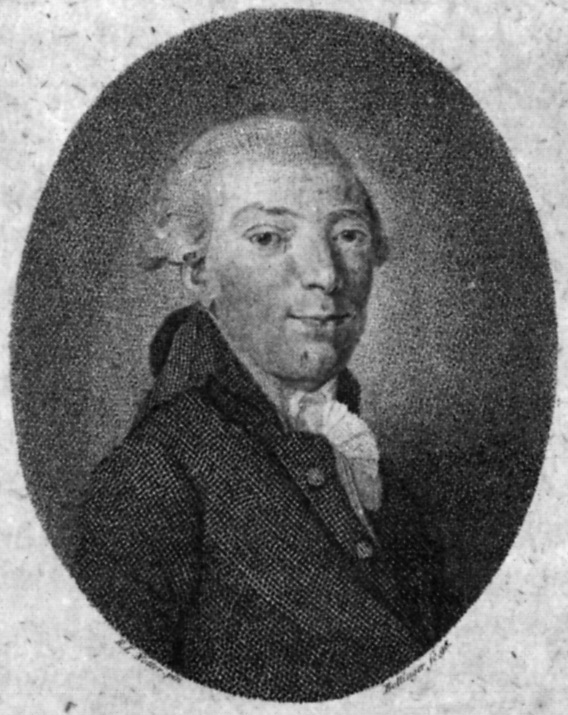

Johann Christoph Schwab (10 December 1743 - 15 April 1821) was a Württemberg philosopher.

== Biography ==
Johann Christoph Schwab was born in Ilsfeld, a small country town in the hills north of Stuttgart. His father was an accountant employed in the public service.Schwab attended the University of Tübingen where he studied Philosophy and Theology, obtaining his degree in 1764. After this he spent eleven years working in the French speaking region to the north of Lake Geneva, taking a succession of tutoring posts. By the end of these years he had acquired a deep knowledge of French literature and of the French language. In 1778 he was appointed to a professorship for Logic and Metaphysics at the Hohe Karlsschule (academy) in Stuttgart. Friedrich Schiller was a student there at the same time. Schwab married Johanna Philippina Friderika Rapp who came from a well established Stuttgart based merchant family. She was a niece of the sculptor Johann Heinrich von Dannecker. Children of the Schwab marriage included the Justice Minister and privy councillor Karl Heinrich von Schwab (1781-1847) and the writer-priest Gustav Schwab (1792-1850).

Schwab died at Stuttgart on 15 April 1821.

== Views and opinions ==
Schwab was not an admirer of the new Kantian critical philosophical approach emanating from Königsberg. His lectures tended to ignore Kant. In numerous books and essays he refuted the significance of the new approach as a reformulation of old thought patterns: he took every opportunity to characterise Kant's contribution as insignificant and shot through with inconsistency and contradiction.The spread of Kant's ideas had an increasingly polarising impact, and as he grew older Schwab moved from a position of nuanced conservatism, becoming progressively more "spirited" in his advocacy of the "traditional" philosophical structures identified by Leibniz and Wolff.

== Awards and recognition ==
Over the years Schwab received several prizes for his philosophical writings, including three from the Berlin based Prussian Academy of Sciences of which he became an external member in 1788 and an honorary member in 1812. Perhaps the most significant of those prizes was the first, awarded in 1784, won ex-aequo with Antoine de Rivarol, in an essay investigating why French had become a universal international language across Europe, how long this situation might continue, and whether the distinction was merited.

== Political career ==
Shortly after receiving this prize he was summoned to Berlin by Frederick the Great, a lover of French language and culture. He was offered a post at the Military Academy in Berlin, which at this time was the principal government supported education establishment in Prussia. In the event, however, Schwab received more persuasive offers of preferment at home. The Prince of Württemberg gave him a government appointment as privy secretary in Stuttgart.

When the duke died in 1793 and was succeeded by his brother, Duke Louis Eugene, who had known Schwab when they had been young men in the French speaking area north of Geneva, appointed him privy councillor. There were those who questioned whether he was fit to occupy a senior position in government. However, he continued to hold a succession of appointments during these turbulent years, and in 1816 the new king, William I, appointed him an Oberstudienrat (senior counsellor).

Alongside his government responsibilities, Schwab continued his work as a philosopher until 1813. His final work, "On the dark precepts" ("Von den dunkeln Vorstellungen") continued to apply and refine the Leibniz method even though he was well aware that by now this left him isolated from what had become the intellectual mainstream.

== Published works ==
- Zwölf Gedichte. Typographische Gesellschaft, Bern 1775. (digital copy)
- Dissertatio Logica De Methodo Analytica. Cotta, Stuttgart 1779. (digital copy)
- Von den Ursachen der Allgemeinheit der Französischen Sprache und wahrscheinlichen Dauer ihrer Herrschaft. Heerbarndt, Tübingen 1785. (digital copy)
- Einige Bemerkungen über die Apologie des Herrn Rektors Forberg zu Saalfeld wegen des ihm angeschuldigten Atheismus. Heerbrandt, Tübingen 1800. (digital copy)
- Prüfung der Kantischen Begriffe von der Undurchdringlichkeit der Körper. Schwickert, Leipzig 1807. (digital copy)
- Commentatio in primum elementorum Euclidis librum. Steinkkopf, Stuttgart 1814. (digital copy)
