= Schwob =

Schwob is a surname. Notable people with the surname include:

- Claude Schwob (1910–2000), American nuclear chemist
- Georges Schwob d'Héricourt (1864–1942), French businessman
- Lucy Schwob (Claude Cahun) (1894–1954), French photographer and writer
- Marcel Schwob (1867–1905), French writer
- Maurice Schwob (1859–1928), French newspaper publisher
- Patricio Schwob (born 1986), Chilean footballer
- William S. Schwob (1927–2017), American naval officer

== Variant surnames ==
- Goran Švob (1947–2013), Croatian philosopher, logician, and author
- Melita Švob (born 1931), Croatian biologist, scientist and historian

== See also ==
- Schwob Peak, McCuddin Mountains, Antarctica
- Villa Schwob (Villa Turque), a house by Le Corbusier in La Chaux-de-Fonds, Switzerland
- Schwab (disambiguation)
