= John Christopher Schwab =

American educator and librarian (1865–1916)

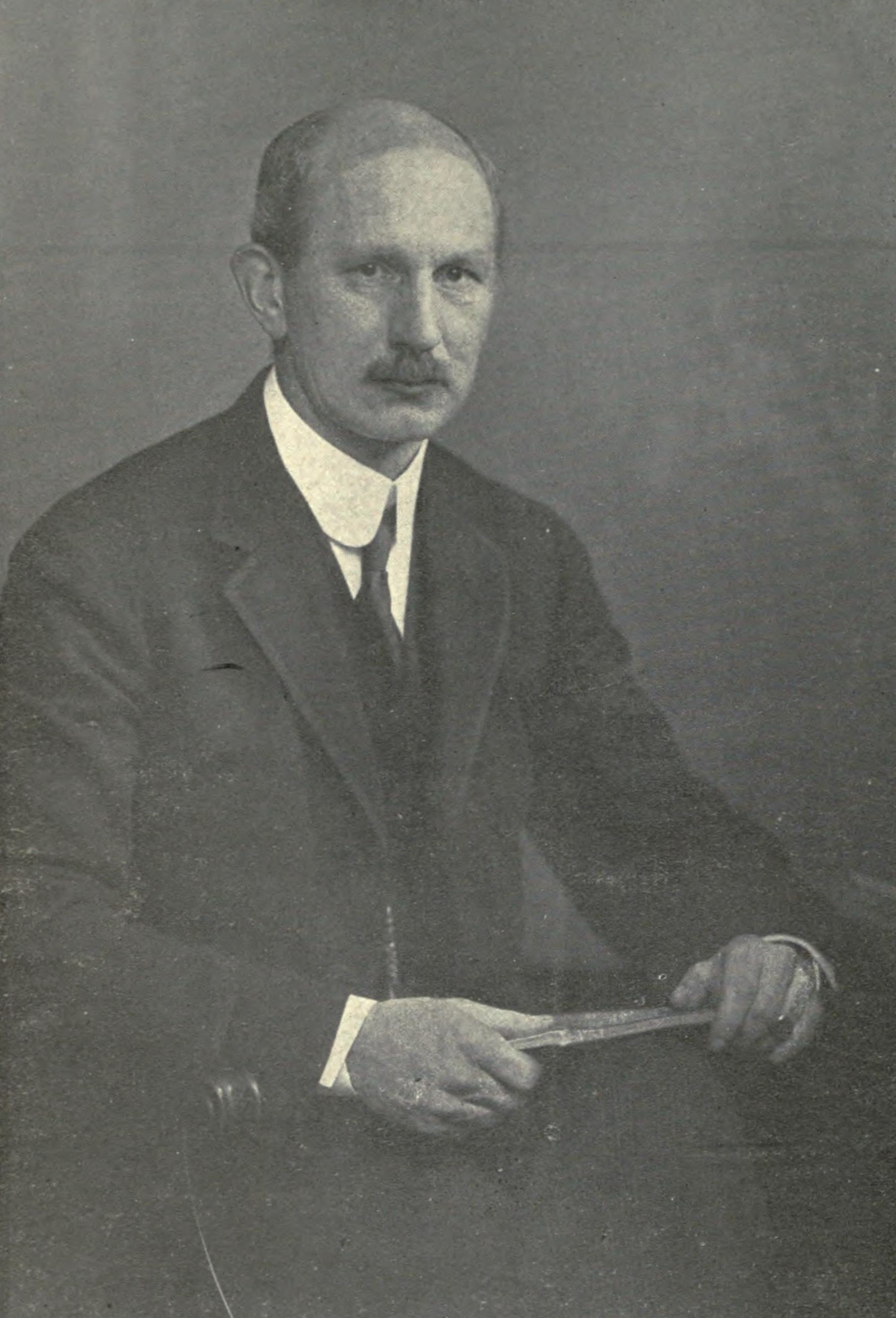
- Schwab in a 1916 publication
- Born: April 1, 1865; New York City, New York, U.S.
- Died: January 12, 1916 (aged 50); New Haven, Connecticut, U.S.
- Resting place: Grove Street Cemetery
- Education: Yale University (AB, AM); University of Berlin; University of Göttingen (PhD)
- Occupations: Educator; librarian; historian
- Years active: 1890–1916
- Notable work: The Finances of the Confederate States of America (1901)
- Spouse: Edith Aurelia Fisher (m. 1893)
- Children: 2, including Katharine
- Relatives: Gustav Schwab (grandfather); Henry Muhlenberg

John Christopher Schwab (April 1, 1865 – January 12, 1916) was an American educator and librarian from Connecticut. A historian of political economy, he was a professor at Yale University and served as the librarian of the Yale University Library from 1905 until his death.

== Early life ==
John Christopher Schwab was born on April 1, 1865, in New York City, to Catherine Elizabeth (née vonPost) and Gustav Schwab. His father was a member of the firm Oelrichs & Company. He was named for his great-grandfather, a privy counselor of Stuttgart, Germany. His paternal grandfather was poet Gustav Schwab. Through his mother, he was related to Lutheran Church founder Henry Muhlenberg. He studied under private tutors and at Gibbons' and Beach's School in New York City. At Yale University, he received prizes for English and Latin composition, high oration appointments, and was a member of Phi Beta Kappa. He was also a member of Skulls and Bones. He sang in the Class Glee Club when he was a sophomore and then was a member of the Second Glee Club. He was an editor of the Yale Courant in his senior year. He graduated from Yale with a Bachelor of Arts in 1886. He was a post-graduate at Yale in political economy for one year. During this period, he taught German at the Hopkins Grammar School.

In July 1887, Schwab traveled to Europe for the summer. He then entered the University of Berlin. He completed his studies and graduated with a Doctor of Philosophy from the University of Göttingen in 1889. He also completed a Master of Arts degree from Yale in 1888. He then moved back to the United States.

== Career ==
Schwab conducted historical research at the libraries of New York City. In the fall of 1890, he became a lecturer of political economy at Yale. He became an instructor in 1891. He was promoted to assistant professor in 1893 and became a full professor in 1898. In 1905, he became librarian of the Yale University Library and served in this role until his death. He also served in the University Council and was a member of the council's committee on publications with his association with the Yale University Press. In 1901, Schwab served as the chairman of the Yale Bicentennial committee. He contributed to historical journals and magazines, including serving as an editor of The Yale Review since 1892. He published The History of New York Property Tax in 1880 and The Finances of the Confederate States of America in 1901. Prior to his death, he was announced as the secretary of the pageant committee for the 200th anniversary of Yale.

Schwab was secretary of the Yale class of 1886 in 1905 and served in that office until his death. He was secretary and treasurer of Lowell House. He was president of the Model Housing Association of New Haven. He served on the board of trustees of the New Haven Public Library. He served as a member of Company F of the Second Regiment of the Connecticut National Guard. He was a trustee of Mount Holyoke College and in 1913, he was on the committee of Mount Holyoke's 75th anniversary pageant. He was also a member of the American Economic Association, the British Economic Association, the Connecticut Academy of Arts and Sciences, the American Library Association, the Century Club of New York, and the Massachusetts Historical Society.

== Personal life ==
Schwab married Edith Aurelia Fisher, daughter of Aurelia Safford (née Crosette) and Samuel Sparks Fisher, of Cincinnati, Ohio, on October 5, 1893. They had two children, Katharine Fisher and Norman vonPost. His sister married Henry Charles White. He was a member of St. Paul's Protestant Episcopal Church and served as its Sunday school superintendent.

Schwab died of pneumonia on January 12, 1916, at his home on Prospect Street in New Haven, Connecticut. He was buried in Grove Street Cemetery in New Haven.

== Awards ==
In 1911, Schwab received an honorary Doctor of Letters degree from Muhlenberg College.
