= Justinus Kerner =

German poet and medical writer (1786–1862)

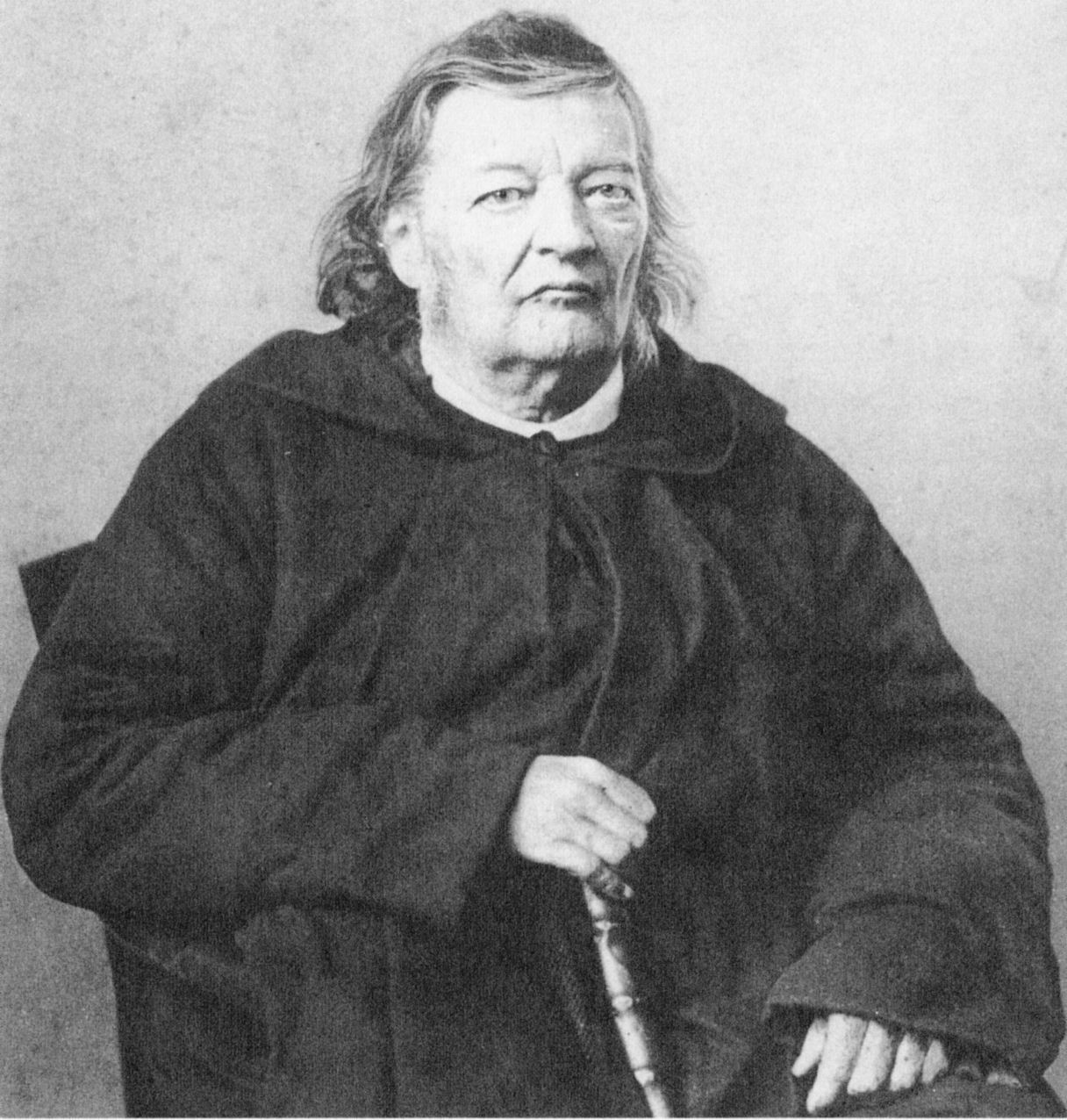
Justinus Kerner in old age, c. 1860

Justinus Andreas Christian Kerner (18 September 1786, in Ludwigsburg, Baden-Württemberg, Germany – 21 February 1862, in Weinsberg, Baden-Württemberg) was a German poet, practicing physician, and medical writer. He gave the first detailed description of botulism.

== Life ==
He was born at Ludwigsburg in Württemberg. After attending the classical schools of Ludwigsburg and Maulbronn, he was apprenticed in a cloth factory, but, in 1804, owing to the good services of Professor Karl Philipp Conz, was able to enter the University of Tübingen. He studied medicine but also had time for literary pursuits in the company of Ludwig Uhland, Gustav Schwab and others. He took his doctor's degree in 1808, spent some time travelling, and then settled as a practising physician in Wildbad.

Here he completed his Reiseschatten von dem Schattenspieler Luchs (1811), in which his own experiences are described with caustic humour. He next collaborated with Uhland and Schwab in the Poetischer Almanach for 1812, which was followed by the Deutscher Dichterwald (1813), and in these some of Kerner's best poems were published. In 1815 he obtained the official appointment of district medical officer (Oberamtsarzt) in Gaildorf, and in 1818 was transferred to Weinsberg, where he spent the rest of his life.

His house, the site of which at the foot of the historical Schloss Weibertreu was presented to him by the townspeople, became a mecca for literary pilgrims, all of whom were made welcome. Gustav IV Adolf of Sweden came with a knapsack on his back. The poets Christian Friedrich Alexander von Württemberg and Nikolaus Lenau were constant guests, and in 1826 Friederike Hauffe (1801–1829), the daughter of a forester in Prevorst, a somnambulist and clairvoyante, arrived; she forms the subject of Kerner's famous work Die Seherin von Prevorst, Eröffnungen über das innere Leben des Menschen und über das Hineinragen einer Geisterwelt in die unsere (The Seeress of Prevorst, revelations of the human inner life and about the penetrations of the spirit world into ours, 1829; 6th ed., 1892). In 1826 he published a collection of Gedichte which were later supplemented by Der letzte Blütenstrauß (1852) and Winterblüten (1859). Among others of his well-known poems are the charming ballad Der reichste Fürst; a drinking song, Wohlauf, noch getrunken, and the pensive Wanderer in der Sägemühle.

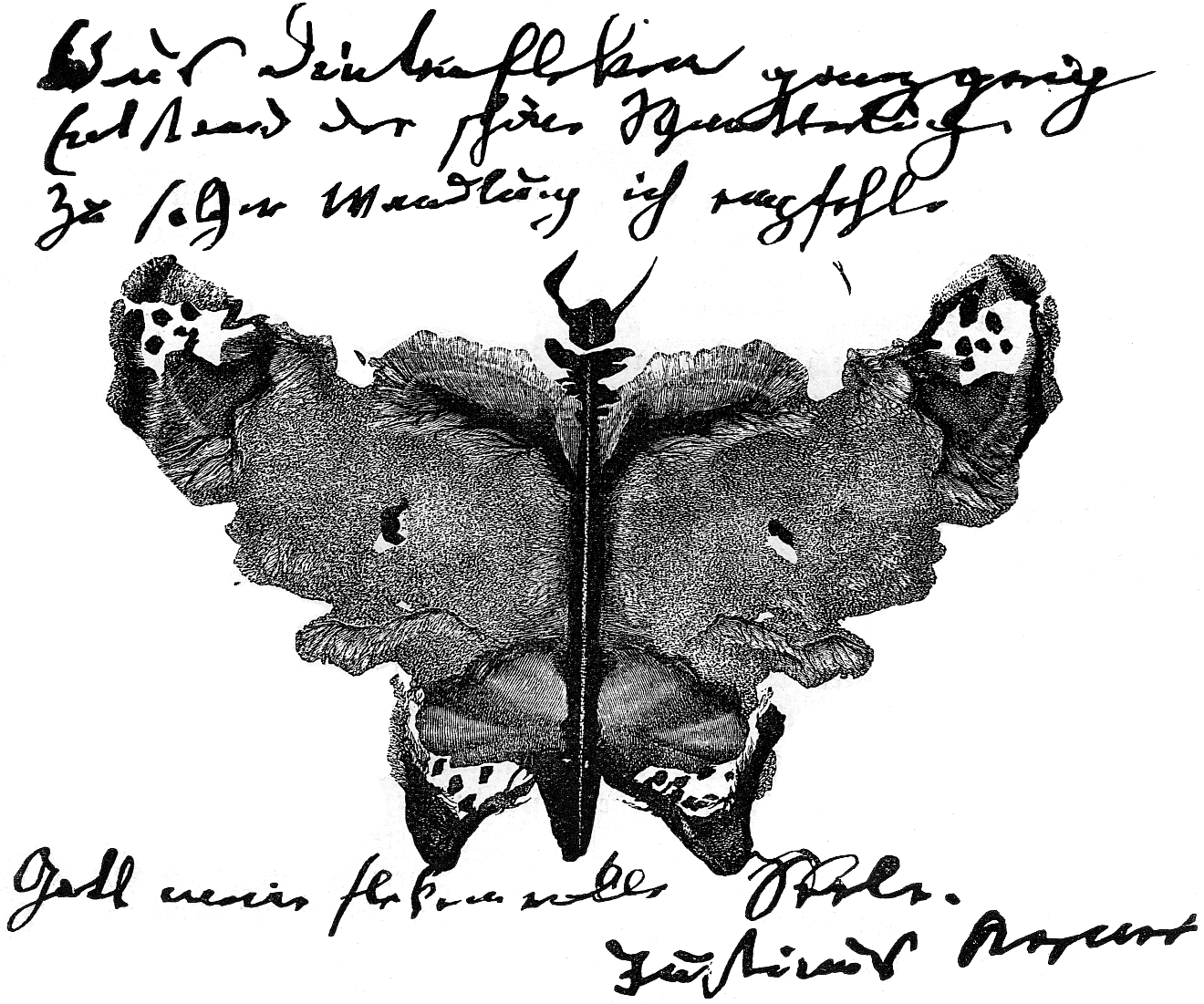
Autograph with klecksography

In addition to his literary productions, Kerner wrote some popular medical books, dealing with animal magnetism, the first treatise on sebacic acid and botulism, Das Fettgift oder die Fettsäure und ihre Wirkung auf den tierischen Organismus (1822), and a description of Wildbad and its healing waters, Das Wildbad im Königreich Württemberg (1813). He also gave a vivid account of his youthful years in Bilderbuch aus meiner Knabenzeit (1859) and, in Die Bestürmung der württembergischen Stadt Weinsberg im Jahre 1525 (1820), showed considerable skill in historical narrative.

In 1851 he was compelled, owing to increasing blindness, to retire from his medical practice, but he lived, carefully tended by his daughters, at Weinsberg until his death. He was buried beside his wife, who had died in 1854, in the graveyard of Weinsberg, and the grave is marked by a stone slab with an inscription he himself had chosen: Friederike Kerner und ihr Justinus.

== Association with George Rapp and the Harmony Society ==
In Bilderbuch aus meiner Knabenzeit, Kerner recalls George Rapp's visits to his father, the Oberamtmann at Maulbronn. Kerner's father had helped shield Rapp from religious persecution by the authorities in Germany, and Kerner well remembered Rapp and his long black beard. George Rapp and his followers eventually left Germany in 1803, settled in the United States, and started the Harmony Society. Die Seherin von Prevorst and its tale about Kerner's relationship with Friederike Hauffe — the latter reputed to have visionary and healing powers, and who had produced a strange 'inner' language containing Hebrew-like elements — made quite an impression among the members of the Harmony Society in 1829, who saw it as confirmation of the approaching millennium and of their religious views.

== Evaluations ==
- "Kerner was one of the most inspired poets of the Swabian school. His poems, which largely deal with natural phenomena, are characterized by a deep melancholy and a leaning towards the supernatural, which, however, is balanced by a quaint humour, reminiscent of the Volkslied." — 1911 Encyclopædia Britannica
- "The poems and dramatic scenes of his Reiseschatten are characterized by a dreamy fancy and a peculiar fantastic humor." — New International Encyclopedia
- "He was at times morbid, fanciful, dreamy, sensitive and poetic and endowed with a strange, fantastic humor . . ." — 1920 Encyclopedia Americana

== The Saw ==
The Saw was translated by William Cullen Bryant and was included in Graham's Magazine in 1848.

In yonder mill I rested,
And sat me down to look
Upon the wheel's quick glimmer.
And on the flowing brook.

As in a dream, before me,
The saw, with restless play,
Was cleaving through a fir-tree
Its long and steady way.

The tree through all its fibres
With living motion stirred,
And, in a dirge-like murmur,
These solemn words I heard—

Oh, thou, who wanderest hither,
A timely guest thou art!
For thee this cruel engine
Is passing through my heart.

When soon, in earth's still bosom,
Thy hours of rest begin,
This wood shall form the chamber
Whose walls shall close thee in.

Four planks—I saw and shuddered—
Dropped in that busy mill;
Then, as I tried to answer,
At once the wheel was still.

== Cultural references ==
- Robert Schumann set Kerner's poems in his Opus 35, 12 Gedichte von Justinus Kerner, composed in 1840 and dedicated to “Dr. Friedrich Weber in London.” Schumann called the set a Liederreihe, or "row of songs."
- The poet Thomas Medwin stayed with him during 1848 to 1849 and later wrote a poem in his honour, To Justinus Kerner: With a Painted Wreath of Bay-Leaves, published in London in 1854.
- Composer Pauline Volkstein (1849-1925) used Kerner’s text for at least one of her lieder.
- The grape variety Kerner, bred in 1929, was named in his honour.
- Søren Kierkegaard wrote in his journal on Kerner:
  - “I cannot help being amazed that Justinus Kerner (in his Dichtungen) is able to interpret so conciliatingly the phenomenon which has always shocked me since my very first experience of it — that someone says just exactly what I say. To me the phenomenon seemed to be the most confusing, almost Punch-and-Judy, disorder: the one would begin a sentence which the other would finish, and no one could be sure who was speaking.” July 11, 1837Journals 2539
  - “Justinus Kerner has interested me so much just now because, although he is far more gifted, I see in him the same artistic barrenness I see in myself. But I also see how something can be done even though essential continuity is lacking and can be fulfilled only by continuity of mood, of which every single little idea is a blossom, a kind of novelistic aphorism, a plastic study. While his own Dichtungen are full of excellent imaginative ideas, his reports aus dem Nachtgebiete der Natur are so dry that we could almost take that to be indirect proof of their truth.” July 13, 1837Journals 5240
