= Claude Schwob =

American nuclear chemist

- Born: 1910
- Died: 2000 (aged 89–90)
- Known for: Manhattan Project
- Scientific career
- Fields: Nuclear chemistry

Claude Schwob (1910–2000) was an American nuclear chemist who worked on the Manhattan Project. After the end of World War II, he was employed at the Naval Radiological Defense Laboratory. Schwob, who was gay, was open about his sexuality throughout his life.

== Biography ==
Schwob was born on June 16, 1910, in New York, and lived in France for much of his childhood. He graduated in 1931 from Fordham University with a PhD in chemistry, and went on to teach there at St. Peter's College. During World War II, Schwob volunteered to serve in the Chemical Warfare Service. He worked on the Manhattan Project, first at the University of Chicago, then in Los Alamos, New Mexico. He is the only gay man known to have served as a researcher on the Manhattan Project at a high clearance level, and was open about his sexuality.

After the end of the Manhattan Project, Schwob returned to teaching at the Institute of Technology in Chicago until 1947. A 1946 entry in the journal of Glenn T. Seaborg mentions Schwob, who had written Seaborg to ask about hot lab images for an upcoming presentation to the Instrument Society of America. Beginning in 1948, Schwob researched radiation in a top-secret lab at the Naval Radiological Defense Laboratory, where he remained until his retirement. His work on radiation exposure made him a leading national expert on the topic. Rod Buntzen, one of his colleagues there, describes Schwob as speaking openly about his sexuality and sexual activities.

An avid amateur photographer, Schwob took a large number of photos of men through the 1940s and 1950s. His subjects are often nude and sometimes engaging in oral sex; Schwob himself sometimes appears, engaging familiarly with the other men or joining in the sexual activities. Schwob also collected prints from the Athletic Model Guild, similarly depicting men in states of undress. His large photographic collection is now in the archive of the GLBT Historical Society.

Schwob lived in the Castro, a gay neighborhood in San Francisco. He spent time at San Gregorio State Beach and the Russian River, as well as the Oasis, a local gay bathhouse. He supported Hospitality House and programs assisting homeless gay youth. Although he lived alone, Schwob had a number of regular male partners, mostly younger than him. Photos from his collection document a 1955 road trip through the Pacific Northwest with one of these companions. He continued to be sexually active well into old age. Schwob died on July 24, 2000.
