= Friederike Hauffe =

19th century German mystic

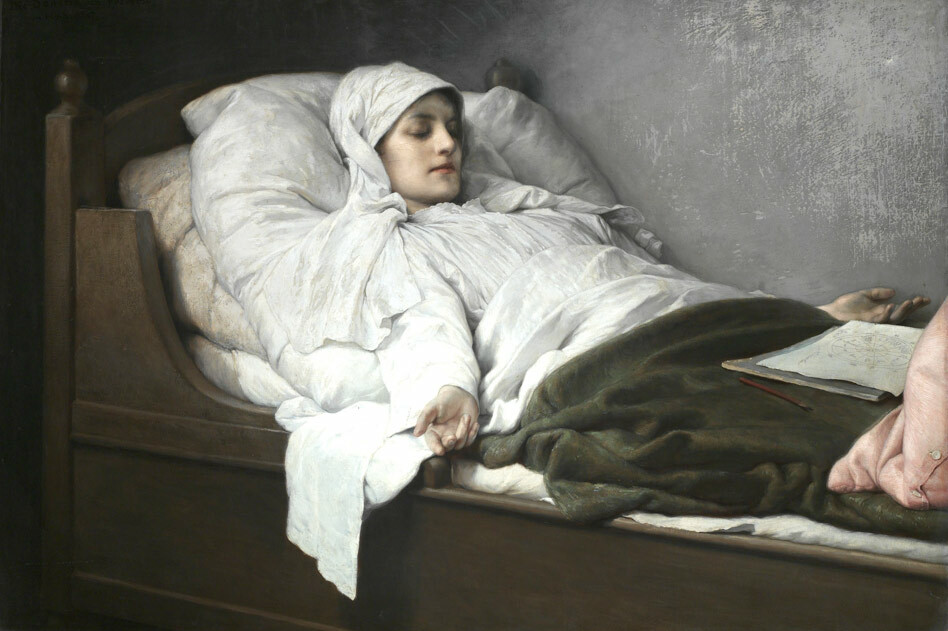
The Seeress of Prevorst in High Sleep, an 1892 oil painting by Gabriel von Max

Friederike Hauffe (born Friederike Wanner, 23 September 1801 – 25 August 1829), also known as Frederica Hauffe, or the Seeress of Prevorst, was a German mystic and somnambulist.

== Life ==
Hauffe was born in Prevorst, a small village "In Wirtemberg, near the town of Löwenstein, on those mountains whose highest point, the Stocksberg, is raised 1879 feet above the level of the sea, surrounded on all sides by hill and valley, and in a romantic seclusion...`with] something more than 400 inhabitants, the greatest number of whom maintain themselves by woodcutting, coalburning, and collecting the productions of the forest". Her father was a gamekeeper or district forester. She grew up physically healthy, as opposed to her sisters who were afflicted in their childhood with "gout", according to the physician Justinus Kerner in his book about her.

At a very early age, it was alleged she had "premonitory dreams" and could point out "metals and water with the hazel wand". She was later (it is unclear at what age) given into the care of her grandmother and grandfather Johann Schmidgall in Löwenstein. He recognized what was described as "sensibility to spiritual influences". Later, her parents took her back to the secluded village of Prevorst, until the family moved to Oberstenfeld. She lived there from age 17 until 19. At age 19 her parents arranged that she became engaged to a Gottlieb Hauffe, who belonged to her uncle's family. In 1821 on the same day as her wedding, the funeral of the minister of Oberstenfeld took place, a more than 60-year-old man who had had great spiritual influence on her.

After her marriage, she lived at Kürnbach. She died in Löwenstein.

== Investigations ==
Hauffe had suffered from convulsions, and fell into spontaneous trances. She claimed to have communicated with spirits and experienced visions. Hauffe was made famous by the physician Justinus Kerner who examined her at Weinsberg in 1826. He described her trances in his book Die Seherin von Prevorst (1829). She spent much of her time in a state of somnambulism. Kerner recorded alleged instances of clairvoyance and prophetic dreams. However, psychical researcher Frank Podmore noted that the "evidence is in all cases inconclusive, and sometimes indicative of collusion with members of the Seeress's family."

Psychical researcher Addington Bruce who researched the case suggested that Kerner was a biased witness and easily duped by the paranormal claims of Hauffe. He noted that Kerner's record of "facts" consisted of anecdotes given by Hauffe and her friends, thus unreliable. He also wrote that Hauffe "unquestionably cooperated" with her sister and servant girl in producing fraudulent phenomena to deceive Kerner.

Between November 17, 1933 and December 15, 1933, Carl Jung gave 5 lectures at the Swiss Federal Institute of Technology (ETH) on Mrs. Hauffe's case, taken from a psychiatric and psychological perspective. He noted that "Her case illustrates the utmost introversion, in that everything moves inward. Everything in her has been cut off from our reality; indeed she defended herself against the outer world." Jung also mentioned Kerner's observation of malnutrition, including scurvy, which was common in the early 19th Century in rural Germany.
