= Matthias Schwab (pharmacologist) =

German pharmacologist

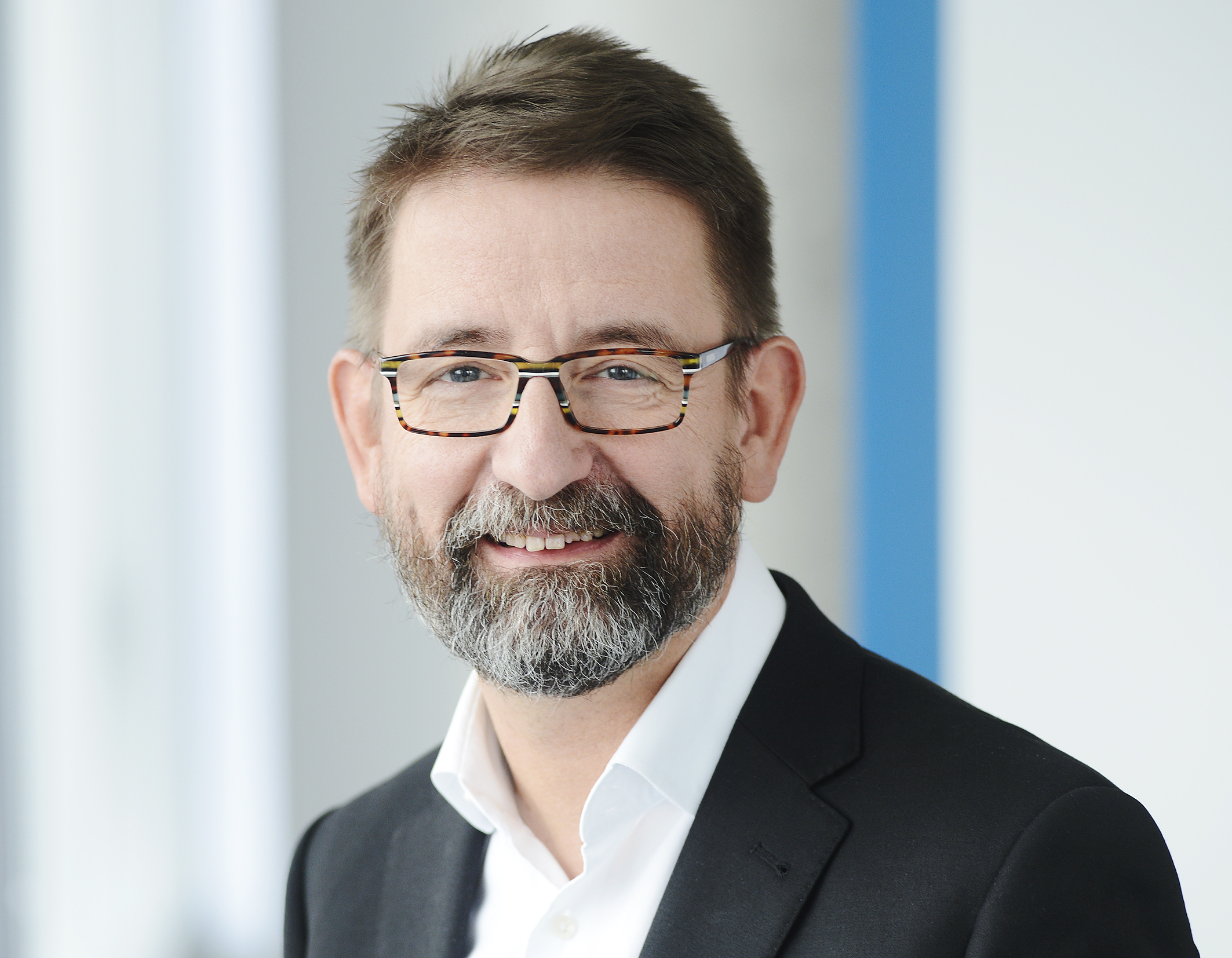
- Born: September 3, 1963 (age 63); Nuremberg, Germany
- Education: University of Erlangen–Nuremberg; Eberhard Karls University of Tübingen
- Occupation: Pharmacologist
- Employer: University of Tübingen

Matthias Schwab (born September 3, 1963 in Nuremberg) is a German doctor and university lecturer. He is director of the Dr. Margarete Fischer-Bosch-Institute of Clinical Pharmacology located on the campus of the Robert-Bosch-Hospital in Stuttgart, an institution of the Robert Bosch Stiftung, and holder of the Chair of Clinical Pharmacology at the University of Tübingen as well as Medical Director of the Department of Clinical Pharmacology at the University Hospital Tübingen.

== Life ==
After graduating from the Dürer Gymnasium in Nuremberg, Schwab studied Medicine and obtained his doctorate in 1991 at the Institute for Toxicology and Pharmacology at the Friedrich-Alexander University of Erlangen–Nuremberg. After gaining his license to practice medicine, he obtained board qualifications for pediatric and adolescent medicine in 1996 and in clinical pharmacology in 2000.

He completed his habilitation in 2003 at the Eberhard Karls University of Tübingen. After a visiting professorship at the St. Jude Children’s Research Hospital in Memphis (Tennessee, USA) he took over the management of the Dr. Margarete Fischer-Bosch Institute of Clinical Pharmacology and the Chair of Clinical Pharmacology at the University of Tübingen, where he has also been a co-opted professor of the faculty of mathematical and natural science since 2015.

His main research interests focus on pharmacological Genome Research and its importance for Personalized Medicine. He is particularly interested in the application of new technologies in the context of pharmacogenomics including epigenetic aspects in connection with cancer therapies and immunosuppressants

Appointments as full professor for clinical pharmacology at the Medical University of Innsbruck, Austria (2006), as well as professor and chair of clinical pharmacology with simultaneous position as senior physician in the clinic at Karolinska University and Karolinska University Hospital, Sweden (2010), he declined. Since 2018 he is Adjunct Professor of the Departments of Clinical Pharmacology and Biochemistry at Yerevan State Medical University, Armenia.

== Scholarships, awards and administrative functions ==
- 2026: Global Research Partnerships initiative ranking 2026: University of Tübingen ranks 2^{nd} in the subject area “Pharmacology, Toxicology, and Pharmacy” being represented academically by M. Schwab
- 2025: Member of the Specialized Ethics Committee for Special Procedures at the German Federal Institute of Drugs and Medicinal Products (BfArM) (2025-2030)
- 2024: Honorary Member of the Finnish Society of Clinical Pharmacology
- 2022: Member of the Academia Europaea
- 2022–2025: Member of the Advisory Board of the German Federal Institute for Drugs and Medical Devices (BfArM)
- 2021: Fellow of the British Pharmacological Society (BPS)
- Since 2017 Member of the Ethics Committee of the University Hospital Tuebingen
- 2015/’16/’18/ 2020 - 2026: Thomson Reuters/Clarivate Analytics Highly Cited Researchers, rubric “Pharmacology & Toxicology”, and “Cross Field”
- 2016: Robert Pfleger-Research Award
- 2015 and 2018: President of the German Society of Experimental and Clinical Pharmacology and Toxicology (DGPT)
- 2015: Conferment of the Staufer medal in gold by the minister-president of Baden-Württemberg
- Since 2015: Chairman of the Medical Research Commission of the Academy of Sciences and Literature, Mainz
- 2014: Full member of the German National Academy of Sciences Leopoldina
- 2013 – 2018: Chair of the German Society of Clinical Pharmacology (DGKliPha)
- 2012: Full member of the Academy of Sciences and Literature, Mainz
- Since 2008: International Union of Basic and Clinical Pharmacology (IUPHAR): Sub-Committee Pharmacogenetics (2008-2022), Sub-Committee Drug Metabolism and Transporter (2010-2014 Executive Board, 2014-2018 Vice Chair, 2019-2022 Chair); Sub-Committee Pharmacogenetics, Drug Metabolism and Transport (2022–present, Member)
- 2010–2017: Member of the governing body of the European Association for Clinical Pharmacology and Therapeutics (EACPT)
- 2007-2024: Member of the Drugs Commission of the German Medical Association (AKdÄ)
- 2005: Galenus von Pergamon Award
- 2004: Friedrich Hartmut Dost Award
- Since 2004: full member and deputy chairman of the Commission for Drugs for Children and Young People at the Federal Institute for Drugs and Medical Devices (BfArM), Germany
- Since 2004: Member of the ethics committee of the Medical Association of Baden-Württemberg

== Publications (as Editor) ==
=== Journals ===
- Since 2007: Editor-in-Chief of Pharmacogenetics & Genomics (with J. Yang, USA)
- Since 2018: Co-Editor in Chief of Drug Research
- 2008-2024: Section Editor Pharmacogenomics & Personalized Medicine of Genome Medicine, since 2024 Member of the Editorial Board

=== Monographs ===
- Pharmacogenomics in psychiatry. M. Schwab, Wolfgang P. Kaschka, E. Spina. Basel [Switzerland]: Karger. 2010. ISBN 978-3-8055-9499-8. OCLC 655257652.
- Pediatric clinical pharmacology. Hannsjörg W. Seyberth, Anders Rane, Matthias Schwab. Berlin. 2011. ISBN 978-3-642-20194-3. OCLC 724984111.
- Pediatric pharmacotherapy. W. Kiess, M. Schwab, Johannes van den Anker. Cham, Switzerland: Springer. 2020. ISBN 978-3-030-50494-6. OCLC 1176512445.
- Precision Medicine. I. Cascorbi, M. Schwab. Cham, Switzerland: Springer. 2023. ISBN 978-3-031-40046-9. OCLC 1396133889.
