= Ludwig Uhland =

German poet and politician (1787–1862)

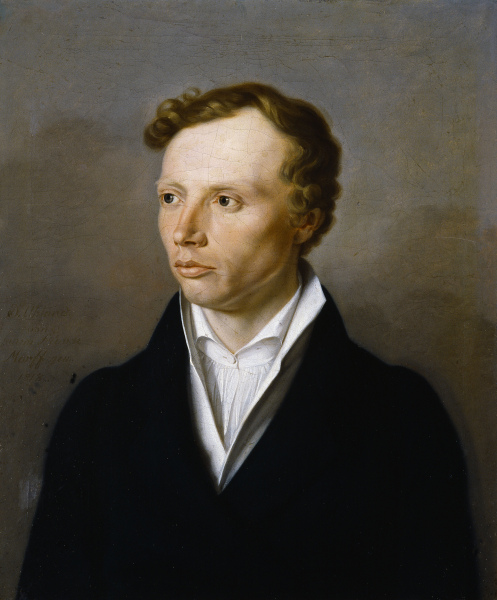
- Portrait by Gottlob Wilhelm Morff, c. 1818
- Born: Johann Ludwig Uhland; April 26, 1787; Tübingen, Duchy of Württemberg
- Died: November 13, 1862 (aged 75); Tübingen, Kingdom of Württemberg
- Occupation: Philologist
- Political party: Old Liberals
- Movement: Romanticism
- Spouse: Emilie Auguste Uhland née Vischer
- Parents: Johann Friedrich Uhland (father); Elisabeth née Hoser (mother)
- Relatives: Ludwig Joseph Uhland

Johann Ludwig Uhland (26 April 1787 – 13 November 1862) was a German poet, philologist, literary historian, lawyer and politician.

== Biography ==
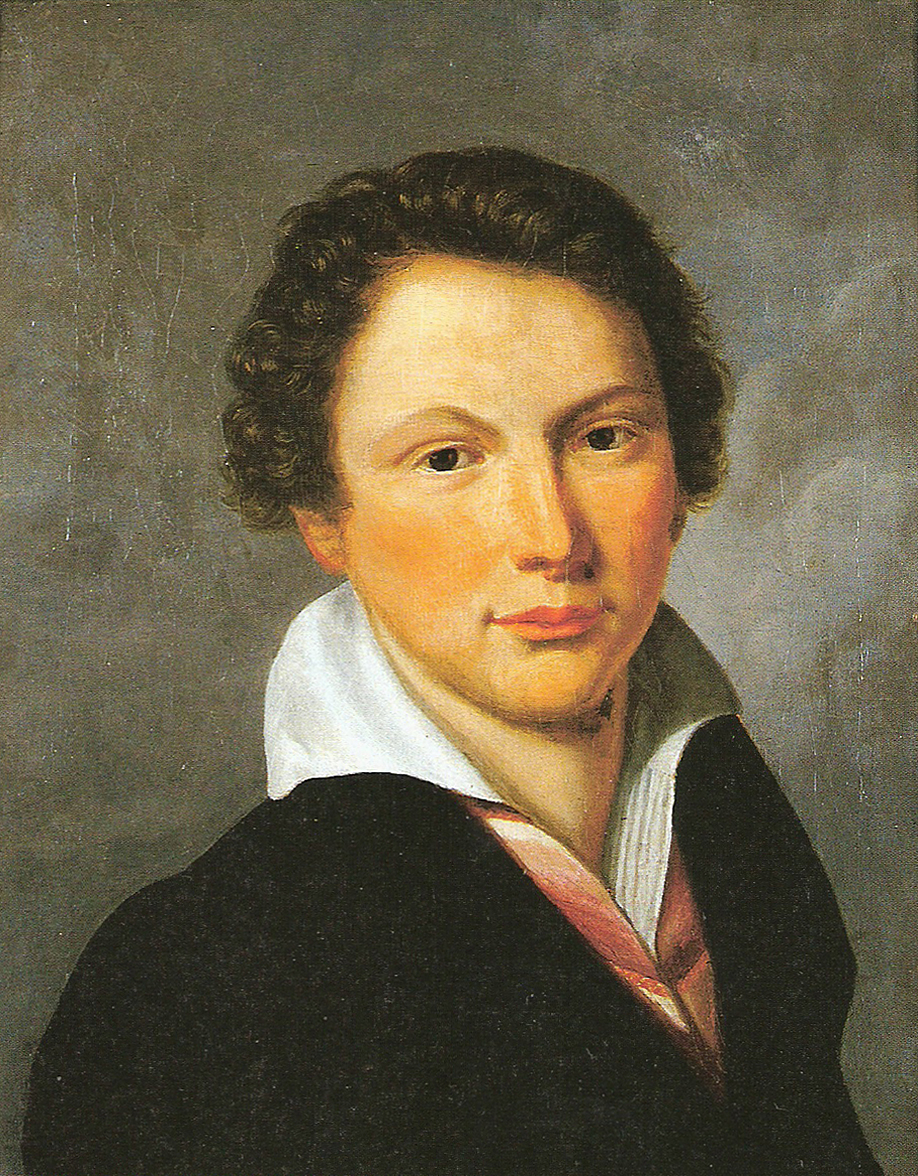
Ludwig Uhland in 1810. Oil on canvas by Christoph Friedrich Dörr

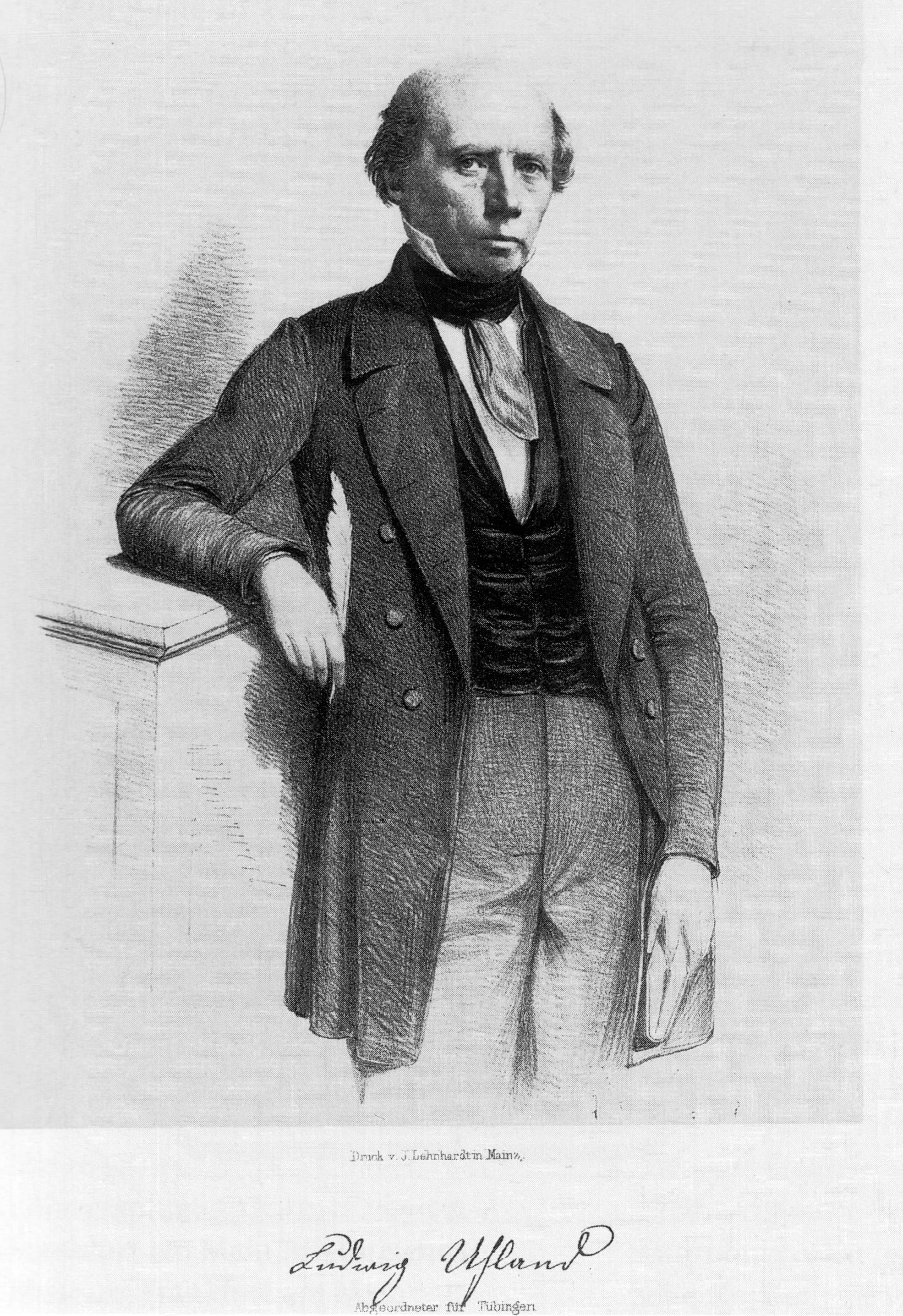
Uhland in 1848

He was born in Tübingen, Württemberg, and studied jurisprudence at the university there, but also took an interest in medieval literature, especially old German and French poetry. Having graduated as a doctor of laws in 1810, he went to Paris for eight months to continue his studies of poetry; and from 1812 to 1814 he worked as a lawyer in Stuttgart, in the bureau of the minister of justice.

=== Poetry ===
He began his career as a poet in 1807 and 1808 by contributing ballads and lyrics to Seckendorff's Musenalmanach; and in 1812 and 1813 he wrote poems for Kerner's Poetischer Almanach and Deutscher Dichterwald. In 1815 he collected his poems in a volume entitled Vaterländische Gedichte, which almost immediately secured a wide circle of readers. To almost every new edition he added some fresh poems. His two dramatic works Ernst, Herzog von Schwaben (1818) and Ludwig der Baier (1819) are unimportant in comparison with his Gedichte.

As a lyric poet, Uhland must be classed with the writers of the German romantic movement. Like them, he found the Middle Ages appealed most strongly to his imagination. Yet his style has a precision, suppleness and grace which distinguish his most characteristic writings from those of the other German romantics. Like them, Uhland wrote poems in defense of human liberty, and in the states assembly of the Kingdom of Württemberg, he played a distinguished part as one of the most vigorous and consistent of the Old Liberals among its members.

=== Politics ===
In 1815, Württemberg was to be granted a new constitution, replacing the old constitution of the Estates of Württemberg (Landstände) which had been abolished in 1806. Uhland became a prominent proponent of the old rights of the estates during the controversy of the following years, which ended in a compromise in 1819 under William I of Württemberg. Uhland went on to serve in the newly created parliament (Landtag) from 1819 until 1826.

In 1829 he was made honorary professor of German literature at the University of Tübingen, but he resigned in 1833, when the post was found to be incompatible with his political views. In 1848 he became a member of the Frankfurt Parliament that convened in the course of the 1848 revolution.

=== Philology and literary history ===
As a Germanic and Romance philologist, Uhland is among the founders of that science. Besides the treatise Ueber das altfranzösische Epos (1812) and an essay Zur Geschichte der Freischiessen (1828), there are to be especially mentioned Walther von der Vogelweide, ein altdeutscher Dichter (1822); Der Mythus von Thôr (1836), the result of the most painstaking original investigation; and the masterly collection Alte hoch- und niederdeutsche Volkslieder (1844–45; 3d ed. 1892). His poetical works were repeatedly published as Gedichte und Dramen, while his scientific work is embodied in Schriften zur Geschichte der Dichtung und Sage, edited by Holland, Keller, and Pfeiffer (1865–72).

He died on 13 November 1862 in Tübingen.

== Translations ==
Longfellow translated some of his pieces into English. Alexander Platt translated his Poems (Leipzig, 1848), W. W. Skeat his Songs and Ballads (London, 1864), and W. C. Sandars his Poems (1869).

== Legacy ==
- One of his best-known poems is "Ich hatt' einen Kameraden", which is an integral part of military funerals.
- A town located south of Austin, Texas, is named in his honor.
- German composer Wilhelmine Schwertzell (1787-1863) used Uland's text in her songs "Abschied" and "Einkehr".
- Lieder composer Pauline Volkstein (1849–1925) also set Uhland's text to music.
