= Gustav Schwab =

German teacher, pastor, author and editor (1792-1850)

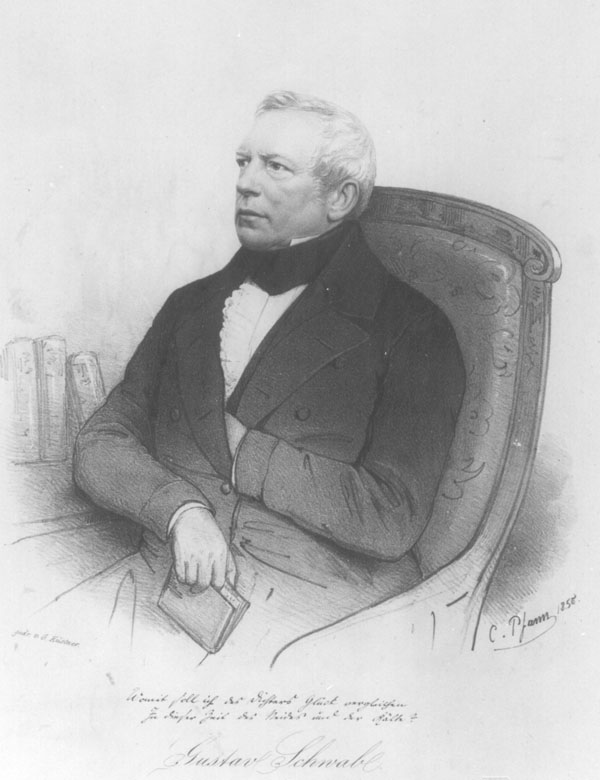
- Born: Gustav Benjamin Schwab; 19 June 1792; Stuttgart, Baden-Württemberg, Germany
- Died: 4 November 1850 (aged 58); Stuttgart, Baden-Württemberg, Germany
- Education: Gymnasium Illustre; University of Tübingen
- Occupations: Writer; pastor; publisher

Gustav Benjamin Schwab (19 June 1792 – 4 November 1850) was a German writer, pastor and publisher.

== Life ==
Gustav Schwab was born in Stuttgart, the son of the philosopher Johann Christoph Schwab. He was introduced to the humanities early in life. After attending Gymnasium Illustre, he studied as a scholar of Tübinger Stift at University of Tübingen, his first two years studying Philology and Philosophy, and thereafter Theology. While at university he established a literary club and became a close friend of Ludwig Uhland, Karl Varnhagen and Justinus Kerner, with whom he published a collection of poems under the title Deutscher Dichterwald.

In the spring of 1813, he made a journey to northern Germany, where he met Johann Wolfgang von Goethe, Friedrich Schleiermacher, Friedrich Rückert, Friedrich de la Motte Fouqué, Adelbert von Chamisso and others. In 1818 he became a high school teacher in Stuttgart, and in 1837 he started work as a pastor in Gomaringen, near Tübingen. In 1841, he moved back to Stuttgart, where he was first pastor and then from 1845 educational counselor for Stuttgart's high school system. In 1847 he received an honorary Doctorate from his old university.

Schwab's collection of myths and legends of antiquity, Sagen des klassischen Altertums, published from 1838 to 1840, was widely used at German schools and became very influential for the reception of classical antiquity in German classrooms. There is a still available English translation with a foreword by Werner Jaeger.

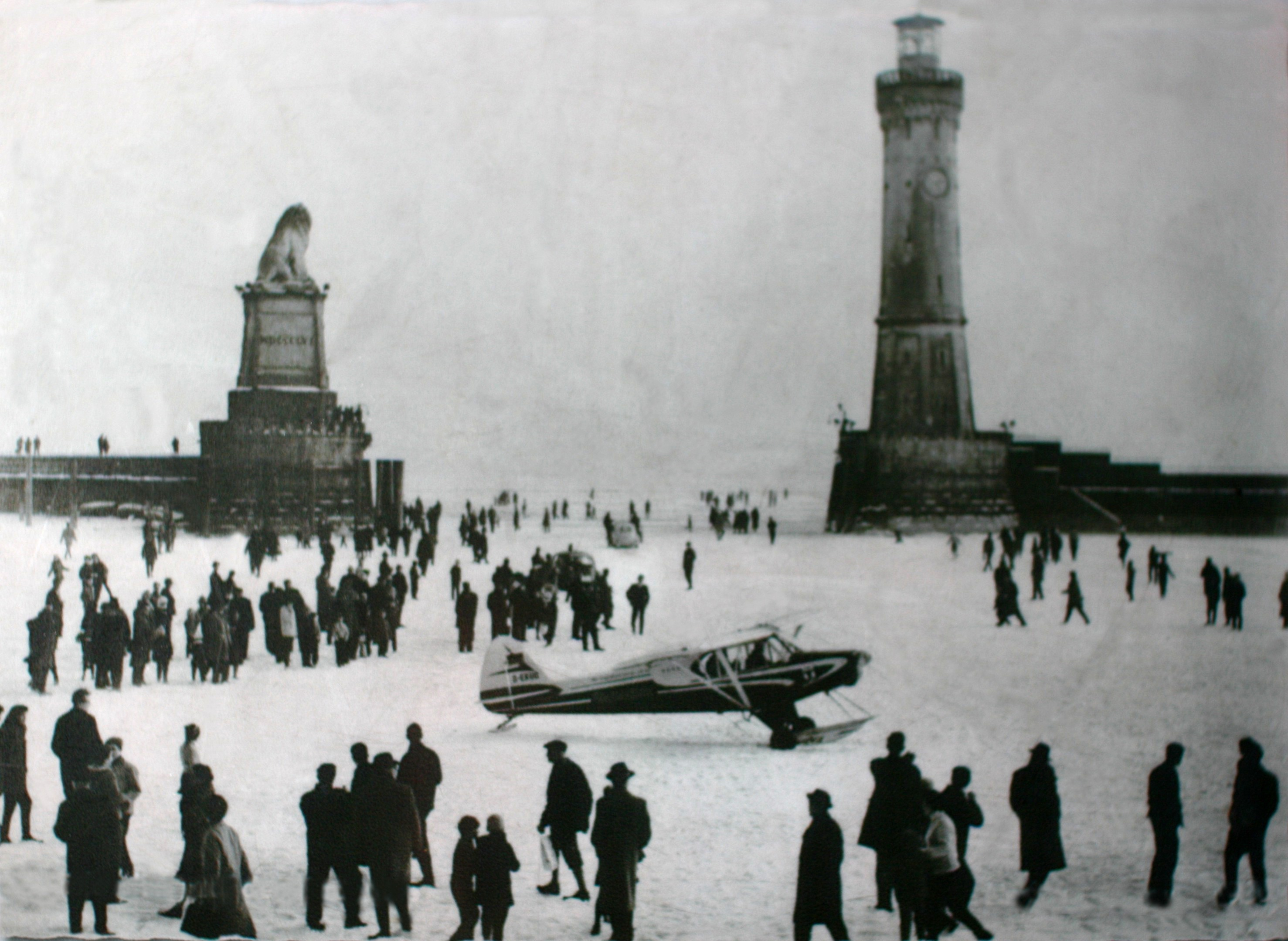
Lake Constance "Seegfrörne" of 1963 at Lindau harbour, with people, an airplane and a Volkswagen on ice

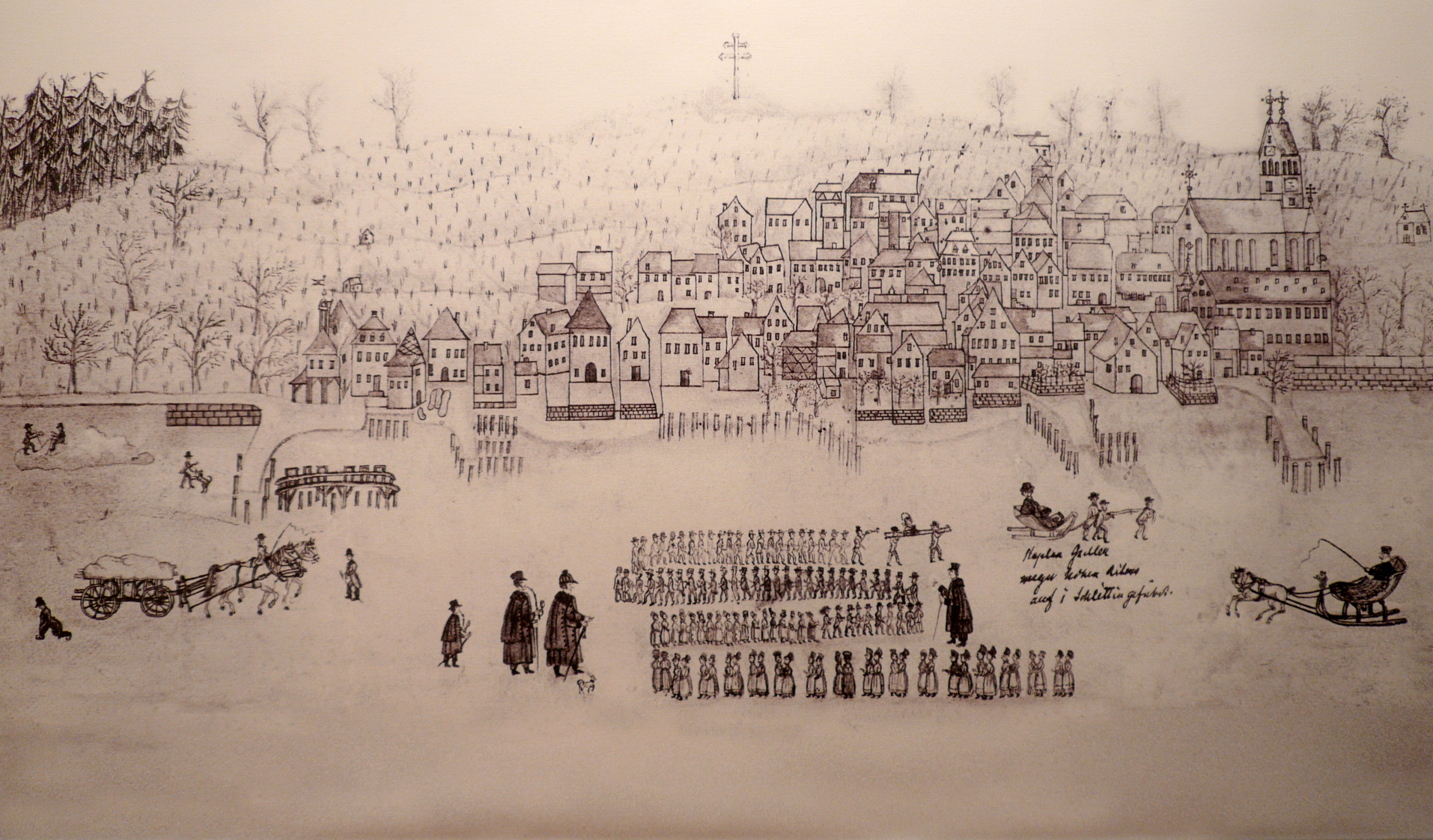
The ice procession in 1830

In his later years, he traveled regularly to Überlingen am Bodensee at Lake Constance to enjoy the waters at the city's spa. The large lake seldom freezes over, an event called "Seegfrörne". The most recent times were 1695, 1788, 1830 (witnessed by Schwab), 1880 and 1963. To celebrate an old tradition, people cross the lake carrying a statue of St. John. In 1830, it was brought from Münsterlingen Switzerland to Hagnau Germany. Conditions in 1880 were unsafe, but on 12 February 1963, a procession of about 2500 people (and one rider) returned the statue to the Swiss which had given it in 1573 to their German neighbors. In the same year, a travelling rider crossed the frozen lake without recognising it as such, and only on the other side was informed about the risk he took inadvertently. In one of Schwab's most famous works, "The Ride over Lake Constance", the rider is so shocked about his lucky deed that he falls from his horse and dies.

Schwab died in Stuttgart in 1850.

== Works ==
- Gedichte (1828)
- Das Buch der schönsten Geschichten und Sagen (1837)
- Sagen des klassischen Altertums (1838–1840)
  - Gods and Heroes: Myths and Epics of Ancient Greece (ISBN 9780394734026)
