= List of people from Connecticut =

State flag of Connecticut

Location of Connecticut in the United States

The following is a list of notable people who were born, raised, or a resident of the U.S. state of Connecticut, with place of birth or residence when known.

== Actors, producers, and directors ==
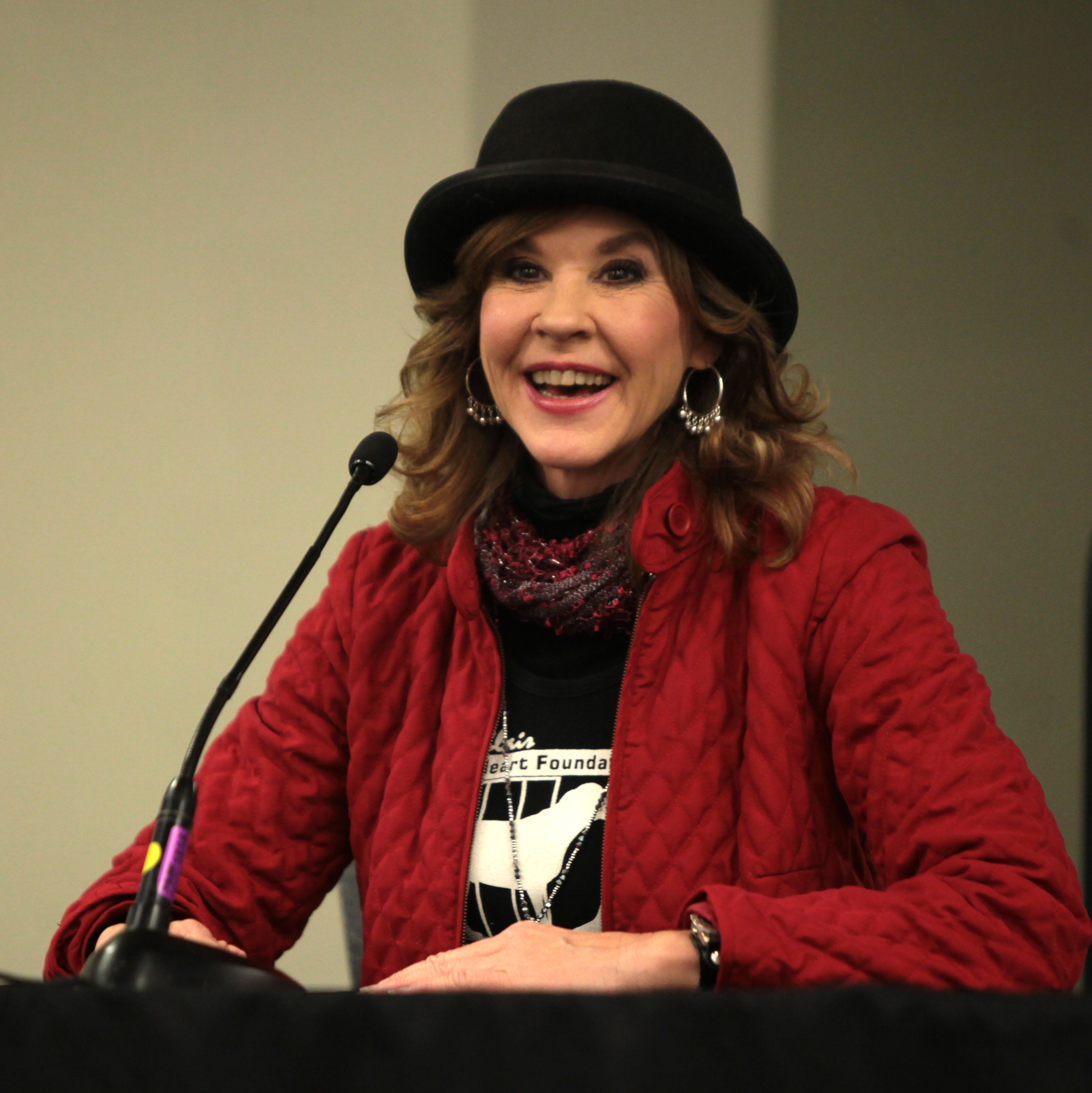
Linda Blair

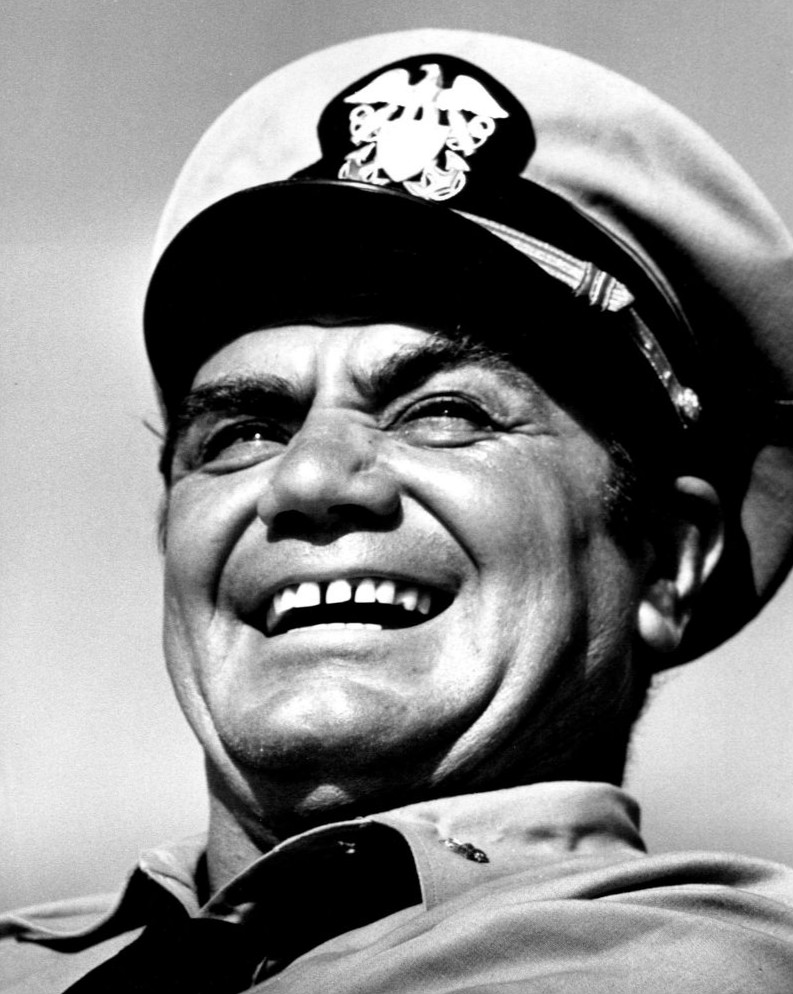
Ernest Borgnine

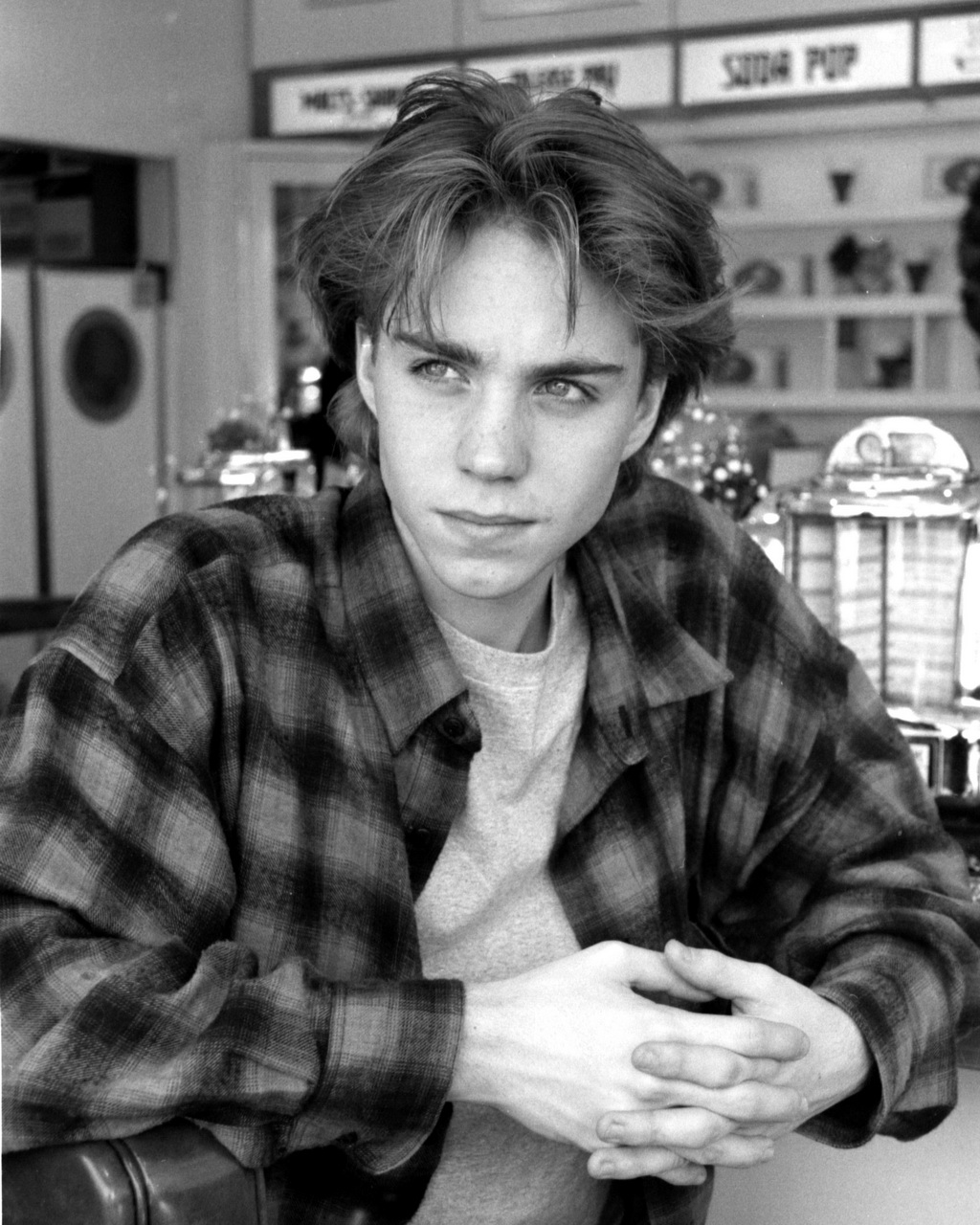
Jonathan Brandis

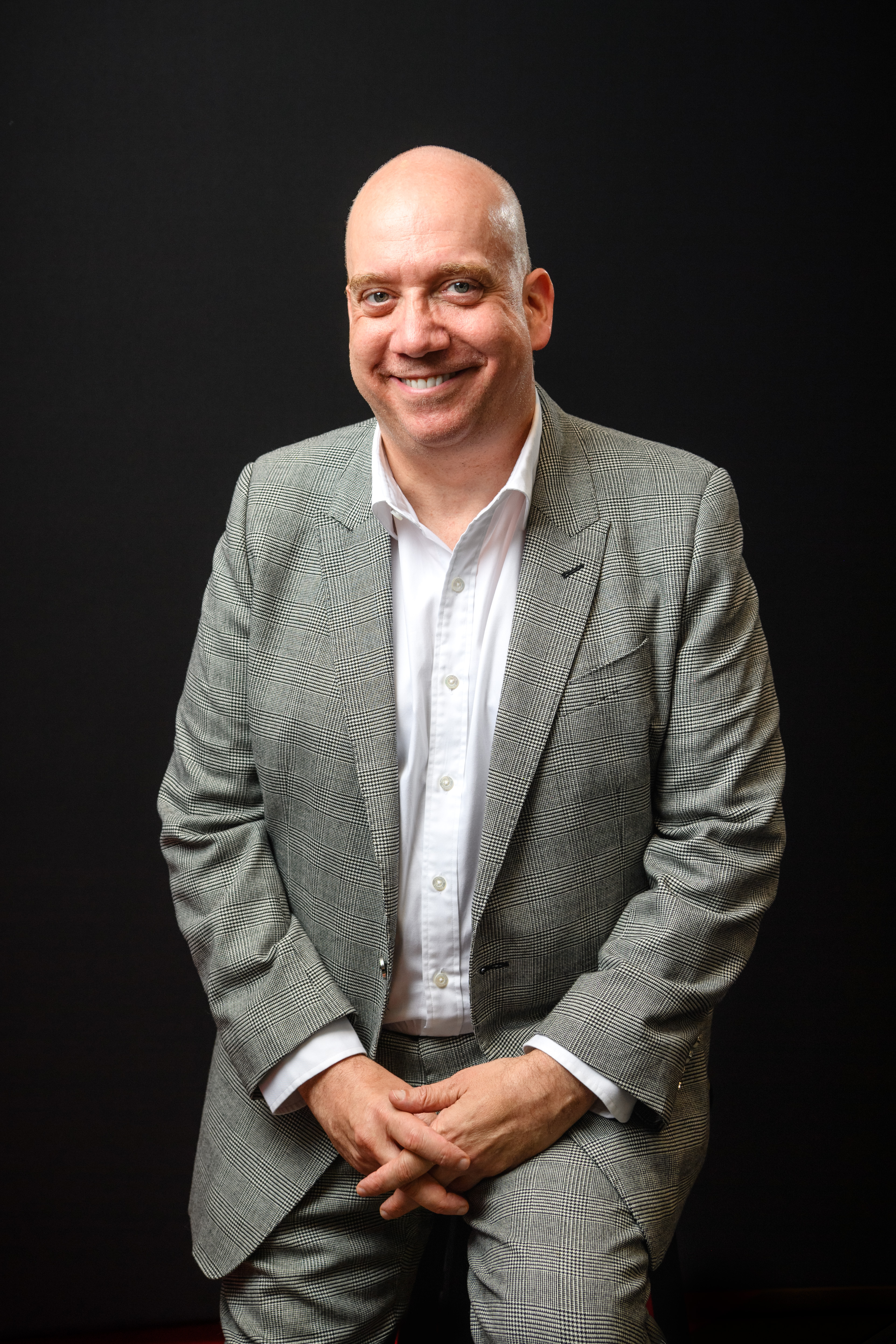
Paul Giamatti

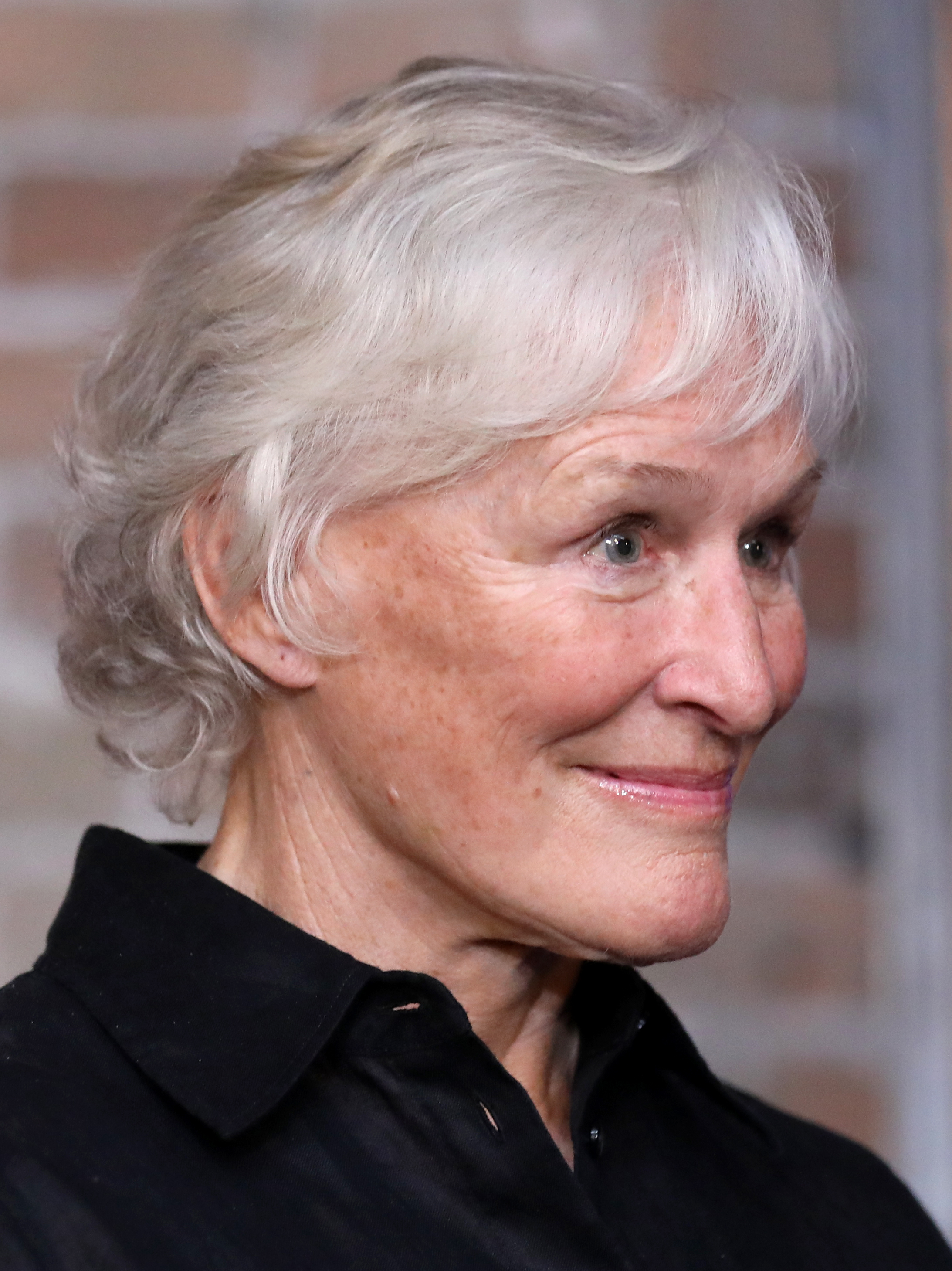
Glenn Close

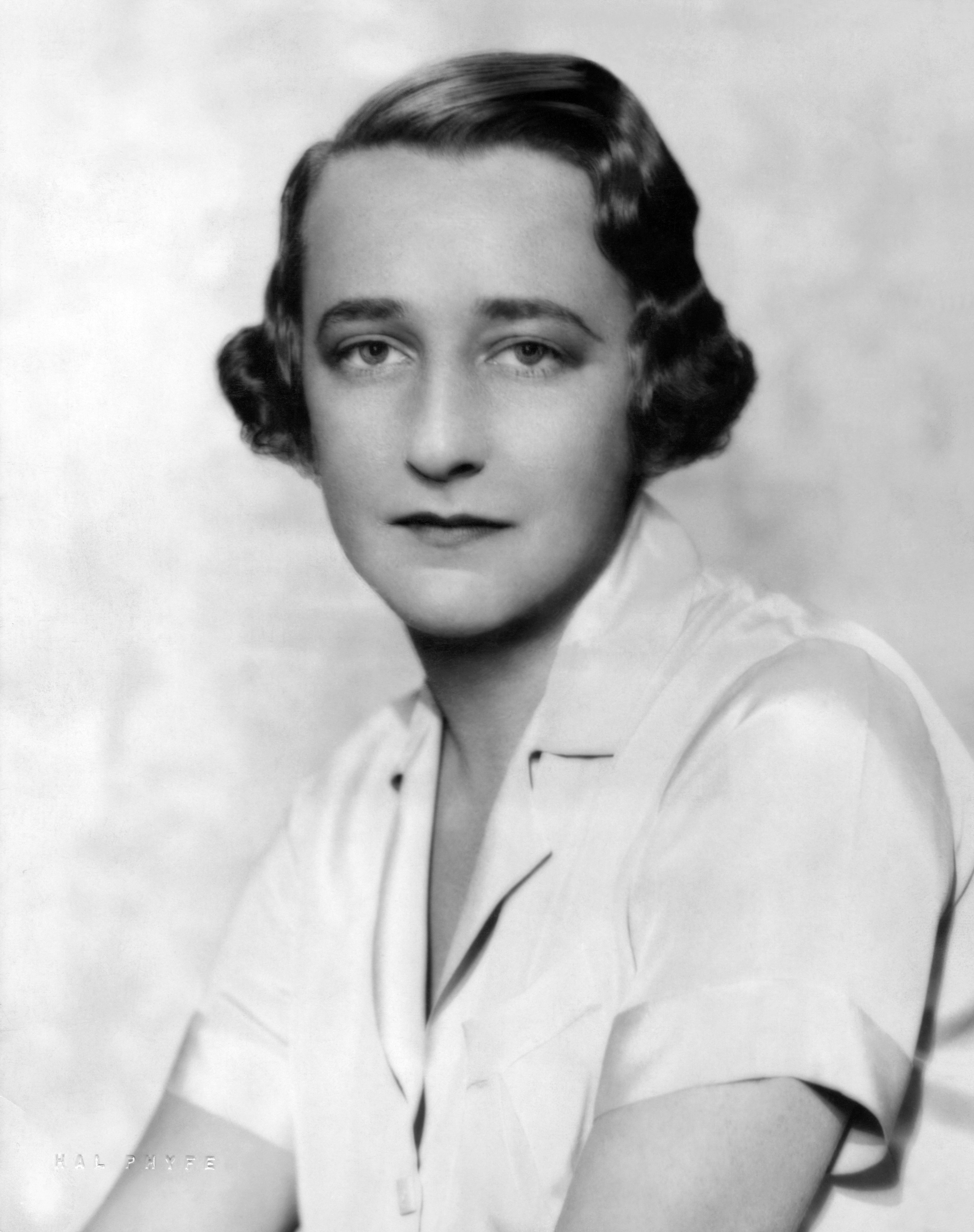
Lillian Hellman

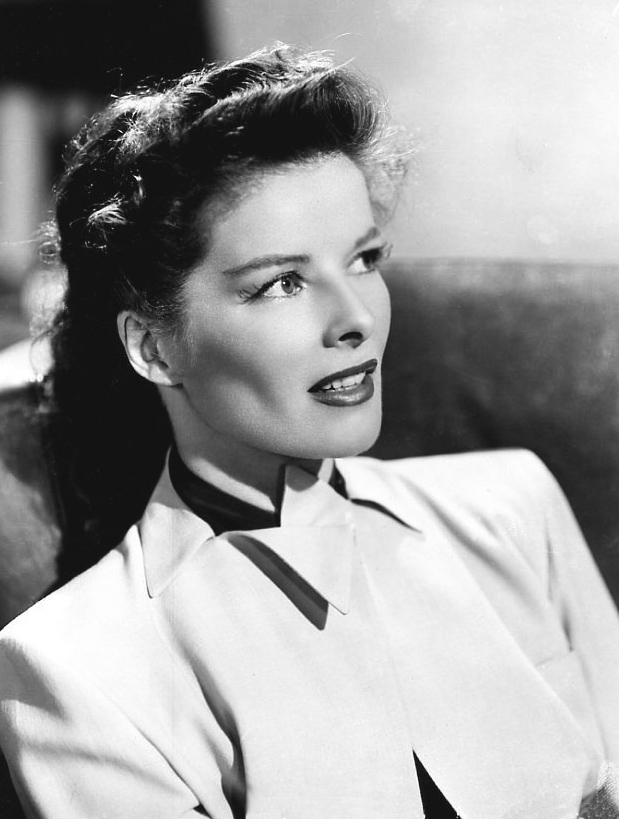
Katharine Hepburn

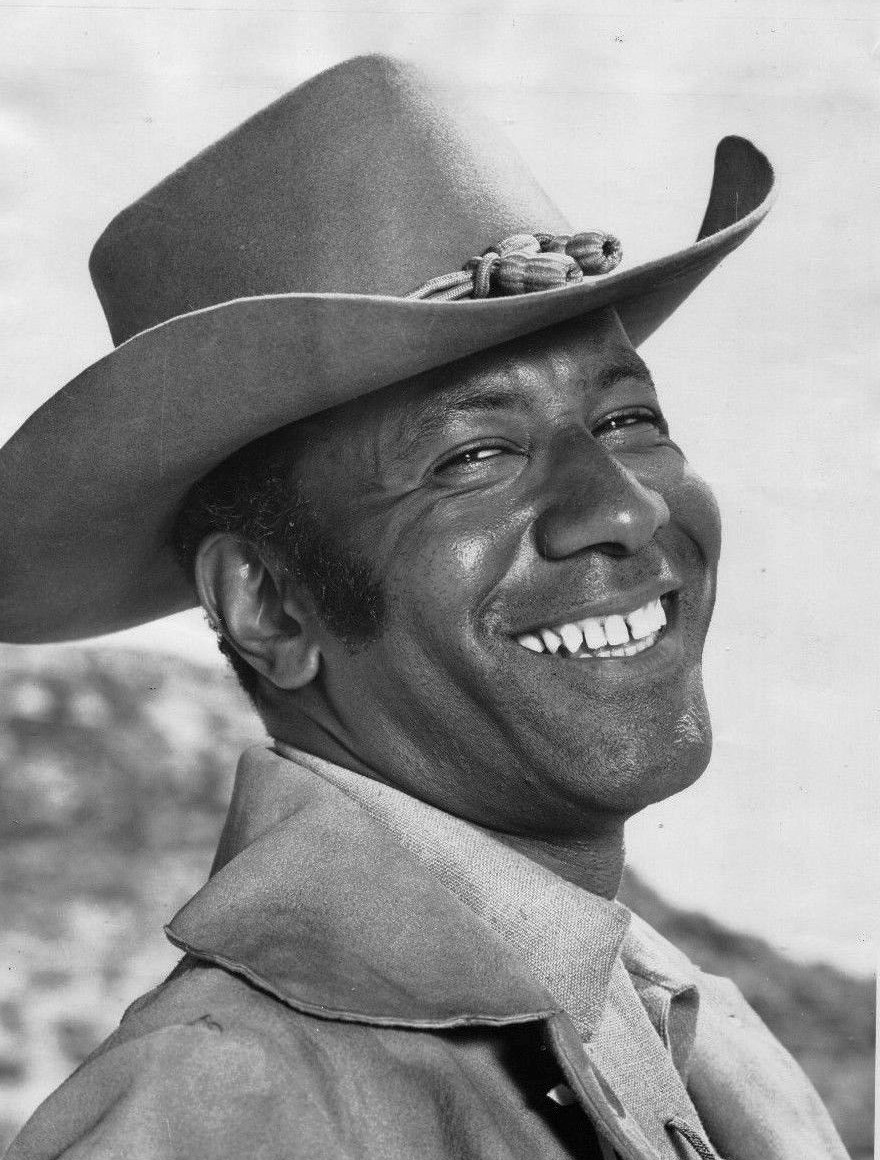
Raymond St. Jacques

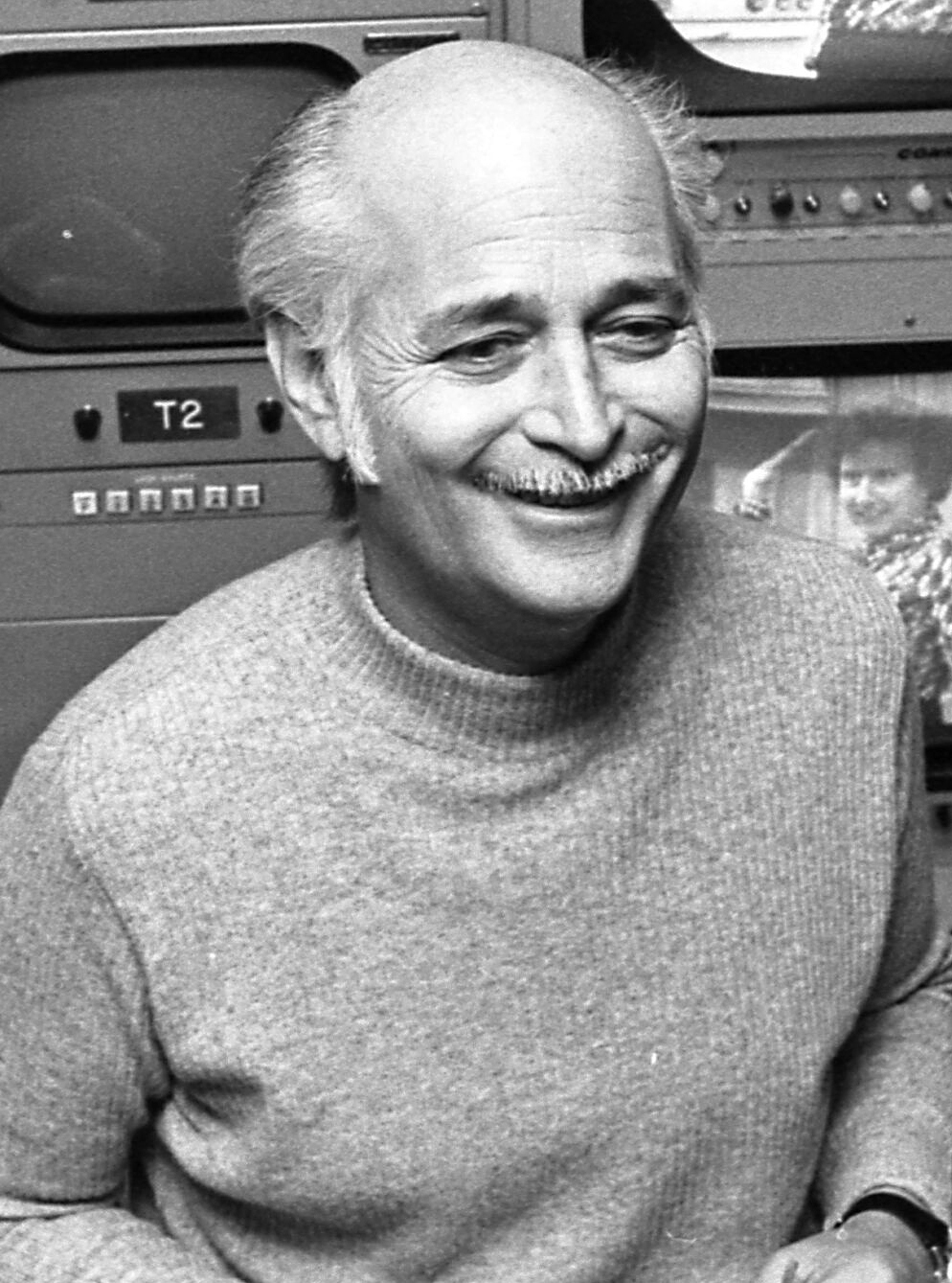
Norman Lear

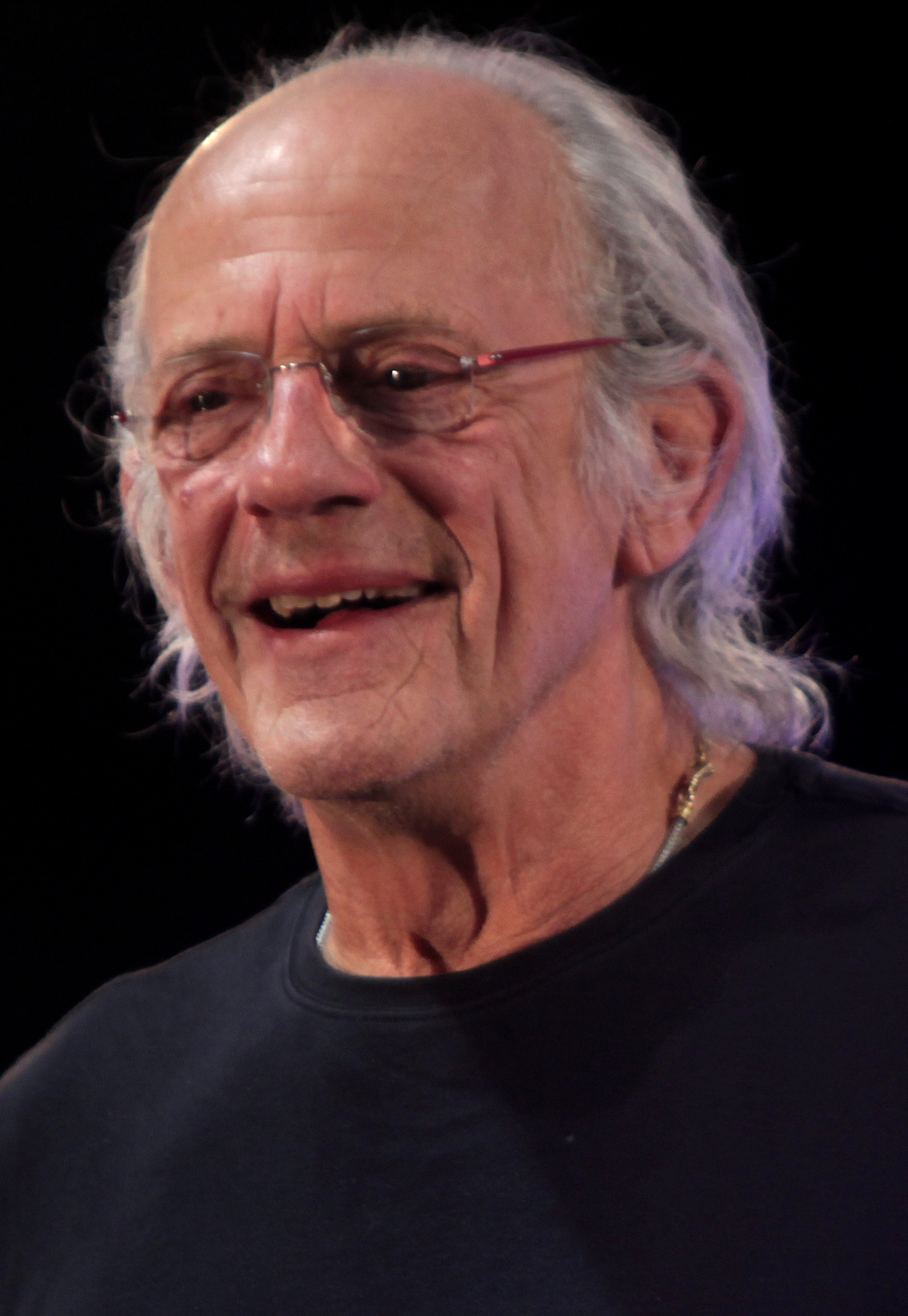
Christopher Lloyd

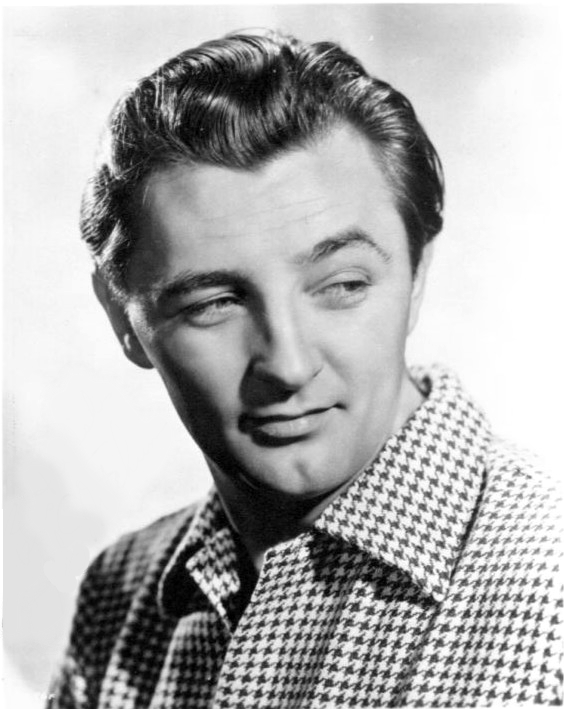
Robert Mitchum

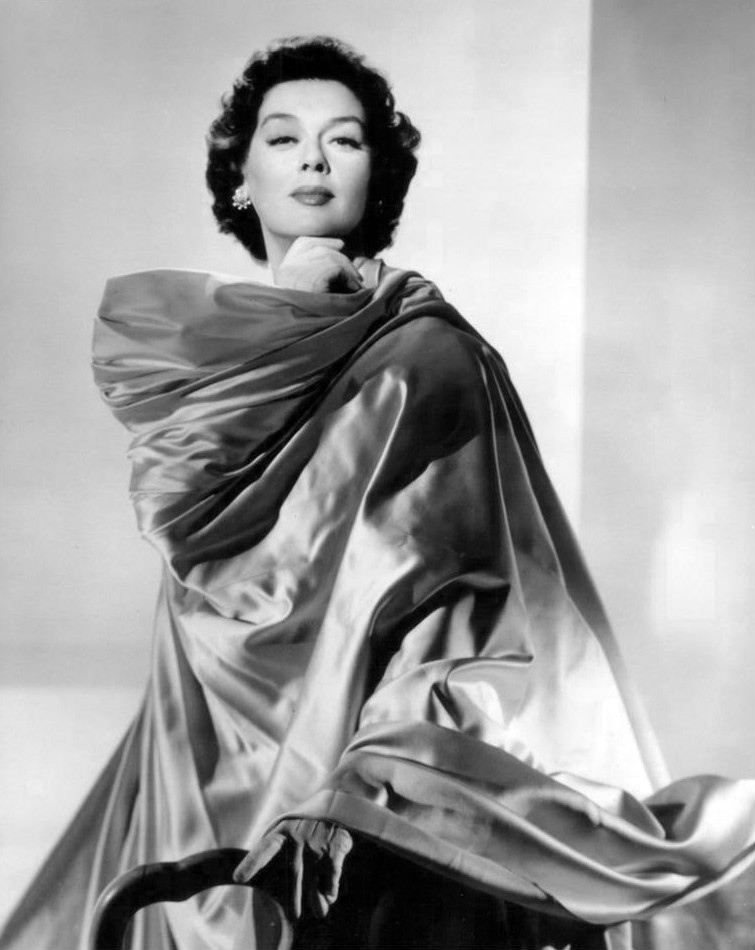
Rosalind Russell

- Christopher Abbott (Greenwich)
- Bruce Altman (New Haven)
- Lauren Ambrose (New Haven)
- Tony Amendola (New Haven)
- Brad Anderson (Madison)
- John Ashton (Enfield)
- William Atherton (Orange)
- Valerie Azlynn (New London)
- Kevin Bacon (Sharon)
- Roger Bart (Norwalk)
- David Alan Basche (Hartford)
- Ryan Michelle Bathe (Stamford)
- Anne Baxter (Easton)
- Graham Beckel (Old Lyme)
- Ed Begley (Hartford)
- Richard Belzer (Bridgeport)
- Polly Bergen (Southbury)
- John Billingsley (Weston)
- Michael Ian Black (Redding)
- Linda Blair (Westport)
- Roberts Blossom (New Haven)
- Ernest Borgnine (Hamden)
- Kate Bosworth (Darien)
- Jesse Bradford (Norwalk)
- Jonathan Brandis (Danbury)
- Alexandra Breckenridge (Bridgeport and Darien)
- Amy Brenneman (Glastonbury)
- Brooke Brodack (Putnam)
- Chris Bruno (Milford)
- Dylan Bruno (Milford)
- Gary Burghoff (Bristol)
- Brooke Burke (Hartford)
- John Byrum (Redding)
- Mary Cadorette (East Hartford)
- Mike Cahill (New Haven)
- David Canary (Wilton)
- Katherine Cannon (Hartford)
- Art Carney (Westbrook)
- D. J. Caruso (Norwalk)
- Adriana Caselotti (Bridgeport)
- Marilyn Chambers (Westport)
- Joe Cipriano (Oakville)
- Spencer Treat Clark (Darien)
- Glenn Close (Greenwich)
- Martha Coolidge (New Haven)
- Daniel Cosgrove (New Haven)
- D.J. Cotrona (Wallingford)
- Bob Crane (Waterbury)
- Jane Curtin (Sharon)
- Dan Curtis (Bridgeport)
- Paul Dano (Wilton)
- Jules Dassin (Middletown)
- Jeff Davis (Milford)
- Dana Delany (Stamford)
- Brian Dennehy (Bridgeport)
- Jenna Dewan (Hartford)
- George DiCenzo (New Haven)
- Allie DiMeco (Waterbury)
- Troy Duffy (Hartford)
- Charles H. Eglee (New Haven)
- Jill Eikenberry (New Haven)
- Abby Elliott (Wilton)
- Linda Evans (Hartford)
- Mark Famiglietti (Clinton)
- Michael J. Fox (Sharon)
- Kevin Foxe (Enfield)
- Will Friedle (Hartford)
- Paul Fusco (New Haven)
- Catherine Gardner (Waterbury)
- Marcus Giamatti (New Haven)
- Paul Giamatti (New Haven)
- Cynthia Gibb (Westport)
- William Gillette (Hartford)
- Grant Goodeve (Middlebury)
- Topher Grace (Darien)
- David Marshall Grant (Westport)
- Luke Greenfield (Westport)
- Shelley Hack (Greenwich)
- June Havoc (Wilton)
- Sterling Hayden (Wilton)
- Glenne Headly (New London)
- Jessica Hecht (Bloomfield)
- Kevin Heffernan (West Haven)
- Katherine Heigl (New Canaan)
- Lillian Hellman (New Milford)
- Katharine Hepburn (Hartford)
- Linda Hunt (Westport)
- Allison Janney (Lakeville)
- Arline Judge (Bridgeport)
- Adam Kaufman (New Canaan)
- Elia Kazan (Newtown)
- Lisa Robin Kelly (Southington)
- Ted Knight (Terryville)
- David LaChapelle (Fairfield)
- Lisa Lampanelli (Trumbull)
- Hope Lange (Redding)
- Eriq La Salle (Hartford)
- Matt Lauer (Greenwich)
- Adam LaVorgna (North Branford)
- Norman Lear (New Haven)
- Denis Leary (Roxbury)
- David Letterman (New Canaan)
- Barry Levinson (Redding)
- Paul Lieberstein (Westport)
- Mark Linn-Baker (Wethersfield)
- Christopher Lloyd (Stamford)
- Michelle Lombardo (Glastonbury)
- Justin Long (Fairfield)
- Billy Lush (New Haven)
- Seth MacFarlane (Kent)
- Fredric March (New Milford)
- Pamela Sue Martin (Westport)
- Dylan McDermott (Waterbury)
- Biff McGuire (New Haven)
- Stephanie McMahon (Weston)
- Jesse Metcalfe (New London)
- Steve Miner (Westport)
- Robert Mitchum (Bridgeport)
- Gretchen Mol (Deep River)
- Marilyn Monroe (Weston and Roxbury)
- Sheri Moon (Plainville)
- Jonathan Mostow (Woodbridge)
- Michael G. Moye (New Haven)
- Marty Munsch (Greenwich)
- George Murphy (New Haven)
- Ellen Muth (Milford)
- David Naughton (Hartford)
- James Naughton (Middletown)
- Kevin Nealon (Bridgeport)
- Paul Newman (Westport)
- Becki Newton (New Haven)
- Tom Noonan (Greenwich)
- Fred Norris (Willimantic)
- Nolan North (New Haven)
- Ron Palillo (Cheshire)
- Joe Pantoliano (Wilton)
- Don Pardo (Norwich)
- Dean Parisot (Wilton)
- Paul Perri (New Haven)
- Bijou Phillips (Greenwich)
- Jacob Pitts (Weston)
- Tracy Pollan (Sharon)
- Anthony Tyler Quinn (New London)
- John Ratzenberger (Bridgeport)
- Evan Rogers (Mansfield)
- Christy Carlson Romano (Milford)
- Anika Noni Rose (Bloomfield)
- Sherrie Rose (Hartford)
- Matt Ross (Greenwich)
- Rosalind Russell (Waterbury)
- Meg Ryan (Bethel and Fairfield)
- Peter Sarsgaard (Fairfield)
- Michael Schur (West Hartford)
- Annabella Sciorra (Wethersfield)
- Kyra Sedgwick (Sharon)
- Chloë Sevigny (Darien)
- Louise Shaffer (Woodbridge)
- Spec Shea (Naugatuck)
- Micah Sloat (Westport)
- Patricia Smith (New Haven)
- Bill Smitrovich (Bridgeport)
- Zack Snyder (Greenwich)
- Raymond St. Jacques (Hartford)
- David H. Steinberg (West Hartford)
- Austin Stowell (Kensington)
- Tara Subkoff (Westport)
- Ed Sullivan (Southbury)
- Larry Sullivan (New Haven)
- Pawel Szajda (Farmington)
- Lee Tergesen (Ivoryton)
- Mark Tinker (Stamford)
- Tony Todd (Hartford)
- Jim True-Frost (Greenwich)
- Tom Tryon (Hartford)
- Raviv Ullman (Fairfield)
- James Van Der Beek (Cheshire)
- Gus Van Sant (Darien)
- Diane Venora (East Hartford)
- Jenna von Oÿ (Stamford)
- Wende Wagner (New London)
- Christopher Walken (Wilton)
- Tonja Walker (Easton)
- Deborah Walley (Bridgeport)
- Sam Waterston (Sharon)
- Michael Weatherly (Fairfield)
- Bruce Weitz (Norwalk)
- Titus Welliver (New Haven)
- Michael Jai White (Bridgeport and New Haven)
- Treat Williams (Norwalk)
- Fay Wolf (Fairfield)
- Joanne Woodward (Westport)
- Kari Wührer (Brookfield)
- Madeline Zima (New Haven)
- Rachel Sennott (Simsbury)

== Athletes ==
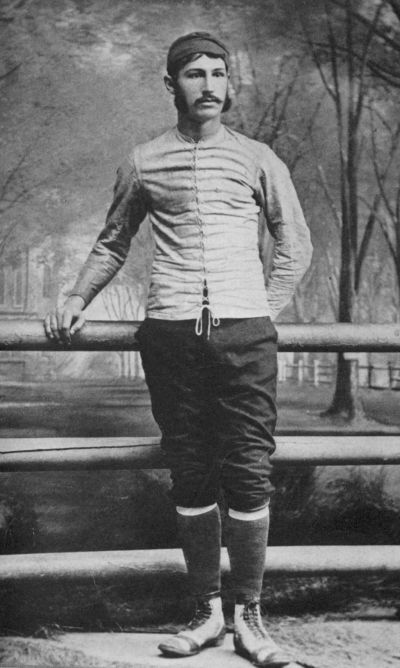
Walter Camp

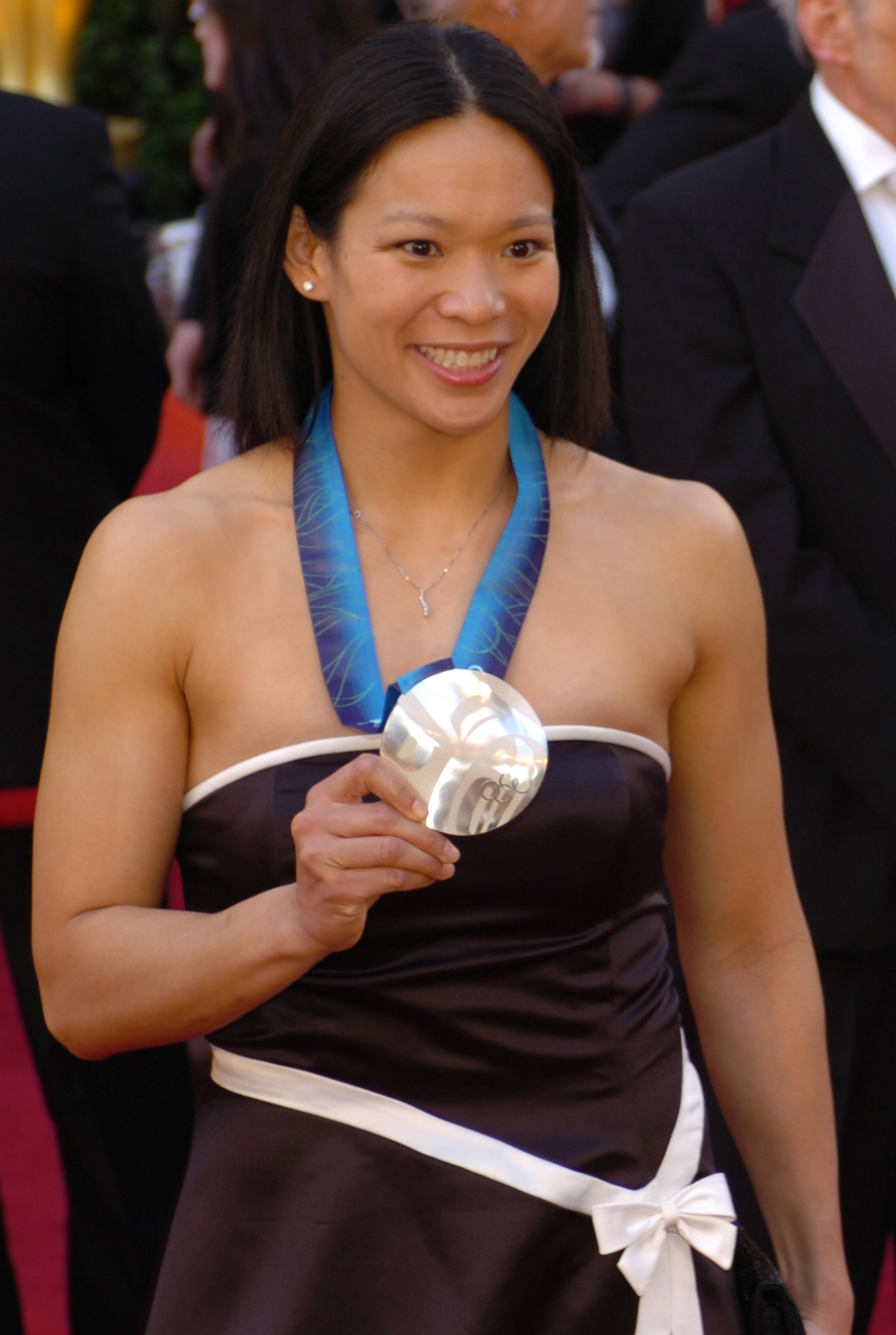
Julie Chu

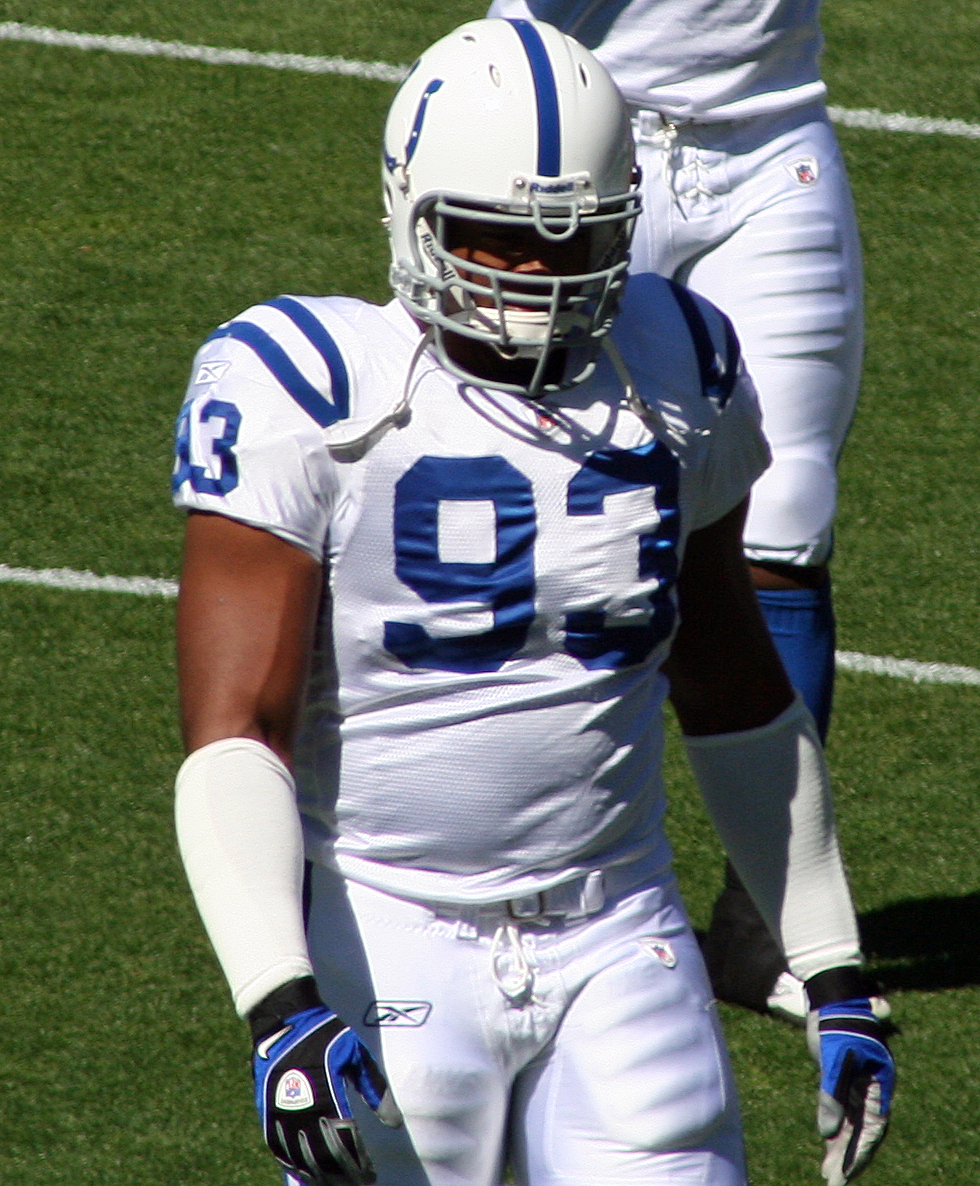
Dwight Freeney

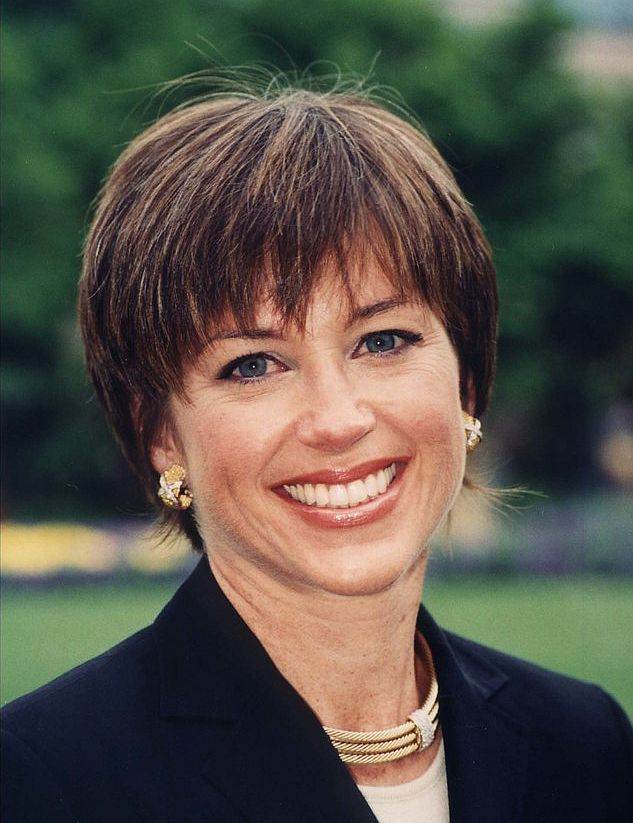
Dorothy Hamill

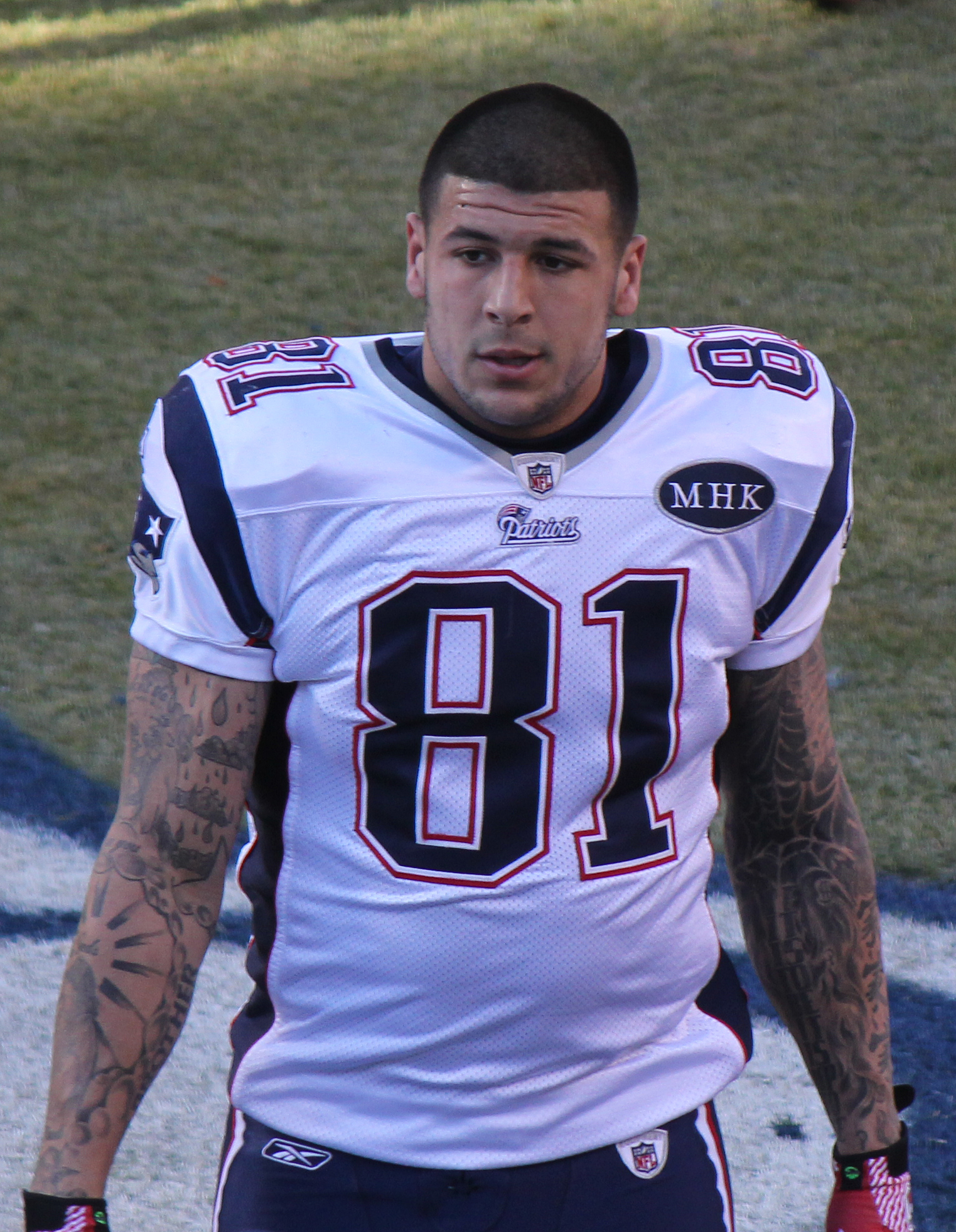
Aaron Hernandez

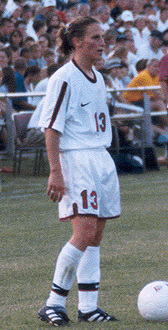
Kristine Lilly

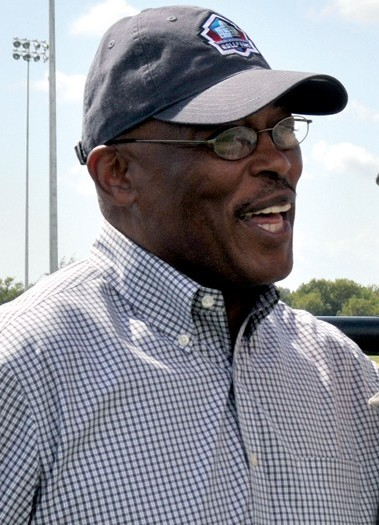
Floyd Little

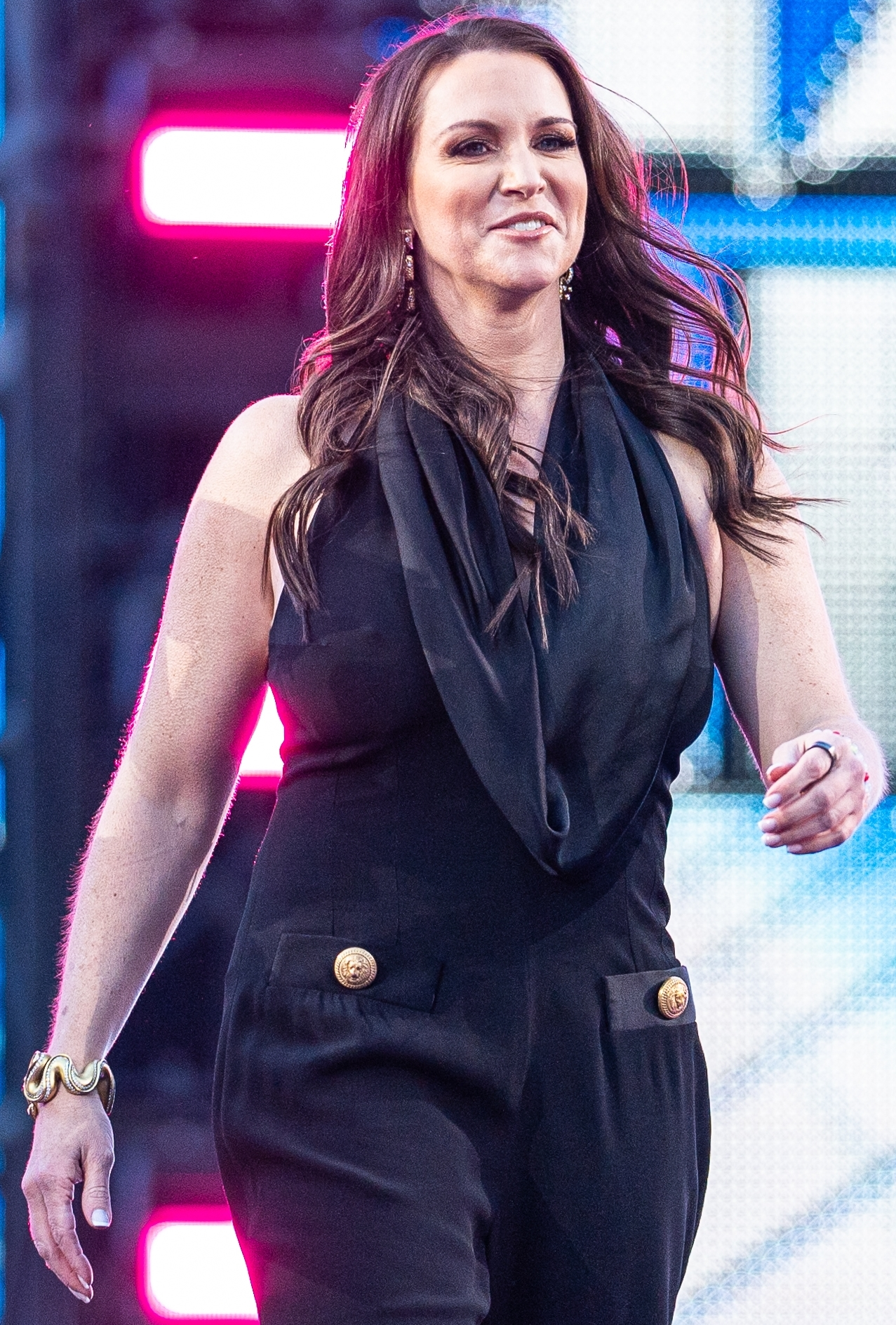
Stephanie McMahon

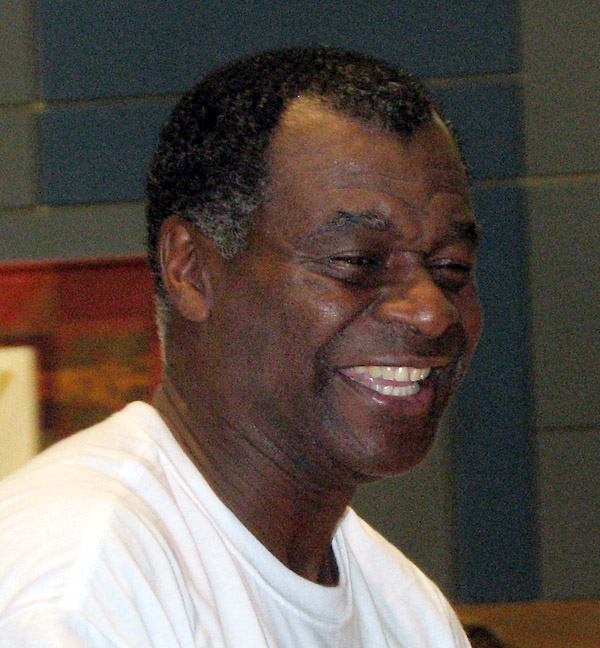
Calvin Murphy

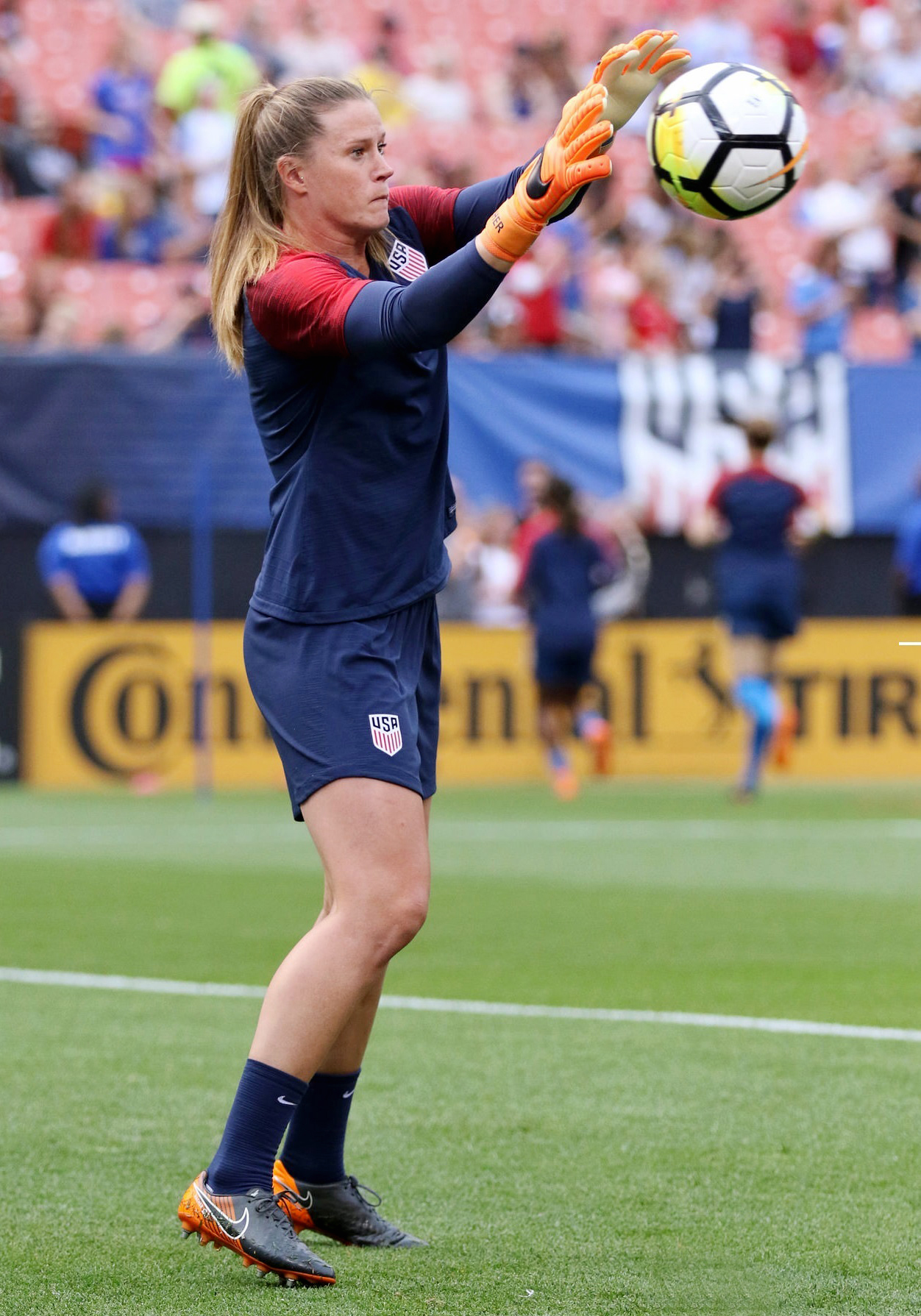
Alyssa Naeher

- Brad Ausmus (Cheshire)
- John Bagley (Bridgeport)
- Jeff Bagwell (Killingworth)
- Chris Baker (Windsor)
- Vin Baker (Old Saybrook)
- Matt Barnes (Bethel)
- Semyon Belits-Geiman (Stamford)
- Keith Bennett, American-Israeli basketball player (Stamford)
- James Blake (Fairfield)
- Steve Blass (Canaan)
- Andy Bloom (Stamford)
- Nick Bonino (Farmington)
- Craig Breslow (New Haven)
- Scott Burrell (Hamden)
- Donn Cabral (Glastonbury)
- Marcus Camby (South Windsor)
- Walter Camp (New Britain)
- Dave Campo (Groton)
- Howard Cann (Bridgeport)
- Jack Capuano (Kent)
- Jesse Carlson (New Britain)
- Julie Chu (Fairfield)
- Aaron Civale (East Windsor)
- Chris Clark (South Windsor)
- Jaidon Codrington (Bridgeport)
- Roger Connor (Waterbury)
- Marcus Cooper (Bloomfield)
- Brock Coyle (Norwalk)
- Carmen Cozza (Orange)
- Dan Cramer (Stamford)
- Tommy Cross (Simsbury)
- Jerome Cunningham (Waterbury)
- Rajai Davis (Norwich)
- Chad Dawson (New Haven)
- Brian Dayett (New London)
- Ryan Delaire (Bloomfield)
- Chris Denorfia (Bristol)
- John DiBartolomeo (Westport)
- Rob Dibble (Southington)
- Walt Dropo (Moosup)
- Andre Drummond (Middletown)
- Chris Drury (Trumbull)
- Ted Drury (Trumbull)
- Vladimir Ducasse (Stamford)
- Marcus Easley (Bridgeport)
- David Efianayi (Manchester)
- Johnny Egan (Hartford)
- Dwight Freeney (Bloomfield)
- Kevin Gilbride (New Haven)
- Mike Gminski (Monroe)
- Ryan Gomes (Waterbury)
- Jesse Hahn (Norwich)
- Ron Hainsey (Bolton)
- Dorothy Hamill (Greenwich)
- Matt Harvey (Groton)
- Anttaj Hawthorne (Hamden)
- Doug Henry (Torrington)
- J. J. Henry (Fairfield)
- Aaron Hernandez (Bristol)
- Jared Hughes (Stamford)
- John Jenkins (Meriden)
- Caitlyn Jenner (Newtown)
- Jay Johnstone (Manchester)
- Byron Jones (New Britain)
- Tebucky Jones (New Britain)
- Tyrique Jones
- Joan Joyce (Waterbury)
- Terrance Knighton (Hartford)
- Paul Konerko (Norwich)
- Niko Koutouvides (Plainville)
- Brian Leetch (Cheshire)
- Ivan Lendl (Goshen)
- Dominic Leone (Norwich)
- Kristine Lilly (Wilton)
- Floyd Little (New Haven)
- Rebecca Lobo (Hartford)
- Joey Logano (Middletown)
- Cliff Louis (Stamford)
- Rick Mahorn (Hartford)
- Wes Matthews (Bridgeport)
- Dick McAuliffe (Farmington)
- John McDonald (New London)
- Mike McGuirl (Hartford)
- Stephanie McMahon (Greenwich)
- Paul Menhart (Mystic)
- Johnny Moore (Waterbury)
- George H. Morris (New Canaan)
- Charlie Morton (Redding)
- Calvin Murphy (Norwalk)
- Phil Murphy (New London)
- Jerry Nadeau (Danbury)
- Alyssa Naeher (Bridgeport)
- Charles Nagy (Fairfield)
- Nick Newell (Milford)
- Mary Anne O'Connor (Fairfield)
- Lamar Odom (New Britain)
- Mike Olt (Branford)
- Dan Orlovsky (Shelton)
- Jim O'Rourke (Bridgeport)
- Max Pacioretty (New Canaan)
- Paul Pasqualoni (Cheshire)
- Carl Pavano (Southington)
- Eli Pemberton
- Willie Pep (Middletown)
- Jimmy Piersall (Waterbury)
- Nick Pietrosante (Derby)
- A. J. Pollock (Hebron)
- Ryan Preece (Berlin)
- Jonathan Quick (Milford)
- Randy Rasmussen (Wilton)
- David Reed (New Britain)
- Jordan Reed (New Britain)
- Charlie Reiter (Westport)
- Jamey Richard (Weston)
- Andy Robustelli (Stamford)
- Bill Rodgers (Hartford)
- Bill Romanowski (Vernon)
- Maxie Rosenbloom (Leonard Bridge)
- Bob Schaefer (Putnam)
- Evan Scribner (New Milford)
- Julius Seligson (Westport)
- Dan Shannon (Bridgeport)
- Scott Sharp (Norwalk)
- Jimmy Shea (West Hartford)
- Emmet Sheehan (Darien)
- Jeff Simmons (Hartford)
- Dan Sileo (Stamford)
- Bob Skoronski (Ansonia)
- Charles Smith (Bridgeport)
- Chris Smith (Bridgeport)
- Kieran Smith (Ridgefield)
- Will Solomon, basketball player (Hartford)
- Tony Sparano (West Haven)
- Jack Spellman (Middletown)
- Amari Spievey (Middletown)
- George Springer (New Britain)
- Ken Strong (West Haven)
- John Sullivan (Greenwich)
- Glover Teixeira (Danbury)
- Tim Teufel (Greenwich)
- Tom Thibodeau (New Britain)
- Donald Thomas (New Haven)
- Marcus Tracy (Newtown)
- Triple H (Weston)
- Dick Tuckey (Naugatuck)
- Will Tye (Middletown)
- Bobby Valentine (Stamford)
- Stephen Valiquette (Orange)
- Mo Vaughn (Norwalk)
- Dave Wallace (Waterbury)
- Björn Werner (Salisbury)
- Jordan Williams (Torrington)
- Ron Wotus (Hartford)
- Steve Young (Greenwich)
- Josh Zeid (New Haven)

== Authors, artists, and educators ==
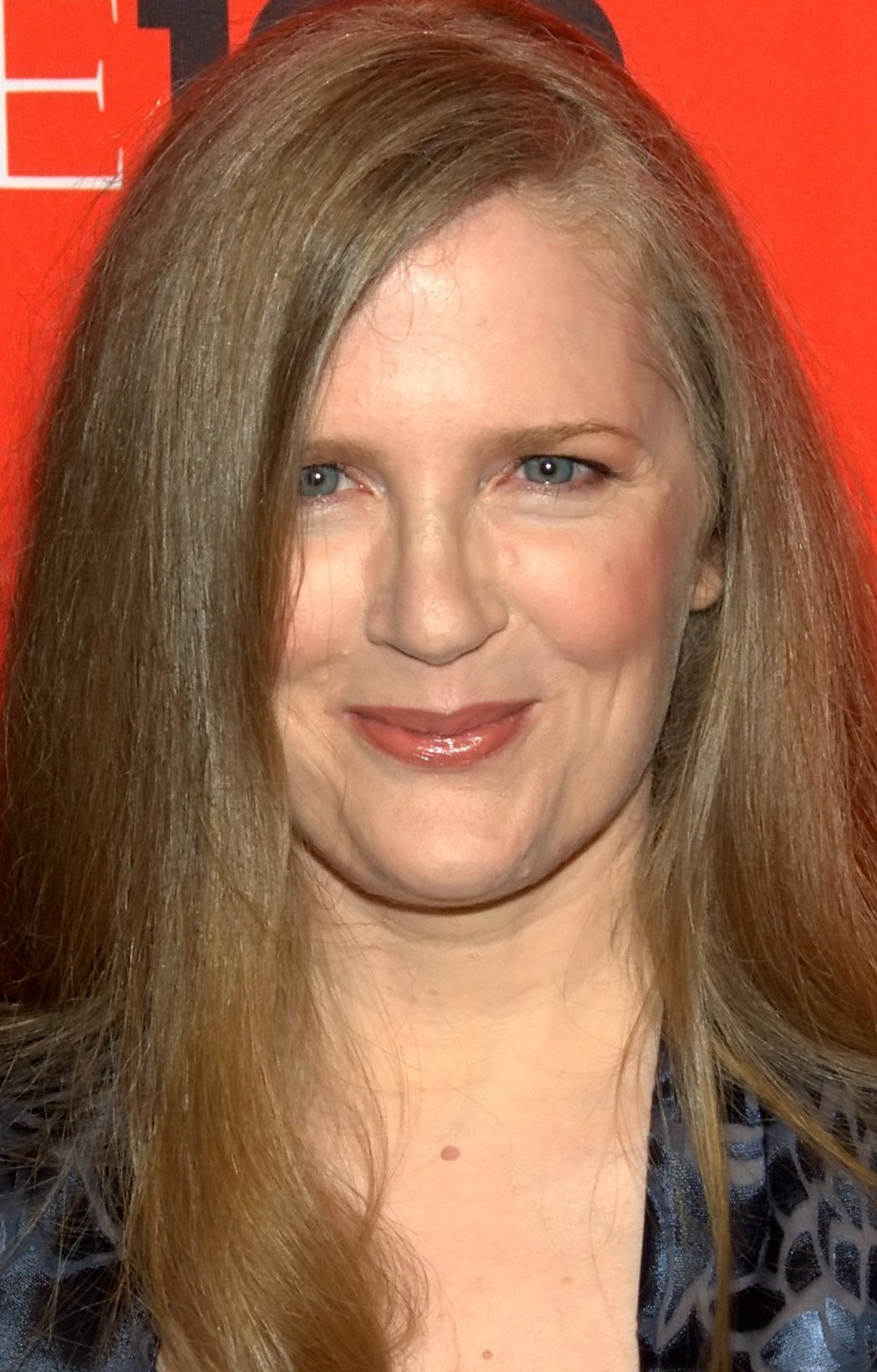
Suzanne Collins

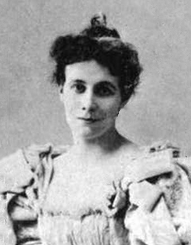
Harriet Ford

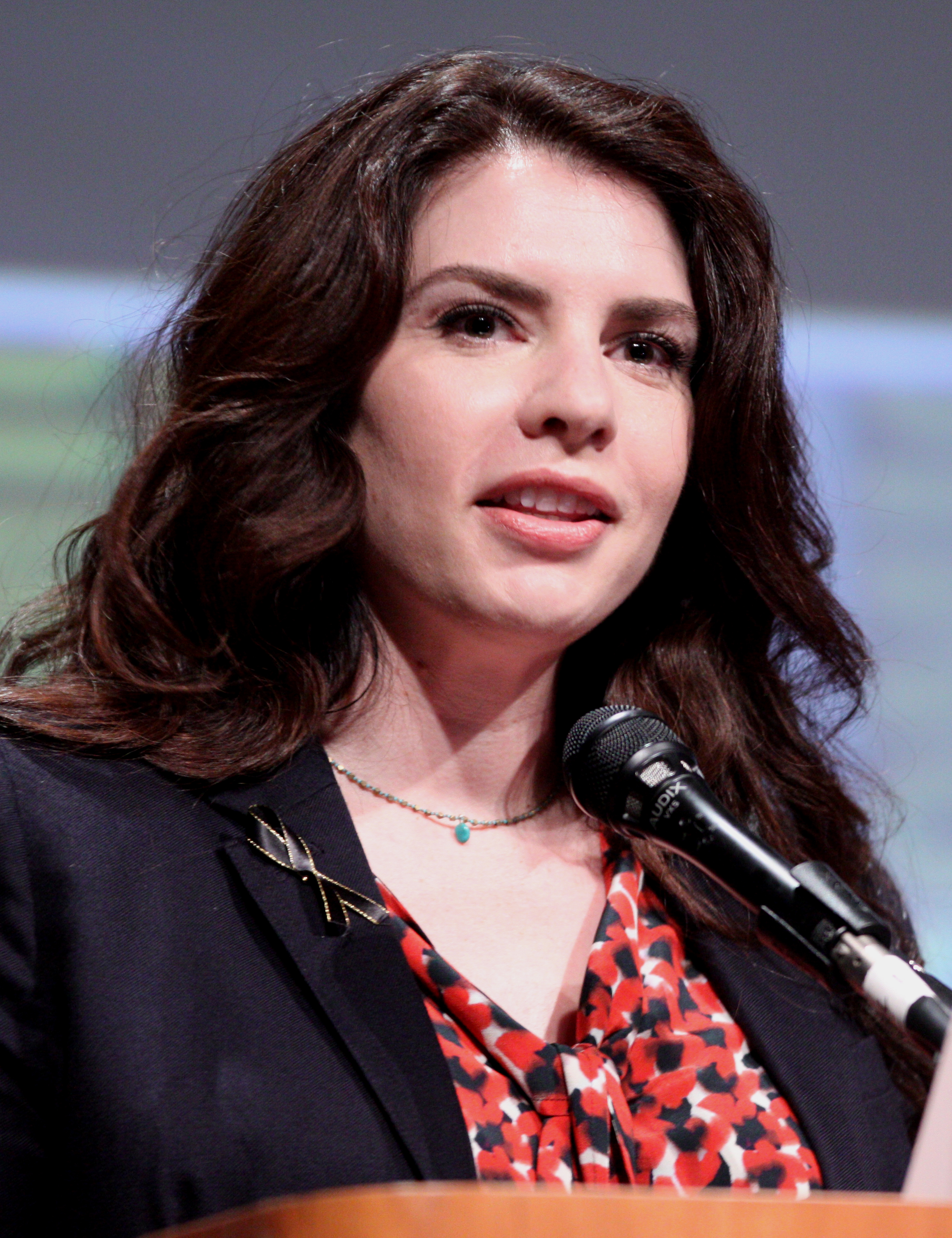
Stephenie Meyer

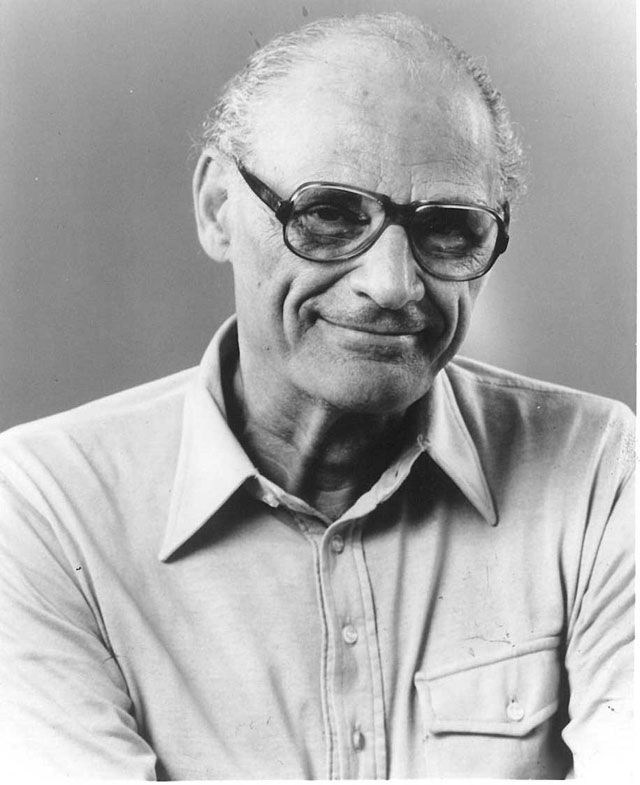
Arthur Miller

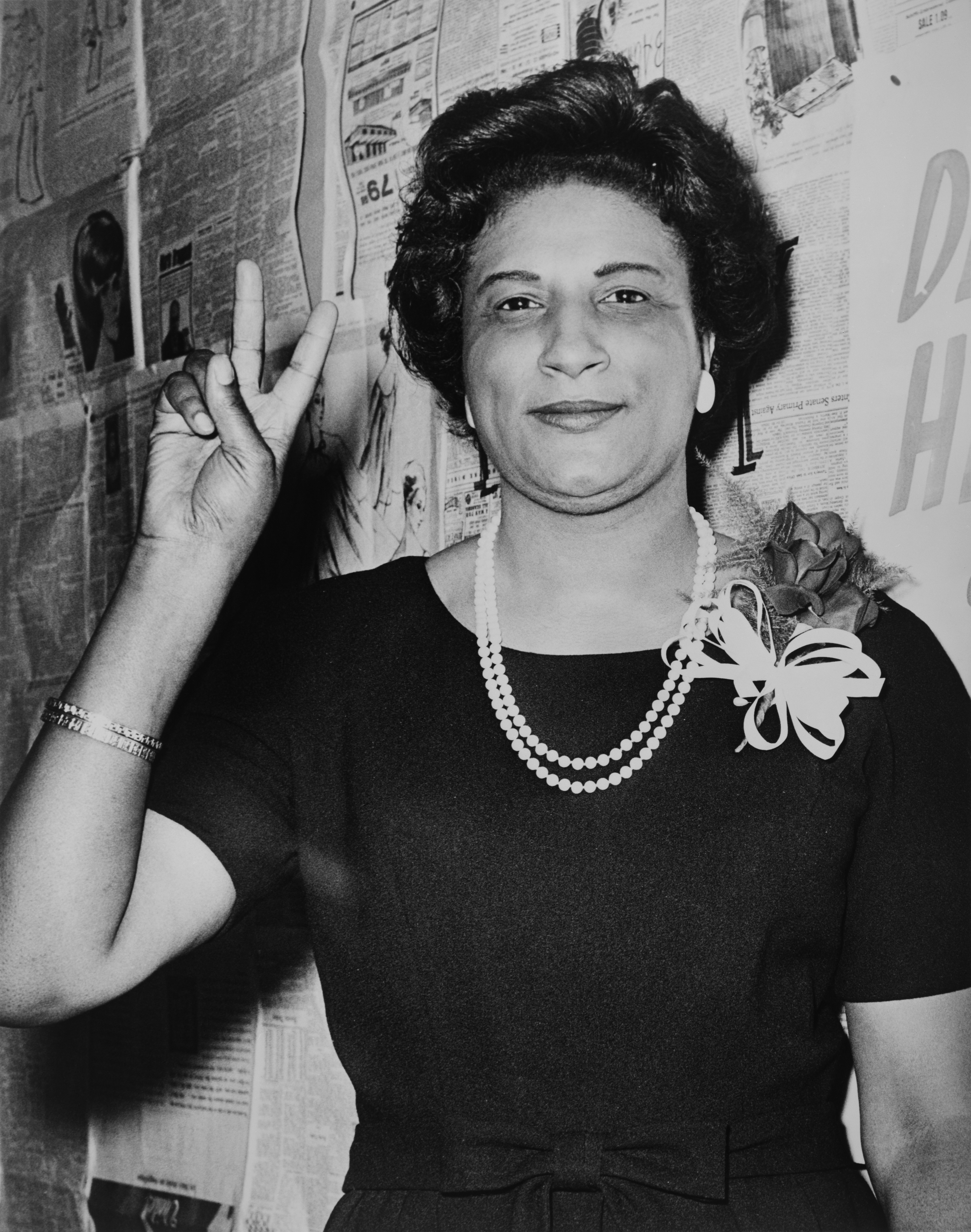
Constance Baker Motley

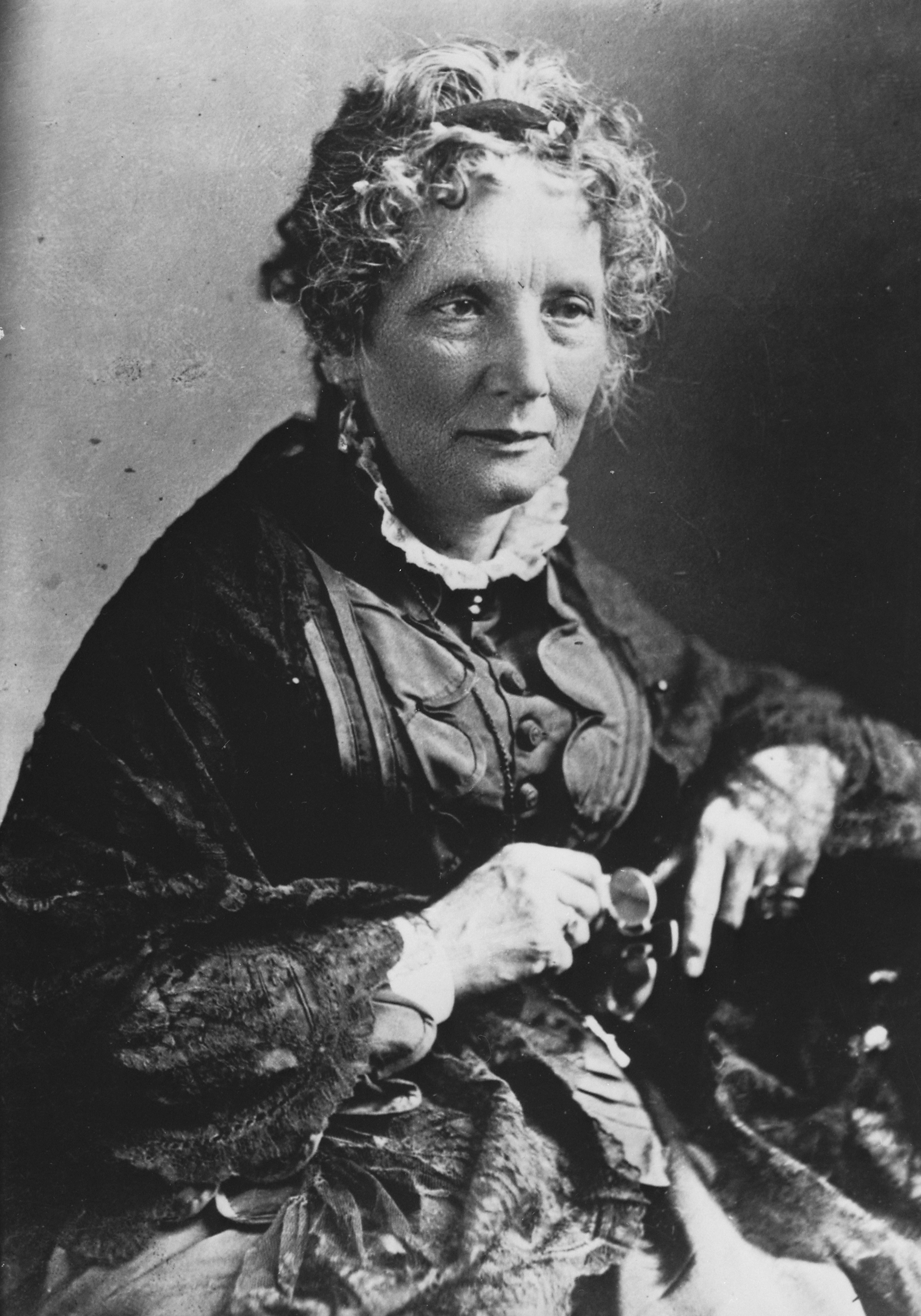
Harriet Beecher Stowe

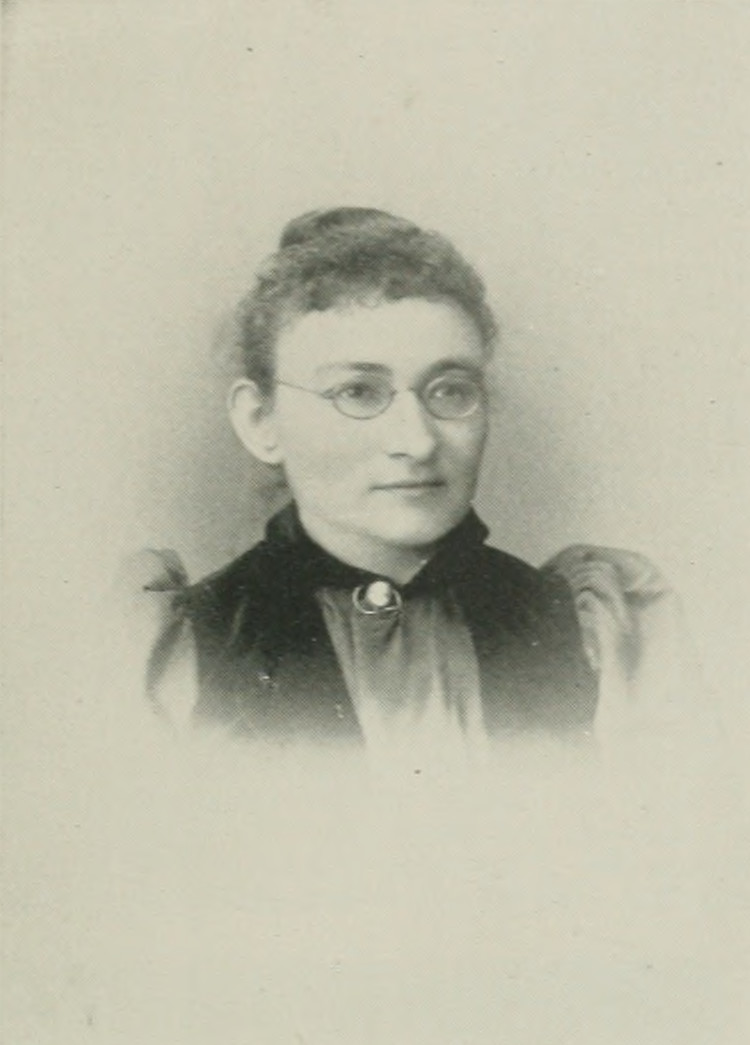
Ada Josephine Todd

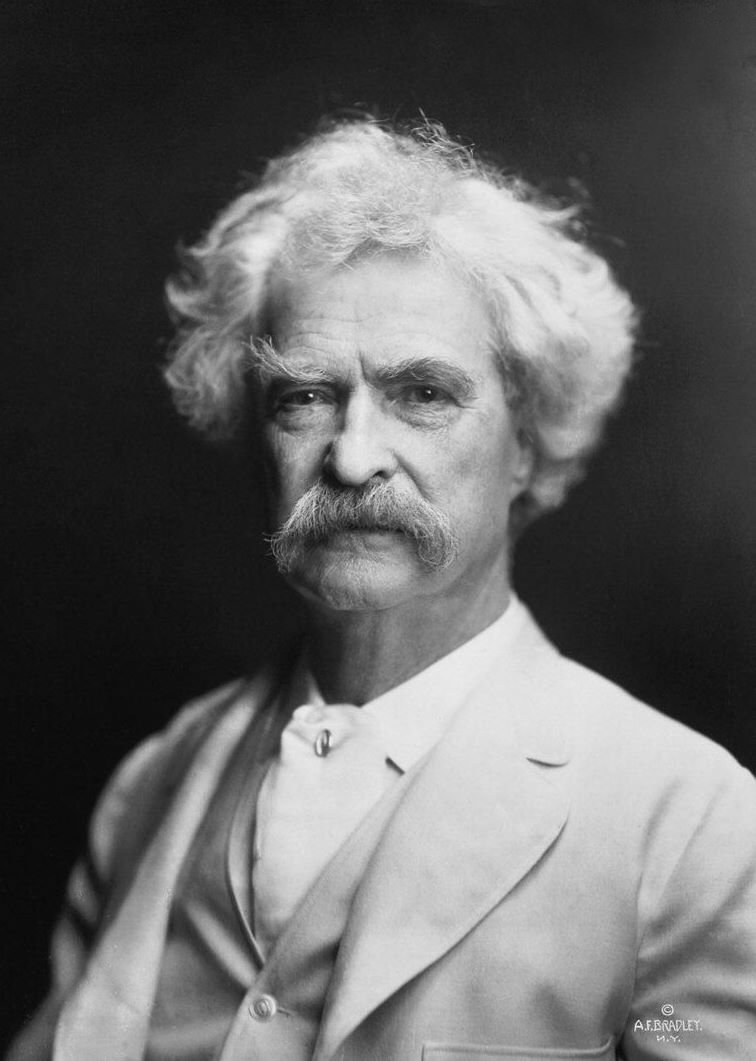
Mark Twain

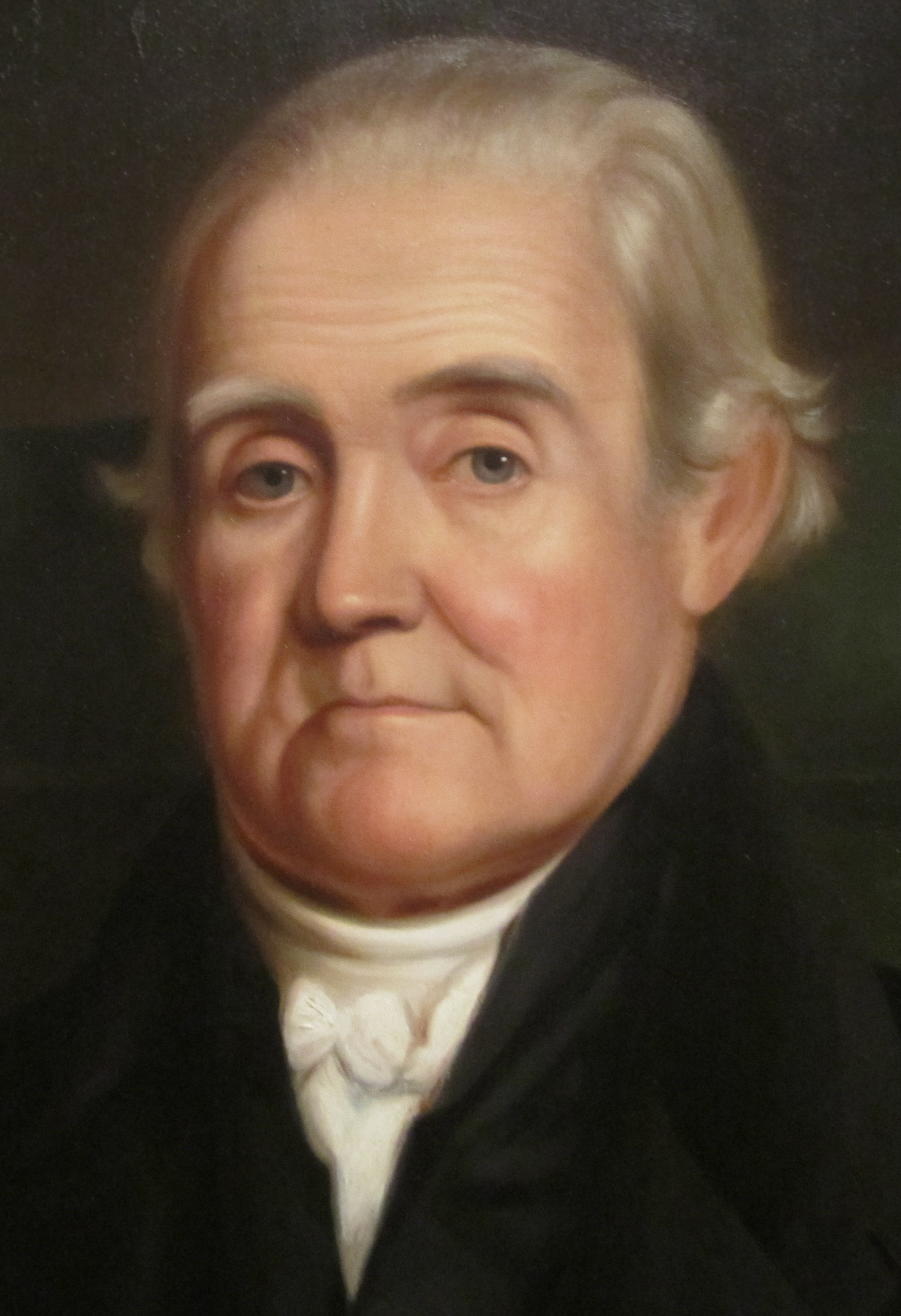
Noah Webster

- Christopher Andersen (Washington)
- Jacob M. Appel (Branford)
- Harriet Pritchard Arnold (Killingly)
- Rosecrans Baldwin (Darien)
- Edward C. Banfield (Bloomfield)
- Joel Barlow (Redding)
- Dan Beard (Redding)
- A. Scott Berg (Norwalk)
- Mary C. Billings (Litchfield)
- Joseph Payne Brennan (Bridgeport and New Haven)
- Thom Brooks (Guilford)
- Emily S. Bouton (New Canaan)
- William F. Buckley Jr. (New York City and Stamford)
- Candace Bushnell (Glastonbury)
- Guido Calabresi (New Haven)
- Al Capp (New Haven)
- Marietta Stanley Case (Thompson)
- Frances Manwaring Caulkins (New London)
- Noah Charney (New Haven)
- Lincoln Child (Westport)
- Emma Shaw Colcleugh (Thompson)
- Christopher Collier (Orange)
- Suzanne Collins (Hartford and Newtown)
- Kate Cordsen (Essex)
- Nathan Daboll (Groton)
- Mary Ann H. Dodd (Hartford)
- Clay Dreslough (Ashford)
- John Gregory Dunne (Hartford)
- Addie C. Strong Engle (Manchester)
- Eleanor Estes (West Haven)
- Mallory Factor (Bridgeport)
- Howard Fast (Redding)
- Harriet Ford (Seymour)
- Edward Miner Gallaudet (Hartford)
- Elizabeth Gilbert (Waterbury)
- Charlotte Perkins Gilman (Hartford)
- Daniel Coit Gilman (Norwich)
- Thyrza Nichols Goodeve (Middlebury)
- Hanna Holborn Gray (New Haven)
- Kate E. Griswold (West Hartford)
- Anna Huntington (Bethel)
- Chauncey Ives (Hamden)
- Anna Louise James (Hartford and (Old Saybrook)
- Klaus Janson (Bridgeport)
- Deane Keller (New Haven)
- John Frederick Kensett (Cheshire)
- Charles H. Kraft (Waterbury)
- Larry Kramer (Bridgeport)
- Madeleine L'Engle (Goshen)
- Loosey LaDuca (Ansonia)
- Wally Lamb (Mansfield)
- Annie Leibovitz (Waterbury)
- Robert Ludlum (Southport)
- Ira Levin (Wilton)
- Sol LeWitt (Hartford)
- Frank Luntz (West Hartford)
- Elizabeth Eunice Smith Marcy (East Hampton)
- E. Louisa Mather (East Haddam)
- Jay McInerney (Hartford)
- Eric Metaxas (Danbury)
- Stephenie Meyer (Hartford)
- Arthur Miller (Roxbury)
- Constance Baker Motley (New Haven)
- Emily Cheney Neville (Manchester)
- Flannery O'Connor (Redding)
- John Pekkanen (Lyme)
- Derek Pell (Weston)
- Jacques Pepin (Madison)
- Ann Petry (Old Saybrook)
- Sarah Phillips (Wilton)
- Kenneth Pike (Woodstock)
- Charles Ethan Porter (Hartford)
- Delia Lyman Porter (New Haven)
- Frederick Pratson (Hartford)
- Annie Proulx (Norwich)
- Luanne Rice (New Britain)
- Mary A. Ripley (Windham)
- Bill Roorbach (New Canaan)
- Christopher Ross (Westport)
- Philip Roth (Warren)
- Acharya S (Avon)
- Vincent Scully (New Haven)
- George Selden (Hartford)
- Richard Selzer (North Branford)
- Maurice Sendak (Ridgefield)
- Mark Shasha (New London)
- Lurana W. Sheldon (Hadlyme)
- Lydia Sigourney (Hartford)
- T. O'Conor Sloane Jr. (Westport)
- T. O'Conor Sloane III (Westport)
- Dorothy Hope Smith (Westport)
- Sarah Lanman Smith (Norwich)
- Victoria Leigh Soto (Bridgeport)
- Armstrong Sperry (Stamford, New Canaan, and New Haven)
- Benjamin Spock (New Haven)
- Edward Steichen (Redding)
- Wallace Stevens (Hartford)
- Lavinia Stoddard (Guilford)
- Roger Stone (Norwalk)
- Harriet Beecher Stowe (Litchfield)
- Arthur Szyk (New Canaan)
- Sarah Katherine Taylor (Danielsonville)
- Laura M. Thurston (Norfolk)
- Alton Tobey (Middletown)
- Ada Josephine Todd (Redding)
- Sergio Troncoso (Kent)
- Garry Trudeau (Branford)
- Louisa Caroline Tuthill (New Haven)
- Mark Twain (Hartford and Redding)
- Mary E. Van Lennep (Hartford)
- Ocean Vuong (Hartford)
- Edward Lewis Wallant (New Haven)
- Noah Webster (West Hartford parish, presently West Hartford)
- J. Alden Weir (Ridgefield)
- Abigail Goodrich Whittelsey (Ridgefield)
- Walter Wick (Hartford)

== Business people, scientists, and inventors ==
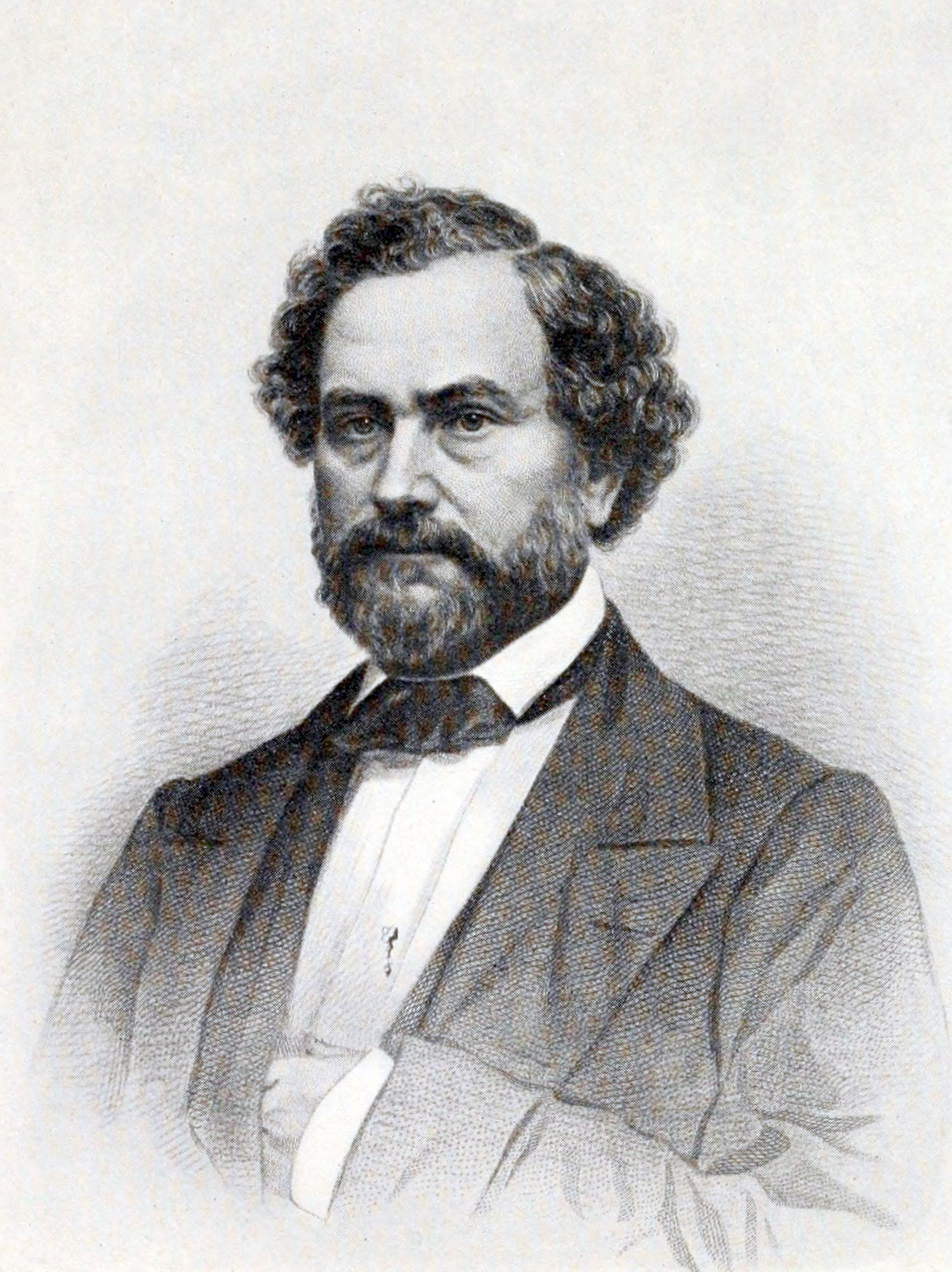
Samuel Colt

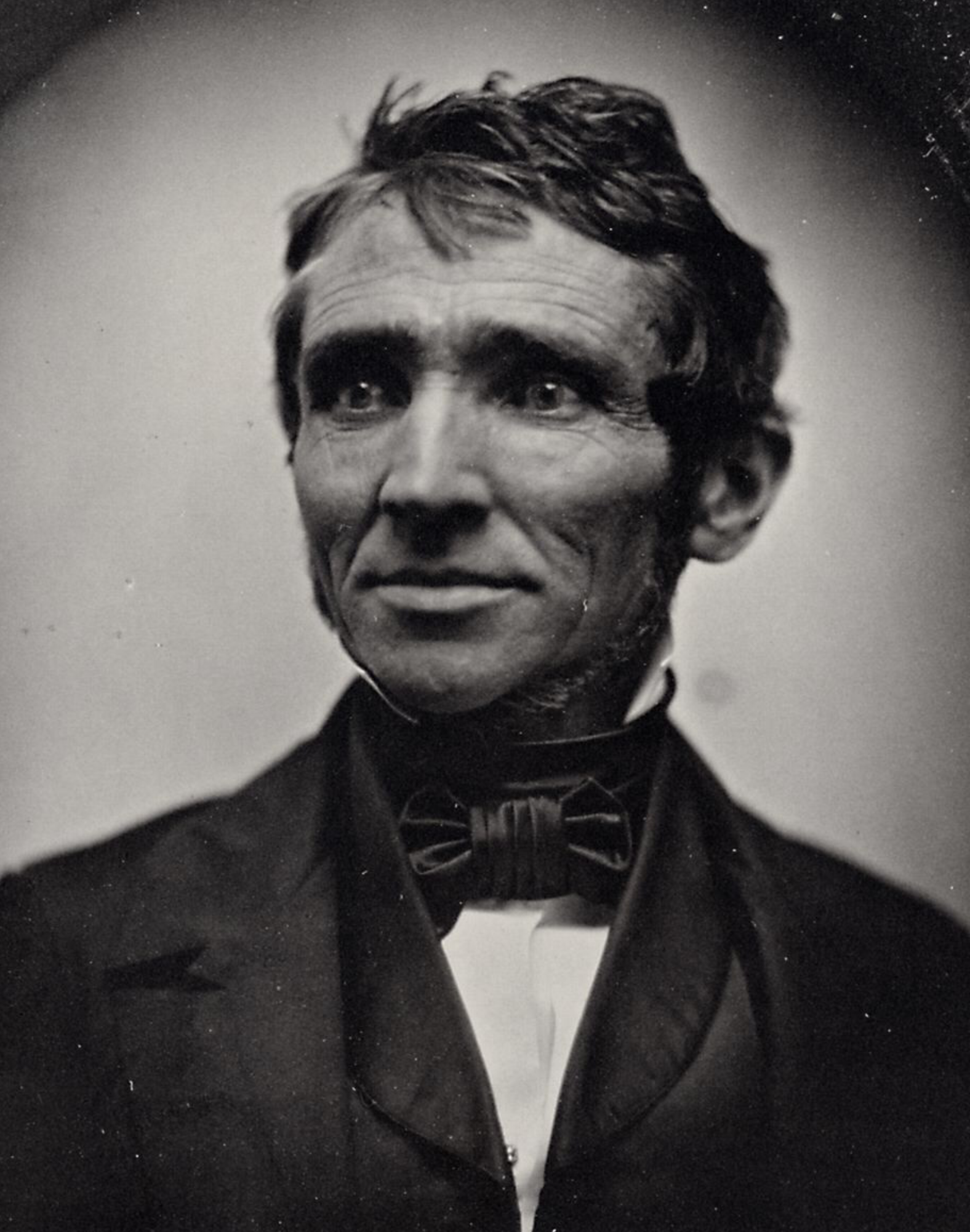
Charles Goodyear

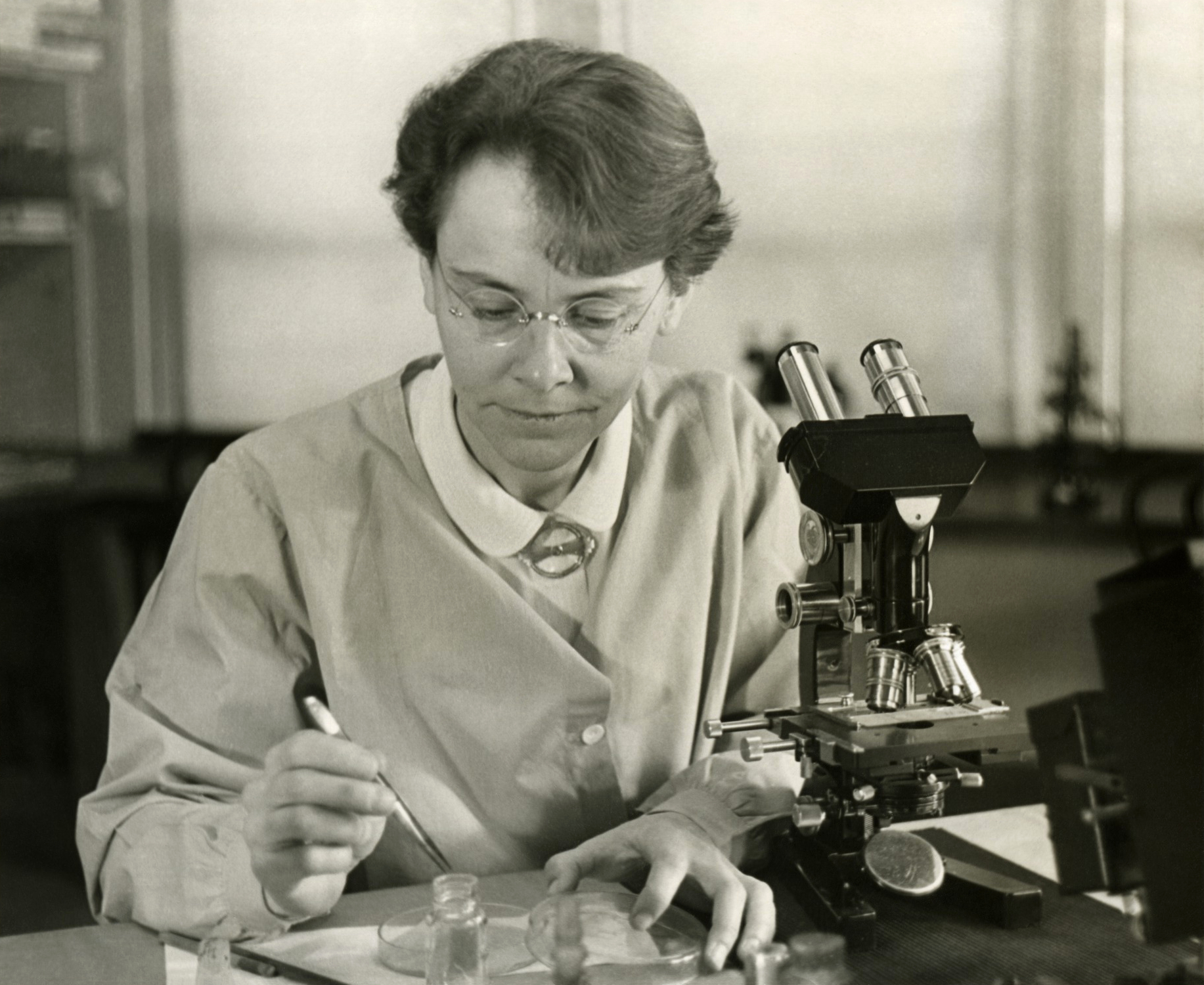
Barbara McClintock

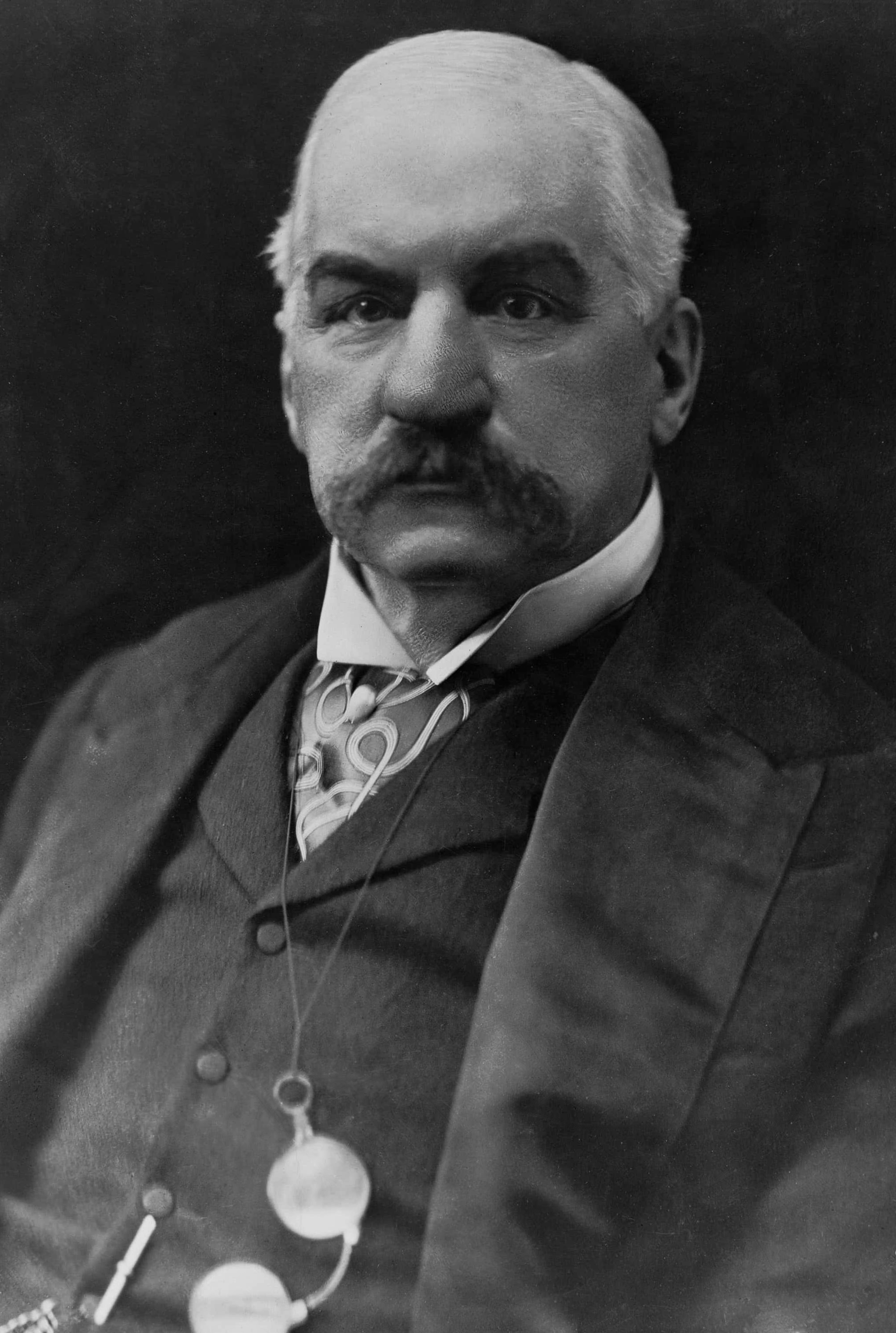
J.P. Morgan

- George Akerlof (New Haven)
- Moses Austin (Durham)
- Edward C. Banfield (Bloomfield)
- P.T. Barnum (Bethel and Bridgeport)
- William Beaumont (Lebanon)
- Linda Behnken
- John Bello (Plainville)
- Henry Alfred Bishop (Bridgeport)
- Cornelius Scranton Bushnell (Madison)
- David Bushnell (Saybrook)
- Vint Cerf (New Haven)
- Wesley A. Clark (New Haven)
- Kenton Clarke (Fairfield)
- Jared Cohen (Weston)
- Samuel Colt (Hartford)
- Carol Lynn Curchoe (Manchester)
- Ray Dalio (Greenwich/Westport)
- Bern Dibner (Wilton)
- Robert Epstein (Hartford)
- James Farrell (New Haven)
- John Fitch (Hartford County)
- Anselm Franz (Stratford)
- Josiah Willard Gibbs (New Haven)
- Alfred G. Gilman (New Haven)
- Charles Goodyear (New Haven)
- James J. Greco (Hamden)
- Robert N. Hall (New Haven)
- Louis Harris (New Haven)
- Arthur William Haydon (Waterbury)
- Allan Hobson (Hartford)
- Harvey Hubbell (Bridgeport)
- Collis Potter Huntington (Harwinton)
- James M. Hyde (Mystic Bridge)
- Jeffrey R. Immelt (New Canaan)
- Betsey Johnson (Wethersfield)
- Alfred Winslow Jones (Redding)
- Edward Calvin Kendall (South Norwalk)
- Mary Dixon Kies (South Killingly)
- George E. Kimball (New Britain)
- Stephen Cole Kleene (Hartford)
- Edwin H. Land (Bridgeport)
- Henry Lee (Orange)
- Albert L. Lehninger (Bridgeport)
- Allen Cleveland Lewis (Sterling)
- Alvin Liberman (Mansfield)
- Saunders Mac Lane (Taftville)
- John C. Malone (Milford)
- John Martin (Old Lyme)
- Barbara McClintock (Hartford)
- Stephanie McMahon (Hartford)
- Sean McManus (Fairfield)
- Daniel J. Mitchell (Wilton)
- Samuel Augustus Mitchell (Bristol)
- Samuel Morey (Hebron)
- J. P. Morgan (Hartford)
- Roy Neuberger (Bridgeport)
- Victor Niederhoffer (Weston)
- Frederick Law Olmsted (Hartford)
- Ken Olsen (Stratford)
- Eliphalet Remington (Suffield)
- Stephen S. Roach (New Canaan)
- Amir Satvat (Farmington)
- Peter Schiff (New Haven)
- Joseph Earl Sheffield (Southport)
- Igor Sikorsky (Stratford, Trumbull and Easton)
- Benjamin Silliman (Trumbull and New Haven)
- Chip Skowron (Greenwich)
- Alfred P. Sloan (New Haven)
- George Smith (Norwalk)
- Christopher Spencer (Manchester)
- Roger Wolcott Sperry (Hartford)
- Frank J. Sprague (Milford)
- Frederick Stanley (New Britain)
- John William Sterling (Stratford)
- Martha Stewart (Westport)
- Francis Sumner (Pomfret)
- Eli Terry (East Windsor)
- Seth Thomas (Wolcott)
- Whitney Tilson
- John Hasbrouck Van Vleck (Middletown)
- William H. Welch (Norfolk)
- Warren L. Wheaton (Pomfret)
- Nathaniel Wheeler (Bridgeport)
- Dana White (Manchester)
- Gustave Whitehead (Bridgeport)
- Eli Whitney (New Haven)
- Oliver Fisher Winchester (New Haven)
- Arthur Williams Wright (Lebanon)
- Robert Charles Wright (Southport)
- Steve Wynn (New Haven)

== Journalists and commentators ==
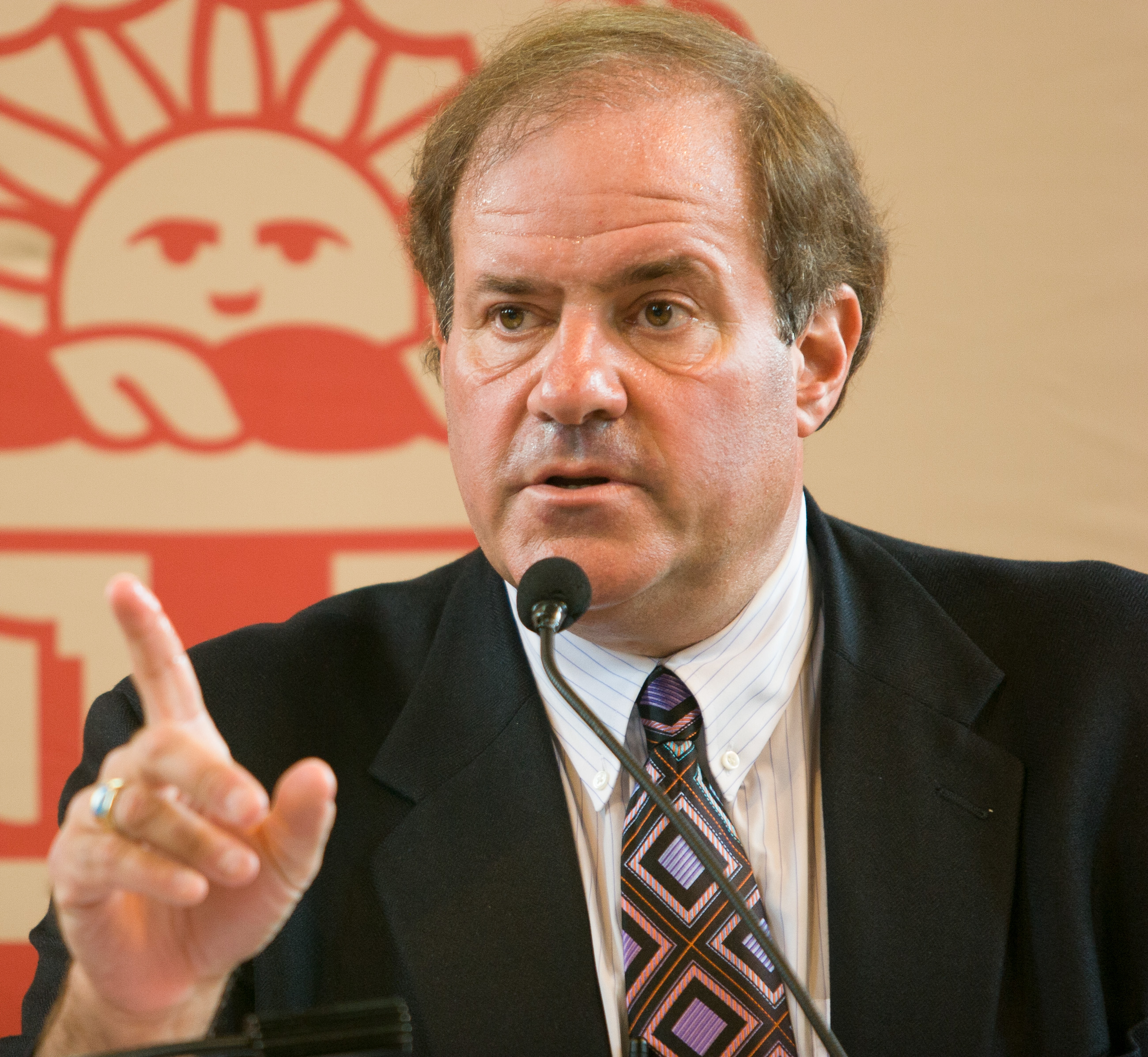
Chris Berman

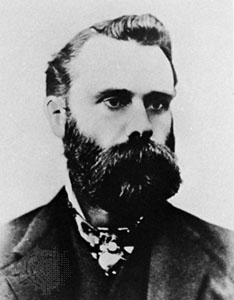
Charles Dow

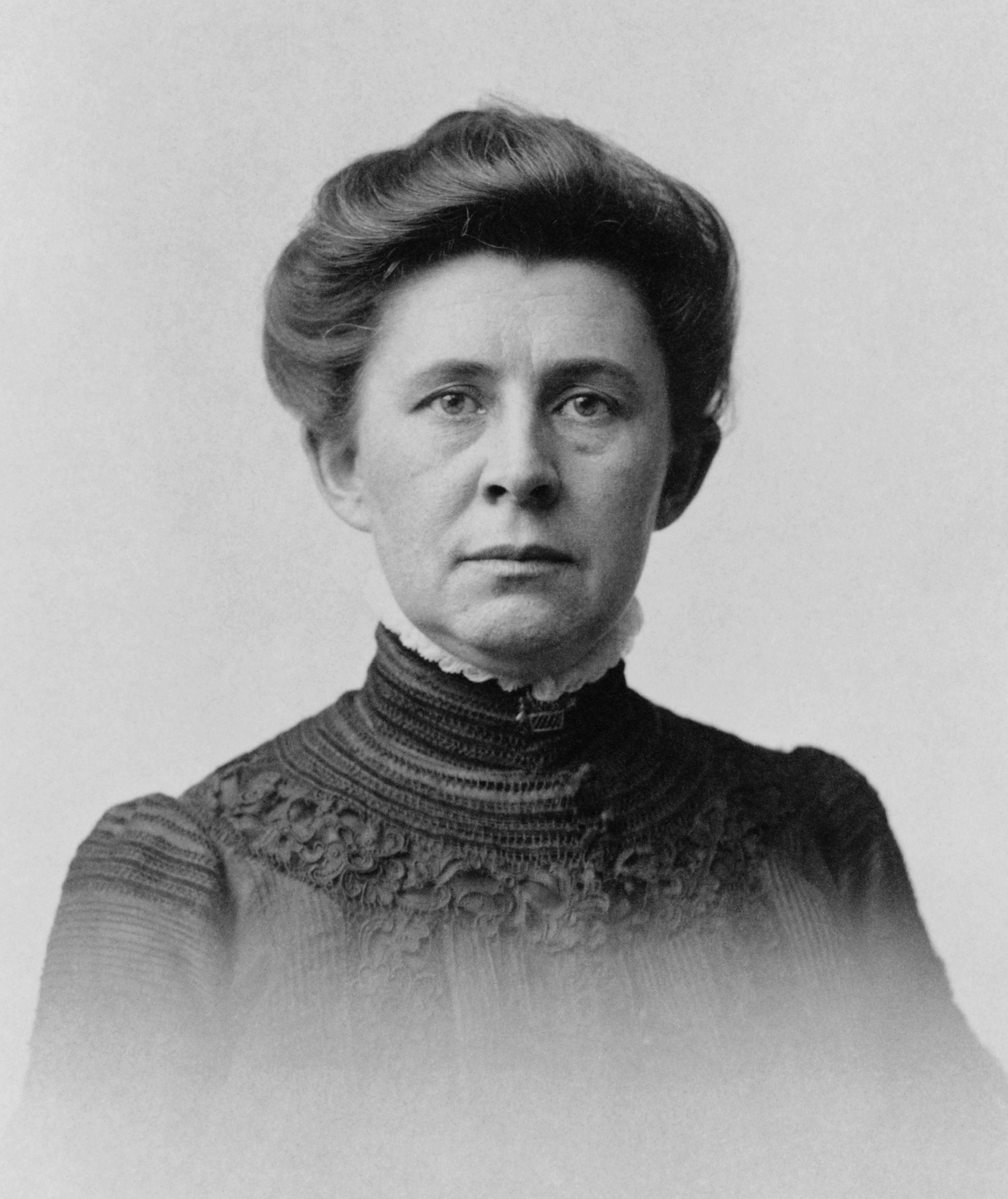
Ida Tarbell

- Joseph Alsop (Avon)
- Stewart Alsop (Avon)
- Julie Banderas (Hartford)
- Wayne Barrett (New Britain)
- Chris Berman (Greenwich and Cheshire)
- Thom Brooks (Guilford)
- Chris Cillizza (Marlborough)
- Rita Cosby (Greenwich)
- Ann Coulter (New Canaan)
- Ross Douthat (New Haven)
- Charles Dow (Sterling)
- Dick Ebersol (Torrington)
- Kelly Evans (Hartford)
- Frank Fixaris (Torrington)
- Brendan Gill (Hartford)
- Linda Greenhouse (Hamden)
- Burton J. Hendrick (New Haven)
- Don Imus (Westport)
- Laura Ingraham (Glastonbury)
- Larry Kudlow (Redding)
- Kenny Mayne (Bethel)
- Leigh Montville (New Haven)
- Dick Morris (Redding)
- Tim Murnane (Naugatuck)
- Candace Owens (Stamford)
- Dan Patrick (Milford)
- Steve Phillips (Wilton)
- Molly Qerim (New Haven)
- Lonnie Quinn (Cheshire)
- Joan Rivers (New Milford)
- Andy Rooney (Norwalk)
- David Sirota (New Haven)
- James Surowiecki (Meriden)
- Ida Tarbell (Easton)
- Sabrina Tavernise (Hartford)
- Liz Trotta (New Haven)
- Trey Wingo (Greenwich)
- Sid Yudain (New Canaan)

== Military figures ==
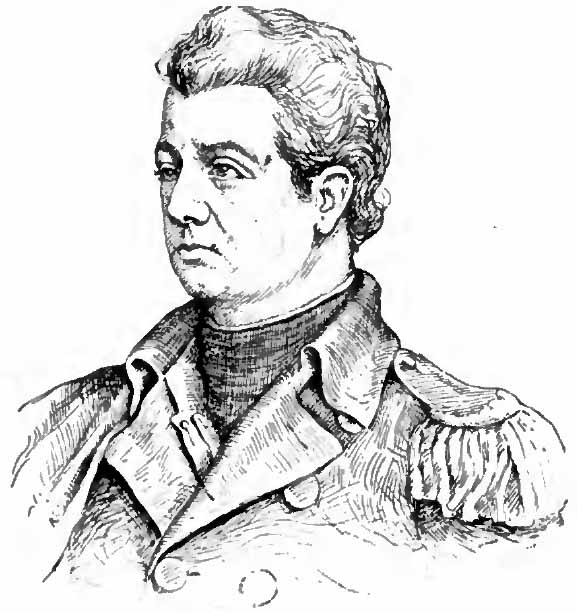
Ethan Allen

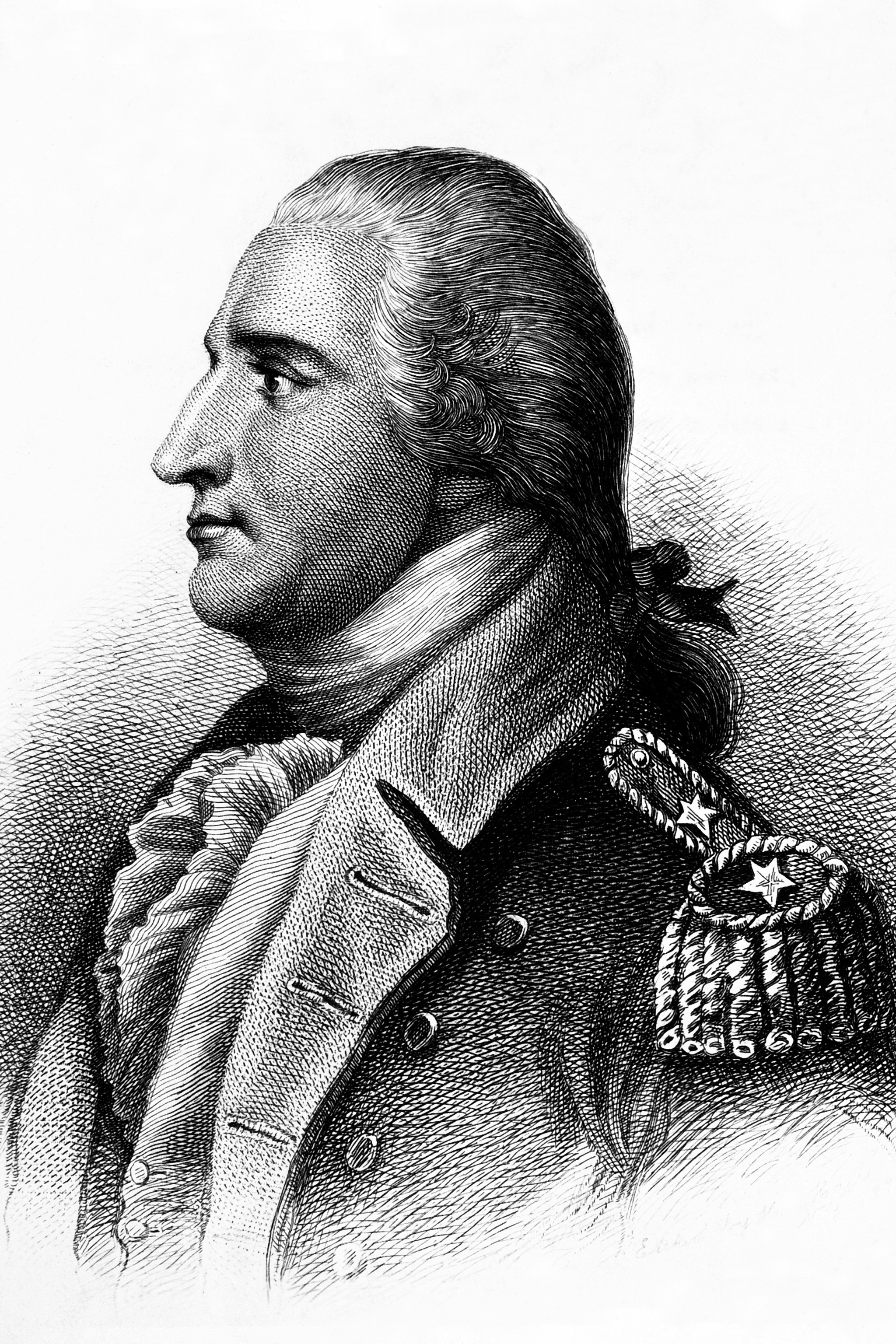
Benedict Arnold

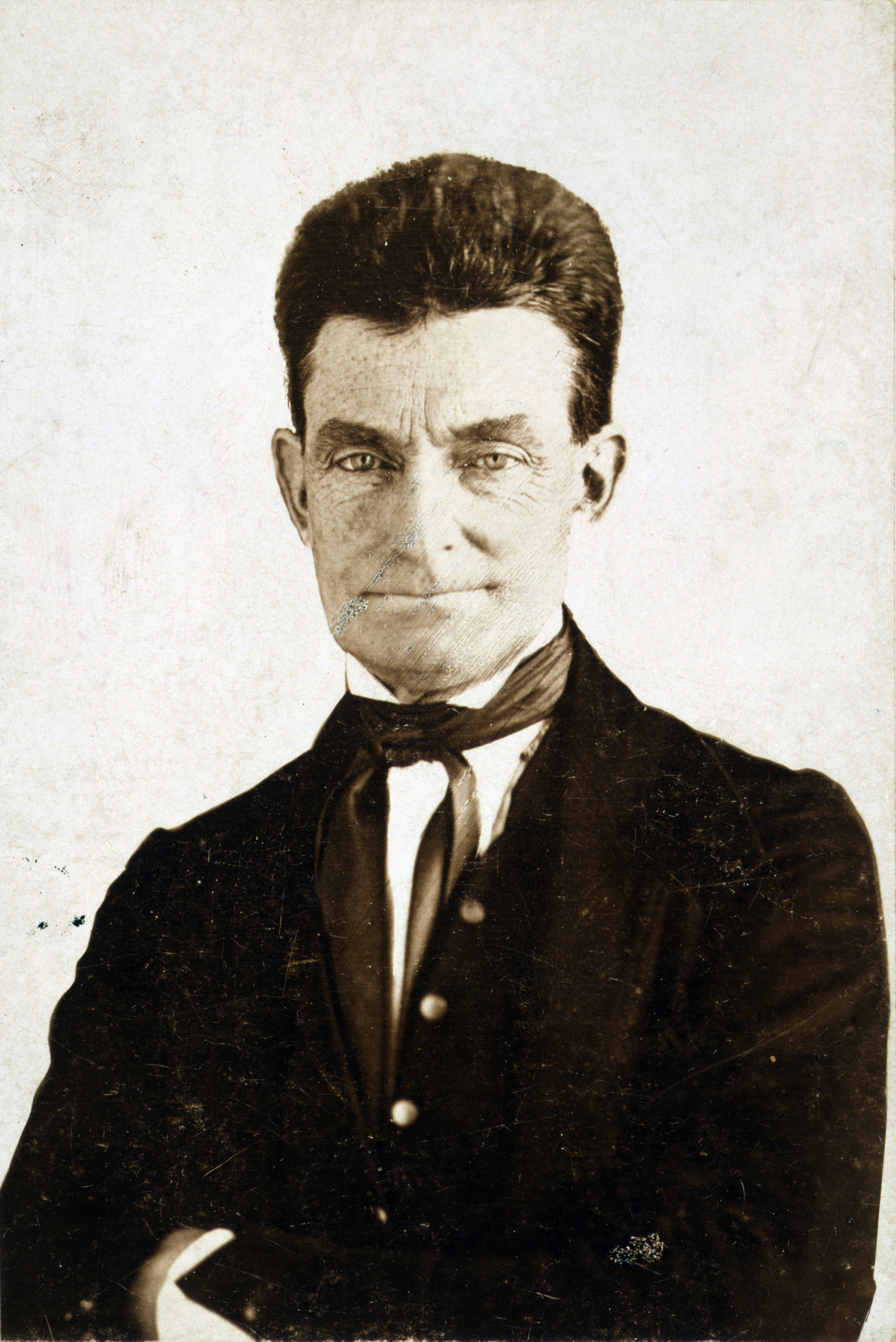
John Brown

- Timothy I. Ahern (New Haven)
- Ethan Allen (Litchfield)
- Benedict Arnold (Norwich)
- Daniel Bissell (East Windsor)
- John Brown (Torrington)
- Thomas L. Brown II (Danbury)
- Daniel C. Burbank (Manchester)
- John Butler (New London)
- Tedford H. Cann (Bridgeport)
- Benjamin Delahauf Foulois (Washington)
- Walter S. Gorka (Windsor Locks)
- Nathan Hale (Coventry)
- David Hawley (Bridgeport)
- Isaac Hull (Derby)
- David Humphreys (Derby)
- Raymond Jacobs (Bridgeport)
- Everett F. Larson (Stamford)
- Ezra Lee (Lyme)
- John Levitow (Hartford)
- Alfred Judson Force Moody (New Haven)
- Henry A. Mucci (Bridgeport)
- Robert J. Papp Jr. (Norwich)
- Samuel Holden Parsons (Lyme)
- Israel Putnam (Brooklyn)
- Gold Selleck Silliman (Fairfield)
- Robert Stethem (Waterbury)
- Benjamin Tallmadge (Litchfield)
- John Trumbull (Lebanon)
- James Wadsworth (Durham)
- Philip C. Wehle (Westport)
- Irving Wiltsie (Hartford)
- David Wooster (Stratford)

== Musicians, singers, and composers ==
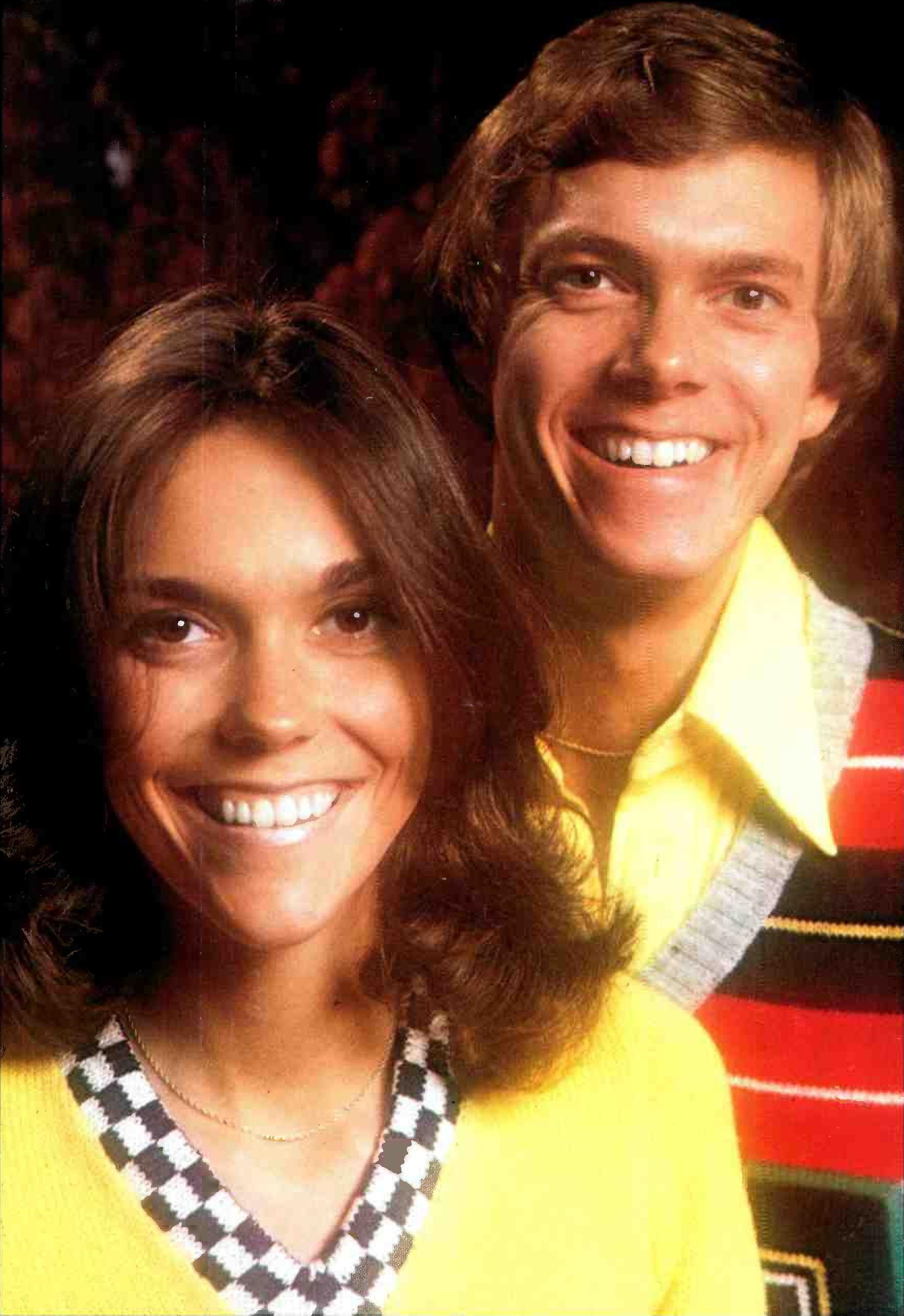
The Carpenters

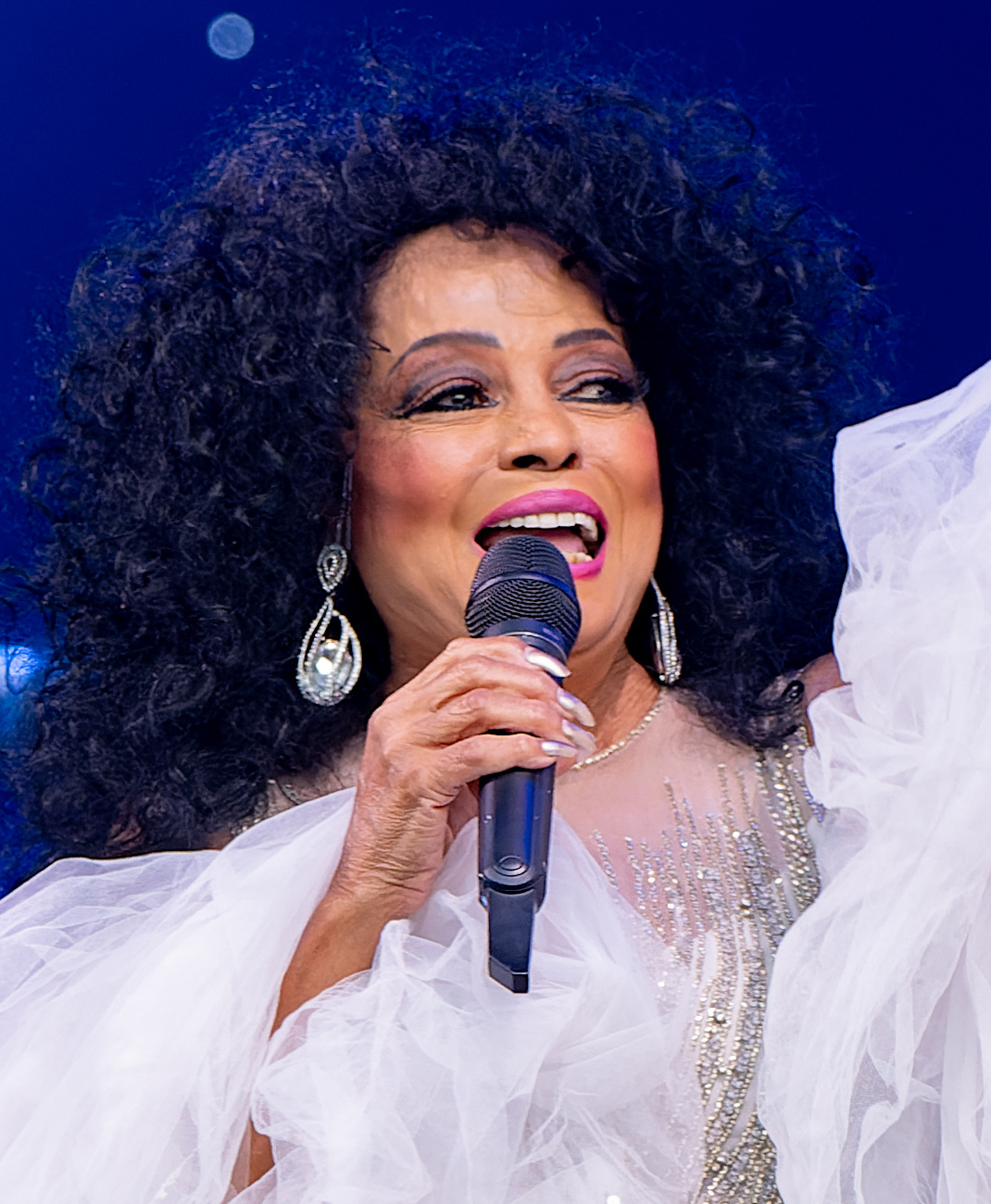
Diana Ross

- Marian Anderson (Danbury)
- Apathy (Willimantic)
- Timothy Archambault (Willimantic)
- Veronica Ballestrini (Waterford)
- Mark Berman (New Haven)
- Kath Bloom (New Haven)
- Michael Bolton (New Haven)
- Dave Brubeck (Wilton)
- Igor Buketoff (Hartford)
- Gary Burr (Meriden)
- Ray Cappo (Danbury)
- Karen Carpenter (New Haven)
- Richard Carpenter (New Haven)
- Chris Carrabba (West Hartford)
- Javier Colon (Stratford)
- Rivers Cuomo (Storrs)
- Julia DeMato (Brookfield)
- Dirt E. Dutch (Danbury)
- José Feliciano (Westport)
- Joe Flood (Portland)
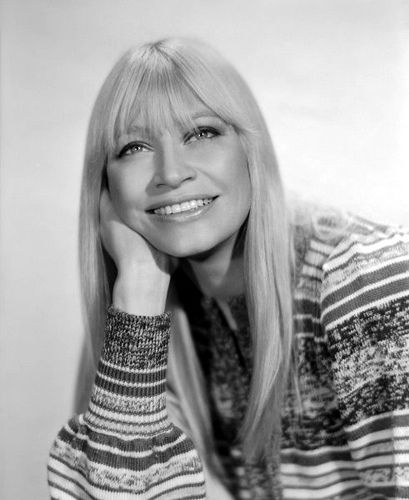
  Mary Travers
- Nick Fradiani (Guilford)
- Chris Frantz (Fairfield)
- Sawyer Fredericks (Newtown)
- Stan Freeman (Waterbury)
- Daryl Hall (Redding)
- Hatebreed (Bridgeport)
- Jascha Heifetz (Redding)
- Grayson Hugh (Danbury)
- Charles Ives (Danbury)
- Bernard Jackson (Stamford)
- Ben Kopec (Derby)
- Meat Loaf (Redding)
- John Mayer (Fairfield)
- Peter McCann (Bridgeport)
- Mark McGrath (Hartford)
- Dom McLennon (Hartford)
- Brad Mehldau (West Hartford)
- Syesha Mercado (Bridgeport)
- Moby (Darien)
- Jimmy Monaghan (Danbury)
- Thurston Moore (Bethel)
- Alfred Newman (New Haven)
- Liz Phair (New Haven)
- Gene Pitney (Hartford)
- Keith Richards (Weston)
- Dawn Robinson (New London)
- Nile Rodgers (Westport)
- Diana Ross (Greenwich)
- Emily Saliers (New Haven)
- John Scofield (Wilton)
- Horace Silver (Norwalk)
- Ronnie Spector (Brookfield)
- Steve Stevens (Hartford)
- Seth Swirsky (New Haven)
- Mary Travers (Redding)
- Carter Vail (Wilton)
- Cassie Ventura (New London)
- Franco Ventriglia (Fairfield)
- Vinnie Vincent (Bridgeport)
- Chris Webby (Norwalk)
- Tina Weymouth (Fairfield)
- Brian Yale (Orange)

== Politicians and statesmen ==
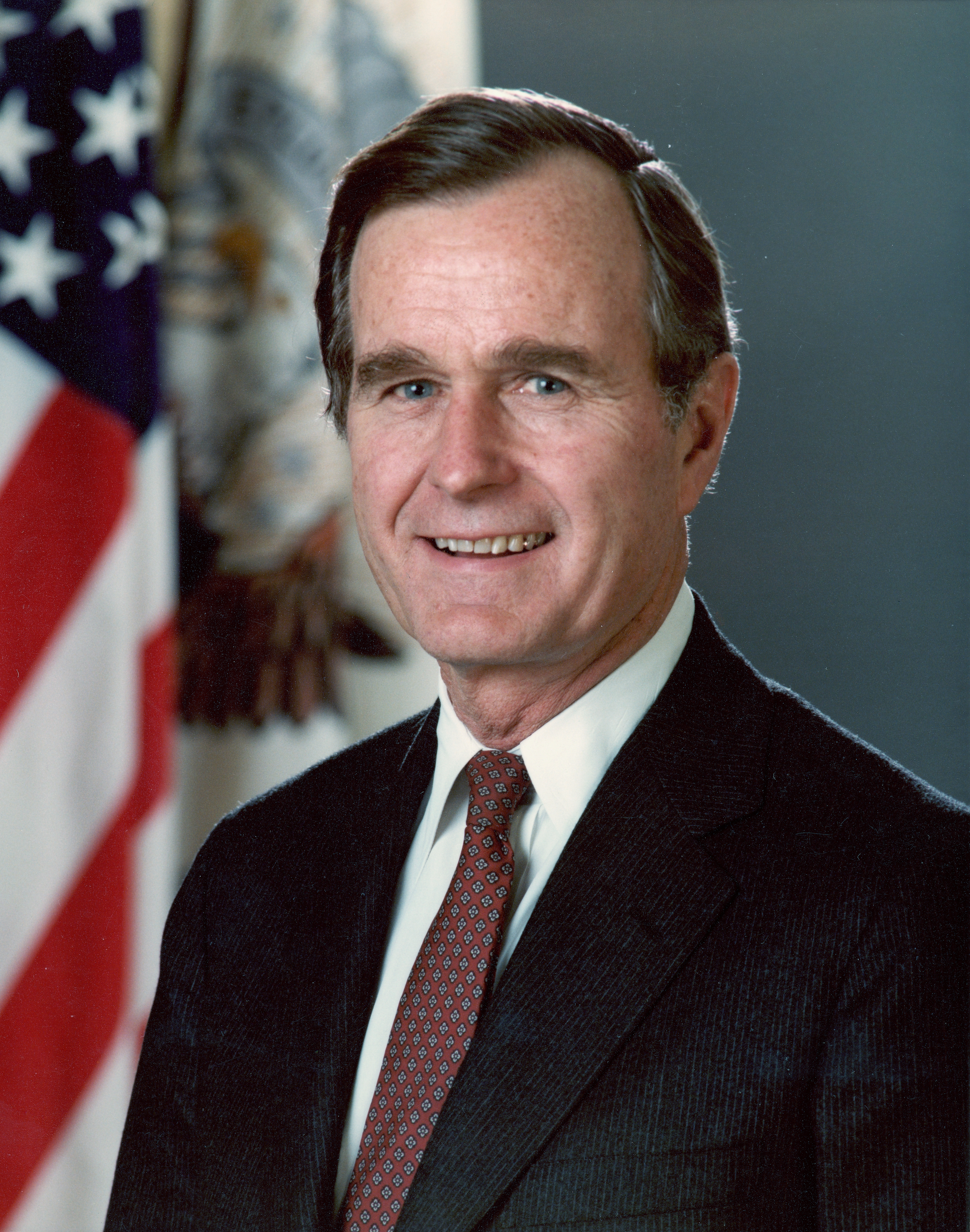
George H. W. Bush

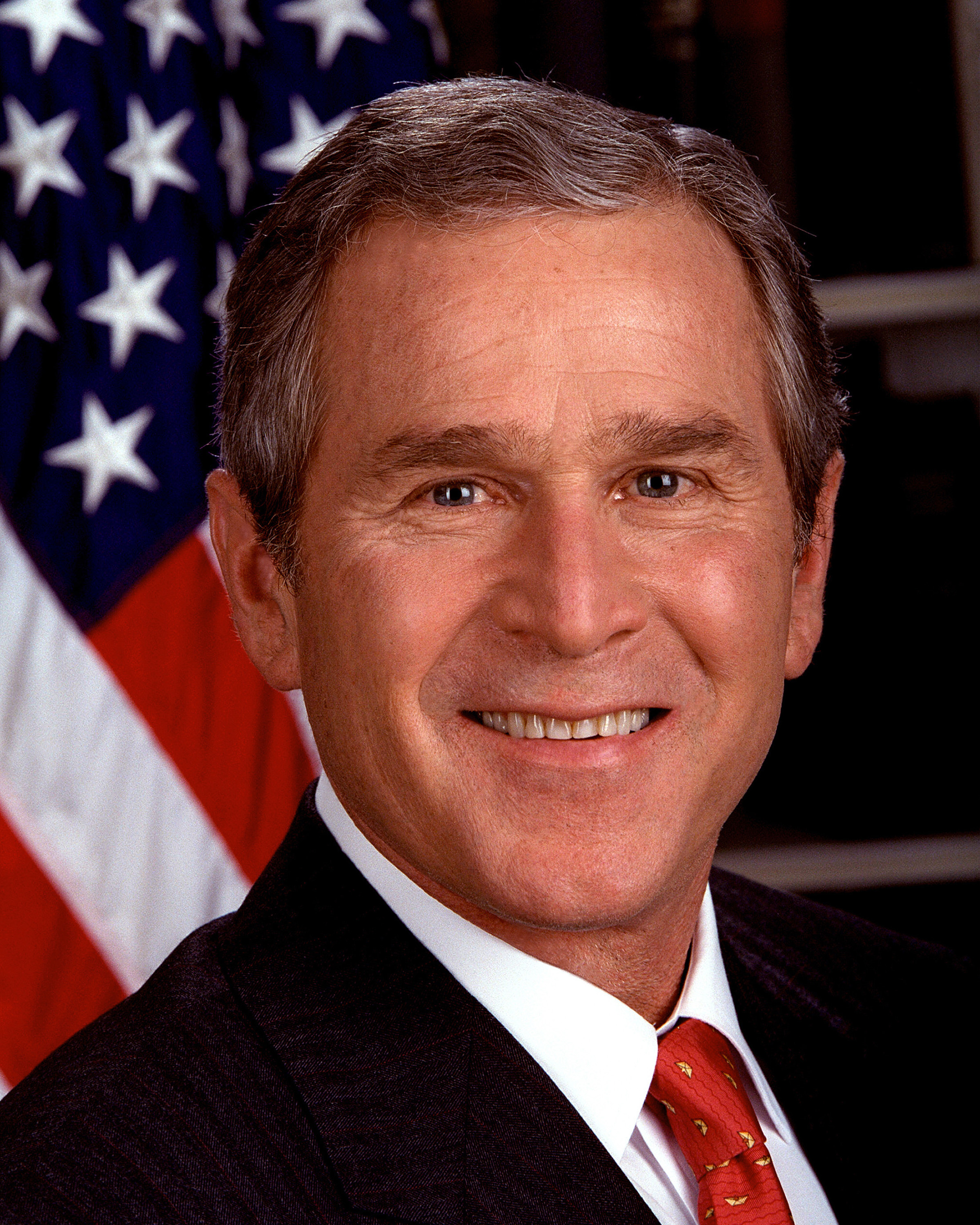
George W. Bush

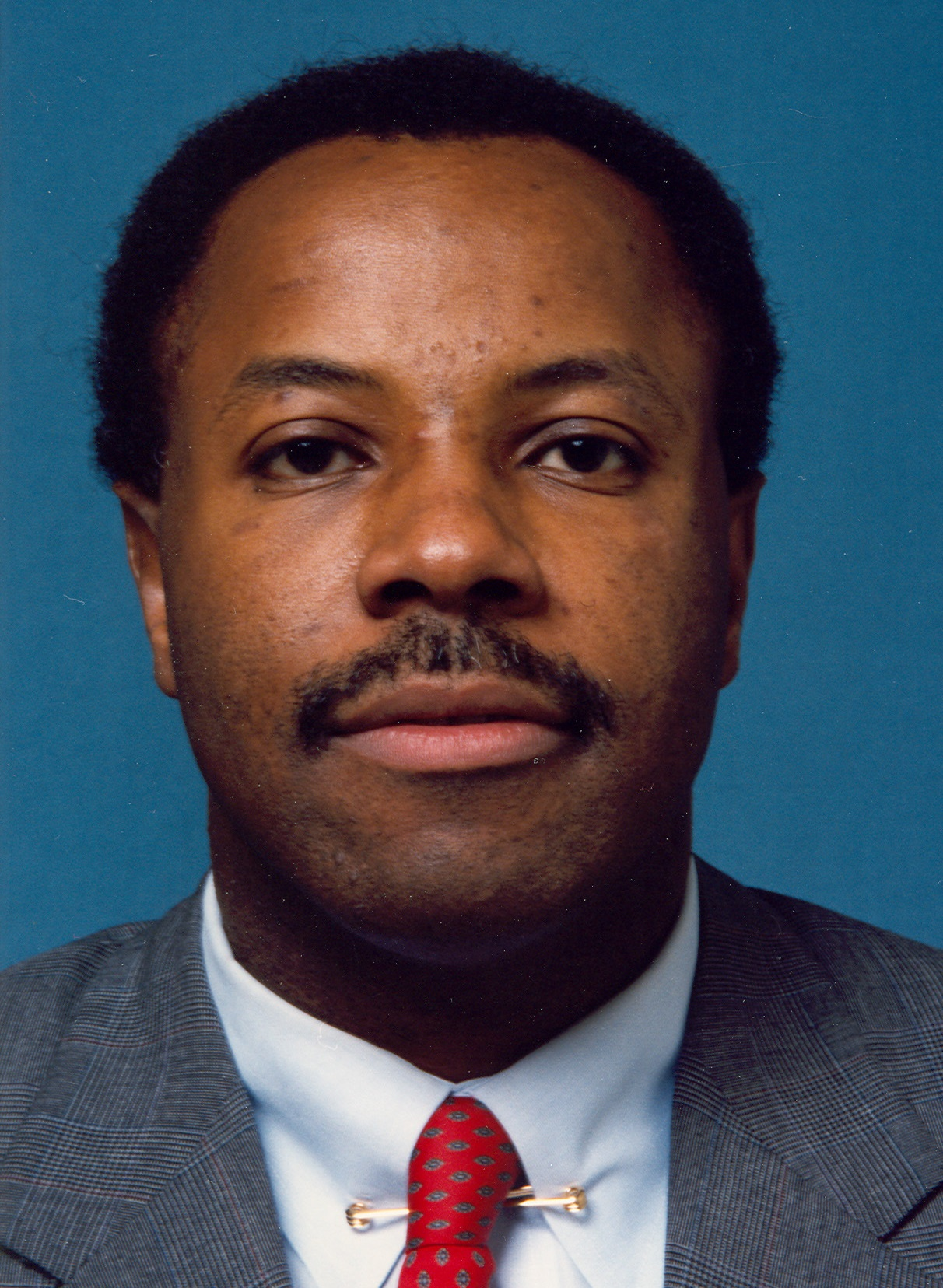
Gary Franks

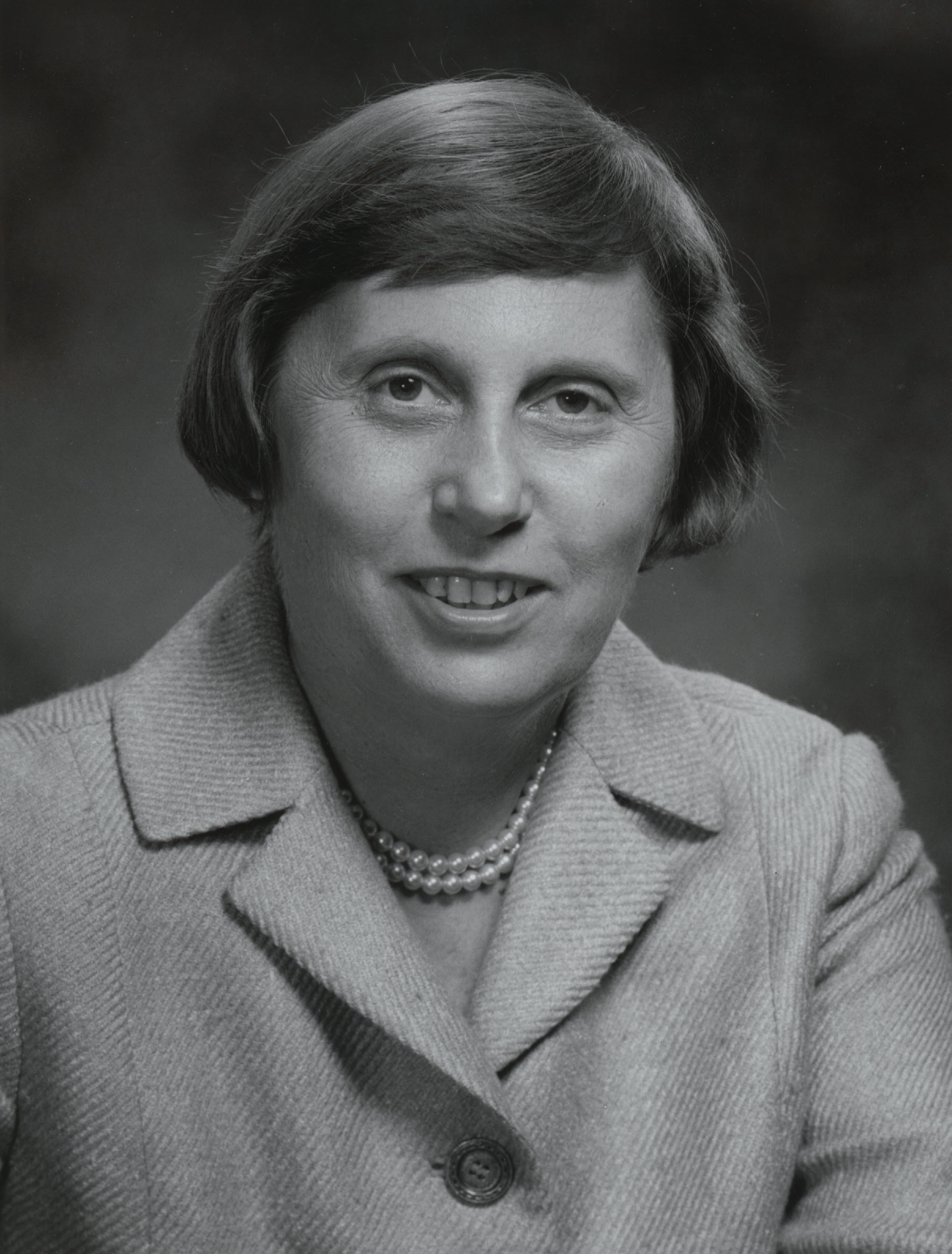
Ella Grasso

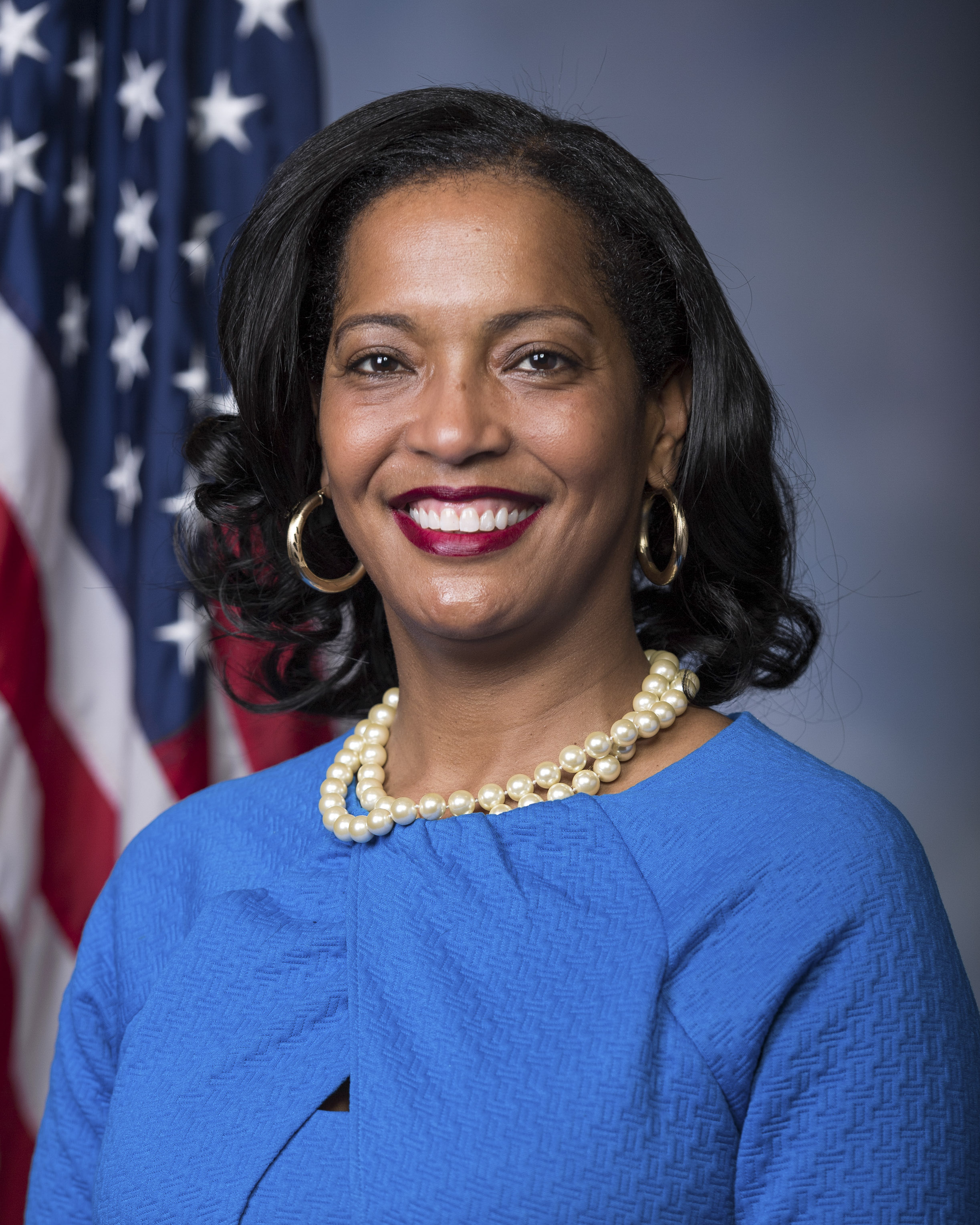
Jahana Hayes

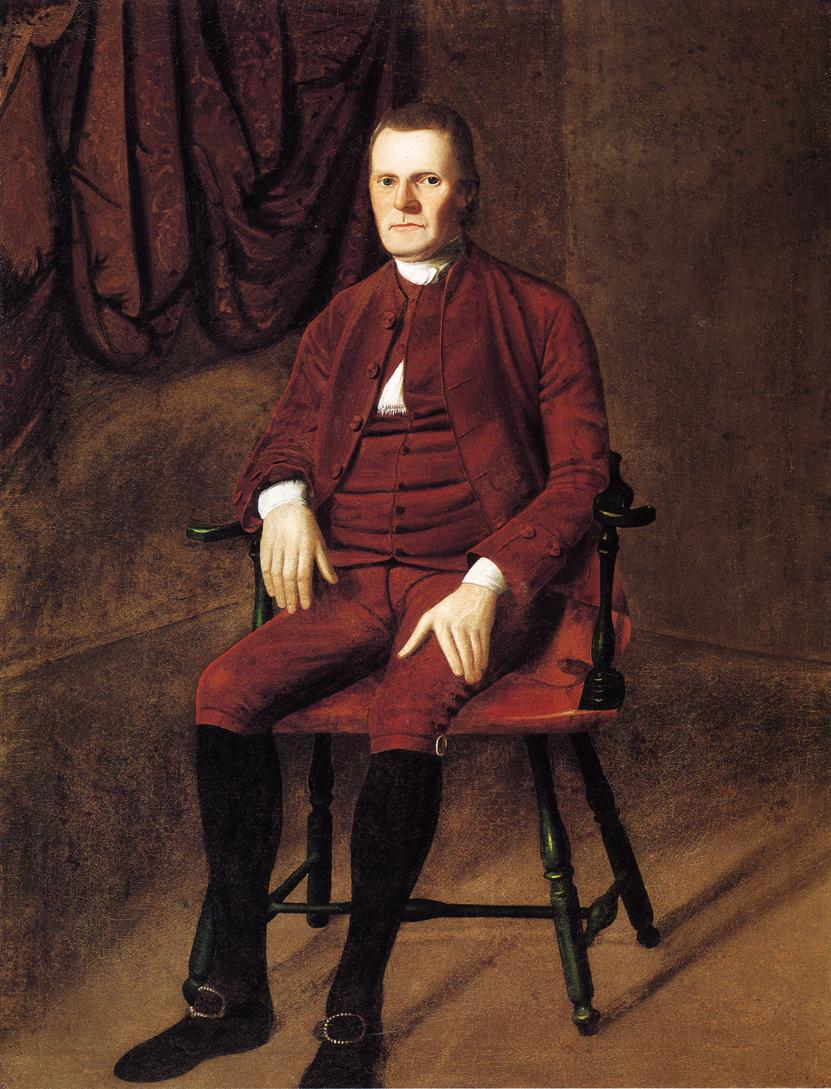
Roger Sherman

- Dean Acheson (Middletown)
- Solomon Flagg Alderman (East Granby)
- Abraham Baldwin (Guilford)
- Roger Sherman Baldwin (New Haven)
- Ebenezer Bassett (Derby)
- Donald Berwick (Moodus)
- Cofer Black (Stamford)
- George H. W. Bush (Greenwich)
- George W. Bush (New Haven)
- Prescott Bush (Greenwich)
- Elinor Carbone (Torrington)
- Orlow W. Chapman (Ellington)
- Ezra Clark Jr. (Hartford)
- Anthony Comstock (New Canaan)
- Joe Courtney (Hartford)
- Silas Deane (Groton)
- Robert E. De Forest (Bridgeport)
- Walter Forward (East Granby)
- Rosa DeLauro (New Haven)
- Christopher Dodd (Willimantic)
- Peter H. Dominick (Stamford)
- Oliver Ellsworth (Windsor)
- Anna Eshoo (New Britain)
- John Fabrizi (Bridgeport)
- Gary Franks (Waterbury)
- Porter J. Goss (Waterbury)
- Ella T. Grasso (Windsor Locks)
- Galusha A. Grow (Ashford)
- Lyman Hall (Wallingford)
- Jahana Hayes (Waterbury)
- Hope Hicks (Greenwich)
- Titus Hosmer (Middletown)
- Samuel Huntington (Windham)
- Robert A. Hurley (Bridgeport)
- William Samuel Johnson (Stratford)
- Ethel Skakel Kennedy (Greenwich)
- Henry Kissinger (Kent)
- John Larson (East Hartford)
- Scooter Libby (New Haven)
- Joe Lieberman (Stamford)
- Phineas C. Lounsbury (Ridgefield)
- Clare Boothe Luce (Ridgefield)
- Dannel Malloy (Stamford)
- Thirman Milner (Hartford)
- Robert Moses (New Haven)
- Constance Motley (New Haven)
- Ralph Nader (Winsted)
- Frederick Walker Pitkin (Manchester)
- Adam Clayton Powell Jr. (New Haven)
- Abraham A. Ribicoff (New Britain)
- Pete Rouse (New Haven)
- John G. Rowland (Waterbury)
- Christopher Shays (Bridgeport)
- Roger Sherman (New Haven and New Milford)
- Samuel Simons (Bridgeport)
- Joseph Spencer (East Haddam)
- Kathleen Kennedy Townsend (Greenwich)
- Jonathan Trumbull (Lebanon)
- Jonathan Trumbull Jr. (Lebanon)
- Lyman Trumbull (Colchester)
- Donald Verrilli Jr. (Wilton)
- Morrison Waite (Lyme)
- Mark Warner (Vernon)
- Gideon Welles (Glastonbury)
- William Williams (Lebanon)
- Oliver Wolcott (Windsor)
- Oliver Wolcott Jr. (Litchfield)
- Richard G. Woodbury (New Haven)

== Religious and spiritual figures ==
- Ebenezer Baldwin (Norwich)
- Henry Ward Beecher (Litchfield)
- Lyman Beecher (New Haven)
- Aaron Burr Sr. (Fairfield)
- Blackleach Burritt (Huntington)
- Horace Bushnell (Litchfield)
- Henry Sloane Coffin (Lakeville)
- Jonathan Edwards (East Windsor)
- Charles Grandison Finney (Warren)
- Gordon Hall (Tolland)
- Lucia Ruggles Holman (Brookfield)
- Michael J. McGivney (New Haven)
- Kenneth Pike (Woodstock)
- Henry Weston Smith (Ellington)
- Ed & Lorraine Warren (Monroe)
- Wilford Woodruff (Avon)
- John Zaffis (Stratford)

== YouTube celebrities ==
- Jack Baran (Fairfield)
- Eugenia Cooney (Greenwich)
- Charli D'Amelio (Norwalk)
- Dixie D'Amelio (Norwalk)
- Anthony Fantano (Wolcott)
- Casey Neistat (Ledyard)
- Daymon Patterson (New Britain)

== Other figures ==
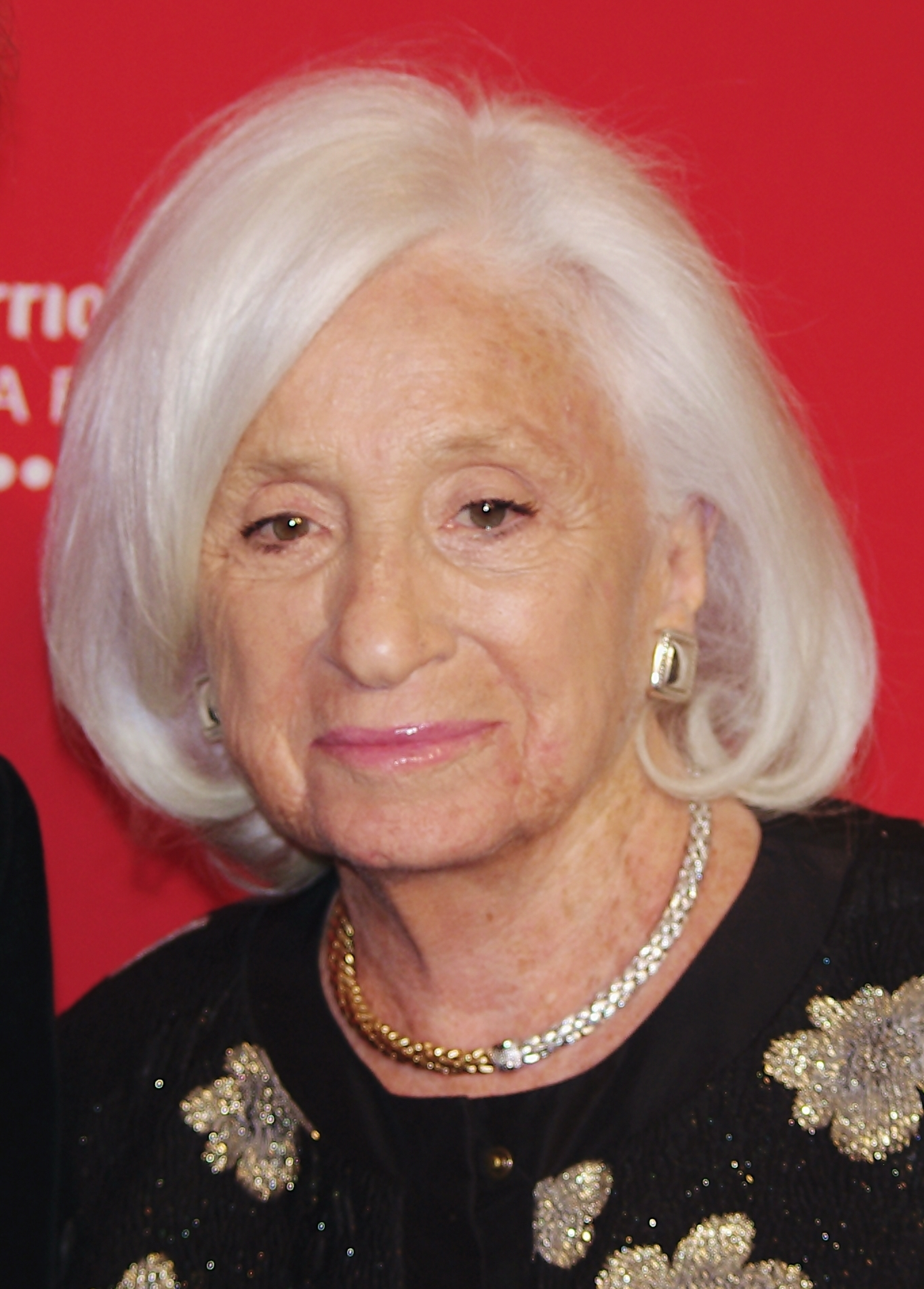
Marion Wiesel

- Ruth Maxon Adams (New Haven)
- Erin Brady (East Hampton)
- Keith Carlos (Bridgeport)
- Fanny Hallock Carpenter (Rainbow)
- John Carpenter (Hamden)
- Scott Conant (Waterbury)
- Lydia Hearst (Wilton)
- Helen Keller (Easton)
- Annie Le (New Haven)
- Ruth Madoff (New York City, Old Greenwich)
- Anthony Megale (Stamford)
- Marion Wiesel (Greenwich)

== See also ==
- List of Connecticut suffragists
- List of people from Bridgeport, Connecticut
- List of people from Brookfield, Connecticut
- List of people from Darien, Connecticut
- List of people from Greenwich, Connecticut
- List of people from Hartford, Connecticut
- List of people from New Canaan, Connecticut
- List of people from New Haven, Connecticut
- List of people from Norwalk, Connecticut
- List of people from Redding, Connecticut
- List of people from Ridgefield, Connecticut
- List of people from Stamford, Connecticut
- List of people from Westport, Connecticut
