= Kenneth Young (Scottish composer) =

Scottish composer

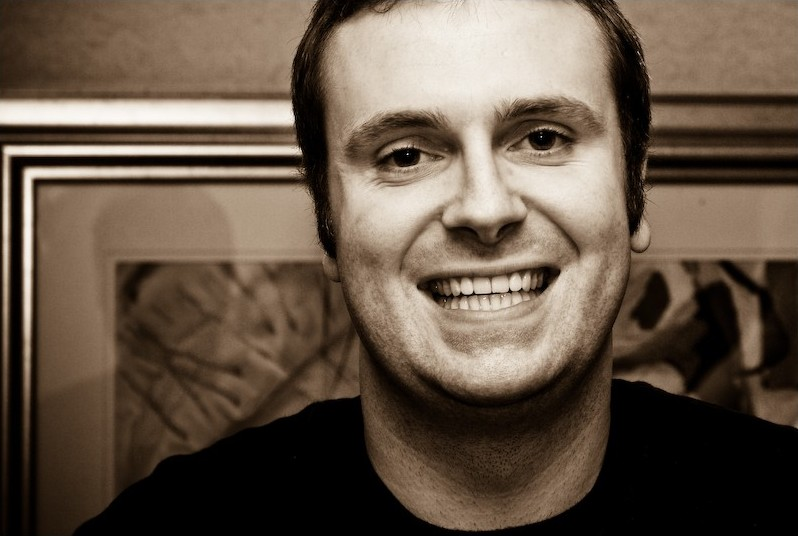
- Kenneth Young

Background information
- Born: Kenneth Comrie Macleod Young; 6 October 1980 (age 46); Edinburgh, Scotland
- Genre: Video game music
- Occupations: Composer, musician, sound designer, audio director, writer
- Instruments: Fiddle, guitar, nyckelharpa, cello, viola, mandolin, Concertina, ukulele
- Years active: 2004–present
- Label: Media Molecule
- Website: kennyyoung.com

Kenneth Young, also known as Kenneth C. M. Young or Kenny Young, is a Scottish freelance audio director, composer, sound designer and writer. He is best known for his award-winning work on the audio experiences in Media Molecule's LittleBigPlanet and Tearaway video game franchises, and the music of Team Asobi's Astro Bot games.

== Early life and education ==
Young was born in Edinburgh, Scotland, and had a strong musical upbringing, learning the violin from the age of six, but chose not to pursue performance as a career and instead went on to study an undergraduate degree in Music Technology at the University of Edinburgh. That course introduced him to working creatively with sound and he went on to gain an MA in Sound Design at Bournemouth University for which he received a distinction.

== Career ==
Young began his professional career in 2004 working as a junior sound designer in the centralised audio department of Sony London Studio. He worked on a broad range of different gaming experiences and hardware platforms, from action-adventure games such as The Getaway: Black Monday and Heavenly Sword to more family-friendly and innovative titles such as EyeToy: Kinetic. He has described this period as "an apprenticeship" and a "baptism by fire" which stood him in good stead for his future game audio work.

Young left Sony in 2007 and joined startup video game developer Media Molecule to establish their audio department and "make LittleBigPlanet sound awesome".

LittleBigPlanet's audio aesthetic: minimal, playful yet endlessly customizable building blocks of sound and music that support, underpin and emphasize the playfulness inherent in the game's unique art direction, character design and game design structure. Rather than seamlessly flowing together, the varied pieces of music work together much like the patchwork evident in the game's visual assets, nowhere is this aesthetic more evident than in the many user created online levels. Again, a difficult game to imagine working without the many unique aspects to its audio direction.

— Rob Bridgett, Game Audio Culture, p. 44

The audio experience in LittleBigPlanet was very well received, garnering an exceptional eight GANG award nominations in 2009, more than any other game that year, and four academy nominations. Young and fellow composer Mat Clark won the GANG awards for Best Original Instrumental (for "The Gardens") and Best Interactive Score.

For LittleBigPlanet 2, Young built upon the eclecticism of the original's soundtrack by working with six other composers, the results of which achieved a nomination in 2012 for Outstanding Achievement in Original Music Composition from the Academy of Interactive Arts & Sciences.

Tearaway's folk-infused soundtrack received a 2014 British Academy Video Games Award nomination for Original Music and is notable for its hand-made aesthetic, being written and performed entirely by Young and co-composer Brian D'Oliveira. Kotaku's Kirk Hamilton considered it one of the best video game soundtracks of 2013, writing "It's jarring to hear out-of-tune instruments in a video game; we've become so accustomed to pitch-perfect digital performances that any hint of humanity is startling. I'd like to be startled like this more often".

On 27 February 2015, Young announced that he was leaving Media Molecule to pursue a freelance career.

== Works ==
=== Games ===
Game	Year	Platform	Developer	Credit
Astro Bot	2024	PlayStation 5	Team Asobi	Composer
Astro's Playroom	2020	PlayStation 5	Team Asobi	Composer
Knights and Bikes	2019	PlayStation 4, Microsoft Windows	Foam Sword	Audio designer
Astro Bot Rescue Mission	2018	PlayStation VR	Team Asobi	Composer
WonderWorlds	2017	iOS	Glowmade	Composer, sound designer
Tethered	2016	PlayStation VR, Oculus Rift, HTC Vive	Secret Sorcery	Composer, sound designer
Tearaway Unfolded	2015	PlayStation 4	Media Molecule	Audio director; composer with Brian D'Oliveira
LittleBigPlanet 3	2014	PlayStation 3, 4	Sumo Digital	Special thanks; composer with Si Begg, Chrome Canyon, Mat Clark, Brian D'Oliviera, The Emperor Machine, Jim Fowler, Joe Henson, Winifred Phillips, David Poore, Alexis Smith, Paul Thomson, Ugress
Run Sackboy! Run!	2014	iOS, Android, PlayStation Vita	Firesprite	Composer with Christoffer Berg, Mat Clark, Joe Henson, Alexis Smith, Keith Tenniswood
Tearaway	2013	PlayStation Vita	Media Molecule	Head of audio; composer with Brian D'Oliveira
LittleBigPlanet Vita	2012	PlayStation Vita	Double Eleven, Tarsier Studios	Special thanks; composer with Todd Baker, Christoffer Berg, Joe Henson, Richard Jacques, Tobias Lilja, Dominic Parker, Winifred Phillips, David Poore, Alexis Smith, Stakula, Paul Thomson
LittleBigPlanet Karting	2012	PlayStation 3	United Front Games	Composer with Mat Clark, Winifred Phillips, Richard Jacques, Keith Tenniswood
LittleBigPlanet 2	2011	PlayStation 3	Media Molecule	Audio lead; composer with Baiyon, Richard Jacques, Keith Tenniswood, Daniel Pemberton, Winifred Phillips, Paul Thomson
LittleBigPlanet	2008	PlayStation 3	Media Molecule	Audio designer; composer with Mat Clark, Daniel Pemberton
Heavenly Sword	2007	PlayStation 3	Ninja Theory	Dialogue dubbing editor
24: The Game	2006	PlayStation 2	Cambridge Studio	Cinematic Sound Designer
Gangs of London	2006	PSP	London Studio	Sound designer
Go! Sudoku	2006	PSP	London Studio	Composer with Alistair Lindsay, Dave Ranyard
EyeToy: Kinetic Combat	2006	PlayStation 2	London Studio	Sound designer
EyeToy: Operation Spy	2005	PlayStation 2	London Studio	Sound designer
Fired Up	2005	PSP	London Studio	Sound designer
EyeToy: Kinetic	2005	PlayStation 2	London Studio	Sound designer; composer with Alistair Lindsay, Dave Ranyard
The Getaway: Black Monday	2004	PlayStation 2	London Studio	Sound designer
EyeToy: Chat	2004	PlayStation 2	London Studio	Sound designer

=== Albums ===
The official video game soundtrack album for Tearaway was released alongside the game as a pre-order bonus on 22 November 2013. The album was later made available via the PlayStation Network.

The official video game soundtrack album for Tearaway Unfolded was released alongside the game on 8 September 2015 via the PlayStation Network and on 16 October 2015 via iTunes.

The official video game soundtrack album for Tethered was released alongside the game on 27 October 2016 via the PlayStation Network and on 27 February 2017 via Steam.

The official video game soundtrack album for WonderWorlds was released on 11 December 2017.

The official video game soundtrack album for Astro Bot Rescue Mission was released on 30 January 2019, with a vinyl album following in August 2020.

The official video game soundtrack album for Astro's Playroom was released on 12 March 2021.

The official video game soundtrack album for Astro Bot was released on 5 October 2024.

=== Writing ===
Young started the website gamesound.org in 2005 "as a useful resource for those who work in, aspire to work in, or wish to learn more about game sound". Most of his own writing featured on the site is focused on the subject of the use of voice in games. He has twice won the GANG Best Game Audio Article Publication or Broadcast award for his articles The Use of Voice in Portal 2 (2012) and The Mix in The Last of Us (2015).

He has also written for designingsound.org, and contributed a chapter to the book Production Pipeline Fundamentals for Film and Games, edited by Renee Dunlop, entitled The Game Audio Pipeline.

Young was co-writer of Tearaway's and Tearaway Unfolded's voice script with the game's lead creator, Rex Crowle.

== Awards and nominations ==
Year	Result	Award	Category	Work
2025	Nominated	AIAS	Outstanding Achievement in Original Music Composition	Astro Bot
2025	Won	New York Game Awards	Tin Pan Alley Award for Best Music in a Game	Astro Bot
2025	Won	Game Developers Choice Awards	Best Audio ("Special Thanks")	Astro Bot
2025	Nominated	Game Audio Network Guild Awards	Best Game Music Cover ("Bot of War")	Astro Bot
2024	Nominated	The Game Awards	Best Score and Music	Astro Bot
2021	Nominated	BAFTA	Audio Achievement	Astro's Playroom
2020	Nominated	IGF	Excellence in Audio	Knights and Bikes
2020	Nominated	GANG	Best Sound Design In An Indie Game	Knights and Bikes
2020	Nominated	GANG	Best Game Audio Article Publication or Broadcast	Thoughts On Game Audio History'
2020	Nominated	MCV/Develop	Audio Innovation of the Year	Knights and Bikes
2020	Nominated	Develop: Star Awards	Best Audio	Knights and Bikes
2020	Nominated	Game Dev Heroes	Sound	—N/a
2019	Nominated	Game Audio Awards	Best Game Music	Astro Bot Rescue Mission
2019	Won	Guildford Games Awards	Creative	Astro Bot Rescue Mission
2018	Nominated	HMMA	Original Song - Video Game	Astro Bot Rescue Mission
2018	Nominated	GANG	Best Music for an Indie Game	WonderWorlds
2017	Nominated	GANG	Best Interactive Score	Tethered
2017	Nominated	GANG	Best Game Audio Article Publication or Broadcast	The VR Soundscape of Secret Sorcery's Tethered
2016	Nominated	GANG	Music of the Year	Tearaway Unfolded
2016	Nominated	TIGA	Best Audio Design	Tearaway Unfolded
2015	Won	GANG	Best Game Audio Article Publication or Broadcast	The Mix In 'The Last of Us'
2014	Nominated	BAFTA	Original Music	Tearaway
2014	Won	GANG	Best Handheld Audio	Tearaway
2014	Nominated	GDC	Best Audio	Tearaway
2014	Nominated	SXSW	Excellence in Musical Score	Tearaway
2014	Nominated	Golden Joysticks	Best Audio	Tearaway
2014	Nominated	GMAs	Outstanding Achievement: In-Game Music	Tearaway
2014	Nominated	GMAs	Best Soundtrack: Western	Tearaway
2014	Won	IGN	Best PS Vita Sound	Tearaway
2014	Won	The Vita Lounge	Best Soundtrack	Tearaway
2012	Nominated	AIAS	Outstanding Achievement in Original Music Composition	LittleBigPlanet 2
2012	Nominated	GANG	Best Use of Licensed Music	LittleBigPlanet 2
2012	Nominated	GDC	Best Audio	LittleBigPlanet 2
2012	Won	GMAs	Outstanding Achievement: Licensed Music	LittleBigPlanet 2
2012	Nominated	NAVGTR	Original Light Mix Score, Franchise	LittleBigPlanet 2
2012	Won	GANG	Best Game Audio Article Publication or Broadcast	The Use of Voice in Portal 2
2009	Nominated	BAFTA	Original Score	LittleBigPlanet
2009	Nominated	BAFTA	Use of Audio	LittleBigPlanet
2009	Nominated	AIAS	Outstanding Achievement in Sound Design	LittleBigPlanet
2009	Nominated	AIAS	Outstanding Achievement in Soundtrack	LittleBigPlanet
2009	Won	AIAS	Outstanding Achievement in Character Performance	LittleBigPlanet
2009	Won	GANG	Best Interactive Score	LittleBigPlanet
2009	Won	GANG	Best Original Instrumental	LittleBigPlanet (for "The Gardens", tied with "Main Theme" from Afrika)
2009	Nominated	GANG	Audio of the Year	LittleBigPlanet
2009	Nominated	GANG	Music of the Year	LittleBigPlanet
2009	Nominated	GANG	Sound Design of the Year	LittleBigPlanet
2009	Nominated	GANG	Best Original Vocal: Choral	LittleBigPlanet
2009	Nominated	GANG	Best Use of Licensed Music	LittleBigPlanet
2009	Nominated	GANG	Best Dialogue	LittleBigPlanet
2009	Nominated	GDC	Best Audio	LittleBigPlanet
2009	Nominated	TEC Awards	Outstanding Creative Achievement in Interactive Entertainment Sound Production	LittleBigPlanet
2009	Nominated	Spike VGAs	Best Original Score	LittleBigPlanet
2009	Nominated	Spike VGAs	Best Soundtrack	LittleBigPlanet
