= The Playroom (2013 video game) =

2013 video game

- Developer: Japan Studio (Note: Main development by Team Asobi. Additional artwork by Firesprite, My Alien Buddy downloadable content by Double Fine Productions)
- Publisher: Sony Computer Entertainment
- Director: Nicolas Doucet
- Composer: Tadashi Yatabe
- Series: Astro Bot
- Platform: PlayStation 4
- Release: NA: November 15, 2013; PAL: November 29, 2013; JP: February 22, 2014
- Genre: Augmented reality
- Modes: Single-player, multiplayer

The Playroom is a video game developed by Japan Studio's Team Asobi division and published by Sony Computer Entertainment for the PlayStation 4. It is a collection of augmented reality mini-games meant to demonstrate the use of the PlayStation Camera and the DualShock 4 controller and comes preloaded with all PlayStation 4 consoles. The PlayStation Camera accessory is required to play The Playroom. If a camera is not present, a trailer for The Playroom will be displayed instead of the full game. Firesprite, a studio founded by former employees of Studio Liverpool, worked on the visuals of The Playroom. Downloadable content is free.

Despite not being mentioned on the PlayStation 5 incompatibility list, The Playroom is not playable on the PS5, therefore being a PlayStation 4 exclusive.

== Minigames ==
=== Play with Asobi ===
Asobi is a pet-like robot that can be summoned by rubbing the Touch Pad. Players can interact with Asobi in various ways, and Asobi has the ability to recognize different people through facial recognition. Asobi is an evolution of the previous Sony Computer Entertainment title EyePet.

=== AR Bots ===
AR Bots is a minigame that places forty robots in the DualShock 4 controller, which can be seen by swiping down on the touch pad in-game. When in the in-controller view, players can interact with the robots through the controller, utilizing the motion sensor and the buttons. The robots can also be displayed on the television instead of the controller screen by swiping up on the touch pad. When the robots are on the television, it is possible to physically interact with the robots using the PlayStation camera's depth capabilities.

=== AR Hockey ===
Air Hockey, referred to in-game as AR hockey, uses two controllers to augment a virtual play field in front of the players. The motion sensor stretches the play field, and the touch pad is used to control the paddles to return the ball. The first player who scores seven points wins the game.

== Downloadable content ==
There are four add-ons, all of which are free. Two of these add-ons: Toy Maker and AR Studio, enrich the experience by taking advantage of the second screen capabilities built into the official PlayStation App.

=== Toy Maker ===
Toy Maker is free downloadable content (DLC) for The Playroom which takes advantage of the PlayStation App, allowing users to interact with the AR Bots through tablets, smartphones or the PlayStation Vita. Players can create a two dimensional drawing which will become a three dimensional toy for the AR Bots to play with. The Toy Maker DLC was released on 26 November 2013 in North America and was available at the PlayStation 4 launch in Europe on 29 November 2013.

=== My Alien Buddy ===
Double Fine Productions created free downloadable content, titled My Alien Buddy, which utilized the skills in augmented reality mini-games that Double Fine learned while making the Xbox Live Arcade Kinect games Double Fine Happy Action Theater and Kinect Party for Microsoft. The alien buddy is a deformable toy with which the player can interact. My Alien Buddy was released on 24 December 2013.

=== Ninja Bots ===
A DLC game in which the player controls a ninja AR Bot, evading traps and firing shurikens. The Ninja Bots DLC was released on 13 March 2014 and supports up to four players.

=== AR Studio ===
Japan Studio created free DLC content, titled AR Studio, which, when used in conjunction with the PlayStation App, adds many features to help aspiring streamers set the stage for their own unique talk show. A few included features are: colored smoke that comes out of the Dualshock 4 by pressing the touchpad, up to 3 different colored spotlights, a variety of screen filters, and a handful of virtual masks the streamer can put over their face.

== The Playroom VR ==
The Playroom VR
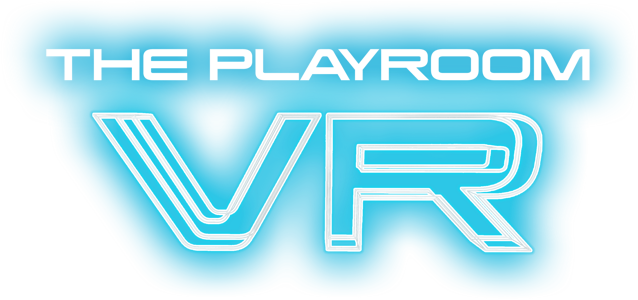
- Developer: Japan Studio (Team Asobi)
- Publisher: Sony Interactive Entertainment
- Director: Nicolas Doucet
- Producer: Nicolas Doucet
- Composers: Sachiko Miyano; Takuro Iga; Tadashi Yatabe
- Series: Astro Bot
- Platform: PlayStation 4
- Release: 2016
- Genres: Virtual reality, minigames
- Modes: single-player, multiplayer

A virtual reality game, titled The Playroom VR, was released in October of 2016. It contains a series of asymmetrical multiplayer minigames to demonstrate the features of PlayStation VR (running on the PlayStation 4). It comes free with the VR headset and contains six minigames: Cat and Mouse, Monster Escape, Wanted, Toy Wars, Ghost House, and Robots Rescue. The Playroom VR received "generally favorable reviews" according to review aggregator Metacritic based on six critic reviews. Simon Fitzgerald of Push Square called it a "good collection of couch co-op mini-games that demonstrate the capabilities of the VR headset superbly. Although a few of the games you'll play once and never touch again, Robots Rescue is a standout experience that you'll wish was a fully-fledged game in itself". Robots Rescue would later be made into a fully-fledged game called Astro Bot Rescue Mission.

Unlike the non-VR version of The Playroom, The Playroom VR is compatible with PlayStation 5.

== See also ==
- Astro Bot series
  - Astro Bot Rescue Mission, 2018 game for PlayStation VR, starring the Bots seen in-game
  - Astro's Playroom, the 2020 sequel to Astro Bot Rescue Mission and a tech demo for the PlayStation 5
  - Astro Bot, the 2024 sequel to Astro's Playroom
