= Astro Bot (series) =

Video game series

- Genres: Platform; Augmented reality
- Developers: Japan Studio; Team Asobi
- Publisher: Sony Interactive Entertainment
- Creator: Nicolas Doucet
- Composer: Kenneth C. M. Young
- Platforms: PlayStation 4 PlayStation 5
- First release: The Playroom; November 15, 2013
- Latest release: Astro Bot; September 6, 2024

Astro Bot (Note: Japanese: アストロボット, Hepburn: Asutorobotto) is a series of virtual reality and platform games developed by Team Asobi, originally a group within Japan Studio, and published by Sony Interactive Entertainment. The series is a spin-off of The Playroom series, and began with the 2013 launch title for the PlayStation 4, and its later entries have won numerous awards.

== Setting ==
Each game in the Astro Bot series takes place within PlayStation peripherals and consoles. Games in the series released on the PlayStation 4 took place within the player's DualShock 4 controller. Games released on the PlayStation 5 take place inside the player's PlayStation 5 console.

== Gameplay ==
The gameplay of The Playroom and The Playroom VR consists of different minigames that emphasise the capabilities of the DualShock 4 controller, PlayStation Camera, and PlayStation VR, respectively. Titles from Astro Bot Rescue Mission onward are platformers; the player controls the titular character, Astro Bot, as he rescues numerous robots from his crew that are scattered across different worlds. Astro has access to numerous powerups and moves, including jumping, hovering, punching, and spin-attacking. Whilst being a platformer akin to Astro Bot Rescue Mission, Astro's Playroom also serves as a tech demo for the PlayStation 5's DualSense controller.

Throughout Astro's Playroom, "VIP Bots" can be seen throughout the game's four worlds, and artifacts based on previous PlayStation consoles can be obtained for display at PlayStation Labo. In Astro Bot, the "VIP Bot" roster has increased, and now can be saved and thus recruited.

== Games ==
Release timeline
2013	The Playroom
2014
2015
2016	The Playroom VR
2017
2018	Astro Bot Rescue Mission
2019
2020	Astro's Playroom
2021
2022
2023
2024	Astro Bot

Overview of Astro Bot video games
Year	Title	Platforms	Developer
2013	The Playroom	PlayStation 4	Japan Studio
2016	The Playroom VR	PlayStation 4	Japan Studio
2018	Astro Bot Rescue Mission	PlayStation 4	Japan Studio
2020	Astro's Playroom	PlayStation 5	Japan Studio
2024	Astro Bot	PlayStation 5	Team Asobi

=== The Playroom ===
The Playroom is a collection of augmented reality mini-games meant to demonstrate the use of the PlayStation Camera and the DualShock 4 controller, and comes preloaded with all PlayStation 4 consoles. The PlayStation Camera accessory is required to play the game. If a camera is not present, only a trailer for The Playroom will be displayed and the game cannot be accessed. Firesprite, a studio founded by former employees of Studio Liverpool, worked on the visuals. Downloadable content is free, with Double Fine assisting in development.

=== The Playroom VR ===
The Playroom VR, is a virtual reality game released on October 13, 2016. It contains a series of asymmetrical multiplayer minigames to demonstrate the features of PlayStation VR (running on the PlayStation 4). It comes free with the VR headset and contains six minigames: Cat and Mouse, Monster Escape, Wanted, Toy Wars, Ghost House, and Robots Rescue.

=== Astro Bot Rescue Mission ===
Rescue Mission stars a cast of robot characters first introduced in The Playroom, where they appeared as robots that lived inside of the DualShock 4 controller. In the game, the player teams up with Captain Astro and goes on a quest to rescue his lost crew scattered across different worlds.

=== Astro's Playroom ===
Similarly to The Playroom for PlayStation 4, Astro's Playroom comes pre-installed on every PlayStation 5, serving as a sequel to Rescue Mission and additionally as a free tech demo for the DualSense controller.

Astro's Playroom was announced on June 11, 2020, at the PlayStation 5 reveal event, was released on November 12, 2020, and was the final game released by Japan Studio before their dissolution in April 2021, when Team Asobi was formally spun off into an independent studio within Sony's PlayStation Studios.

=== Astro Bot ===
Astro Bot, was announced on May 30, 2024, and was released for the PlayStation 5 on September 6, 2024. It was the first game featuring Astro not to be developed by Japan Studio due to its dissolution. The game was released in celebration of PlayStation's 30th anniversary. Astro Bot won multiple awards, including Game of the Year.

== Reception ==
Aggregate review scores
Game	Metacritic	OpenCritic
The Playroom	—	—
The Playroom VR	77/100	—
Astro Bot Rescue Mission	90/100	92% recommend
Astro's Playroom	83/100	91% recommend
Astro Bot	94/100	99% recommend

While the original game does not have an aggregate score according to Metacritic, The Playroom VR and Astro's Playroom received "generally favorable reviews" based on six and seventy-two critic reviews, respectively. Simon Fitzgerald of Push Square called The Playroom VR a "good collection of couch co-op mini-games that demonstrate the capabilities of the VR headset superbly. Although a few of the games you'll play once and never touch again, Robots Rescue is a standout experience that you'll wish was a fully-fledged game in itself."

According to Metacritic, Rescue Mission and Astro Bot are both critically acclaimed based on over fifty reviews for each game. Rescue Mission would later be nominated for several awards and many publications have referred to Astro Bot as a masterpiece.
