= Team Asobi =

Japanese video game developer

- Logo used since 2021
- Type: Division
- Industry: Video games
- Predecessor: Japan Studio
- Founded: 2012; 14 years ago (as a division of Japan Studio); April 1, 2021; 5 years ago (as Team Asobi)
- Headquarters: Tokyo, Japan
- Key people: Nicolas Doucet (Studio Director, Creative Director)
- Products: Astro Bot series
- Number of employees: 65 (2024)
- Parent: Japan Studio (2012–2021); PlayStation Studios (2021–present)
- Website: teamasobi.com

Team Asobi is a Japanese video game developer based in Tokyo. A first-party studio for Sony Interactive Entertainment, Team Asobi was originally formed in 2012 as part of Japan Studio, but formally spun off into an independent studio within Sony's PlayStation Studios in April 2021. It is best known for the Astro Bot series.

== History ==
First logo (2018–2021)

Team Asobi was first formed in 2012 as an internal part of Japan Studio based in Tokyo by Nicolas Doucet. The team's name is derived from the Japanese word "Asobi", meaning "Play". After forming, they worked on technical demos and went on to develop The Playroom (2013), a pre-downloaded augmented reality game designed to demonstrate the use of the PlayStation Camera and DualShock 4 for the PlayStation 4. Doucet and several members of his team had been developers for games for the EyeToy and had brought their knowledge forward for use on The Playroom. Team Asobi also created a virtual reality version The Playroom VR to demonstrate the PlayStation VR unit with its release in 2016. The Playroom introduced a small robotic character, then named "A5081" which visually resembles the word "ASOBI", and became the reference for the Astro Bot character used in their later games, Astro Bot Rescue Mission (2018), Astro's Playroom (2020), and the winner of Game of the Year at The Game Awards 2024 and the 28th Annual D.I.C.E. Awards, Astro Bot (2024).

Across late 2020 and early 2021, several staff members of Japan Studio, outside those of Team Asobi, announced their departure; Sony later affirmed that by April 2021, Japan Studio would be refocused around Team Asobi based on the success of Astro's Playroom. In June 2021, Sony announced that Team Asobi had been transitioned to a standalone studio within PlayStation Studios. Doucet remains Asobi's studio director and creative director following this transition. Since January 6, 2025, Astro Bot has become the most awarded platformer game of all time, beating out It Takes Two with a current total of 106 Game of the Year nominations and wins.

== Games developed ==
Year	Title	Platform(s)	Ref.
2013	The Playroom	PlayStation 4	
2016	The Playroom VR	PlayStation 4	
2018	Astro Bot Rescue Mission	PlayStation 4	
2020	Astro's Playroom	PlayStation 5	
2024	Astro Bot	PlayStation 5	
