= Astro Bot =

2024 video game

- Developer: Team Asobi
- Publisher: Sony Interactive Entertainment
- Director: Nicolas Doucet
- Producer: Nicolas Doucet
- Designer: Gento Morita
- Programmer: Masayuki Yamada
- Artist: Sebastian Brueckner
- Composer: Kenneth C. M. Young
- Series: Astro Bot
- Platform: PlayStation 5
- Release: WW: September 6, 2024
- Genres: Platform, action-adventure
- Mode: Single-player

Astro Bot (Note: Japanese: アストロボット, Hepburn: Asutorobotto) is a 2024 platform game developed by Team Asobi and published by Sony Interactive Entertainment for the PlayStation 5 in celebration of PlayStation's 30th anniversary. It is the fifth game in the Astro Bot series, following Astro's Playroom (2020), and Team Asobi's first game since its separation from Japan Studio.

As Astro, the player embarks on a quest to save lost robots, retrieve parts for the PlayStation 5 mothership, and defeat the alien Space Bully Nebulax. Much like the previous title Astro's Playroom, Astro Bot uses DualSense controller features including adaptive triggers and haptic feedback.

Astro Bot became the highest-rated game of 2024 on Metacritic. Critics praised the gameplay, level design, and content, with some comparing the game to Nintendo franchises, particularly the Super Mario series. Astro Bot won multiple awards including Game of the Year at the Game Awards 2024, the 21st British Academy Games Awards, and the 28th Annual D.I.C.E. Awards.

== Gameplay ==
Astro Bot is a 3D platformer in which the player controls a small robot, Astro Bot, with the DualSense controller. Astro's move set is identical to his previous incarnations from Astro Bot Rescue Mission and Astro's Playroom, maintaining his ability to jump, hover, punch, and spin-attack. The ability to swim underwater also makes a return from Astro Bot Rescue Mission, having been absent in Astro's Playroom.

=== Levels ===
The base game has 90 levels, split across six galaxies and 60 planets. Each galaxy contains progression levels (which must be beaten to access the boss stage) and challenge levels (which are optional and are typically higher in difficulty as a result). Upon completing enough progression levels and collecting the requisite number of Bots, the boss stage becomes unlocked, the completion of which leads to a level centered around a certain V.I.P. Bot. Upon the completion of that level, a new galaxy is unlocked.

Traversal between the galaxies and levels is achieved through the "Dual Speeder"; a spaceship modeled after the PlayStation 5 DualSense controller. The Dual Speeder is controlled by holding down the analog triggers and physically tilting the DualSense. It can also move around freely on the level selection screen, where it can collide with incoming asteroids and unlock some of the game's optional stages and collect some of the game's puzzle pieces.

Similar to Astro Bot Rescue Mission, every level contains a set number of Bots that Astro has to rescue, ranging from seven Bots in the main platformer levels to only one or two Bots in the boss fights and challenge levels. Each world also requires the player to collect a certain number of Bots before progressing onward. 332 Bots can be rescued and recruited in total: 301 in the base game, 27 via DLC levels, and 4 obtainable through rescue missions in the free-to-play predecessor Astro's Playroom. Unlike in Rescue Mission, "V.I.P. Bots" (collectible Bots which reference various PlayStation characters in their visual appearance and behavior) can also be rescued and recruited. There are over 150 unique V.I.P. Bots, with more expected to be included alongside free DLC levels. Many of the "deep cut" Bot characters from PlayStation's history are rescuable in the game's challenge levels. The likeness of each of the V.I.P. Bots originate from both Sony Interactive Entertainment franchises and franchises owned by third-parties by the likes of Activision, Arc System Works, Argonaut Software, Atlus, Bandai Namco Entertainment, BlueTwelve Studio, Capcom, Crystal Dynamics, Ember Lab, Koei Tecmo, Konami, Mediatonic, Oddworld Inhabitants, Polyarc, SHIFT UP, Sega, Square Enix, THA LTD, Team17, Ubisoft, and Young Horses.

Five of the game's levels are based heavily on classic PlayStation franchises, which in turn, each represent previous PlayStation consoles – namely Ape Escape (PlayStation), God of War (PlayStation 2), (Note: While the God of War franchise originated on the PlayStation 2, the era which is represented in Astro Bot is the Norse era, which is more associated with the PlayStation 4 and PlayStation 5 consoles.) Uncharted (PlayStation 3), LocoRoco (PlayStation Portable), and Horizon (PlayStation 4). These levels allow the player to utilize the abilities of the heroes of these PlayStation franchises, such as Spike's Monkey Net being the forefront of the Ape Escape-themed level and or Kratos' Leviathan Axe in the God of War-themed level.

=== Abilities and controls ===
Astro's Twin-Frog Gloves can be used to defeat certain enemies by pulling them toward the player.

Astro has access to 15 new abilities, which attach to him and enhance both his traversal and combative capabilities. Some of these new abilities include Barkster the Bulldog Booster (granting Astro the ability to air-dash through enemies and terrain), Keri Kero the Twin-Frog Gloves (allowing Astro to punch enemies from a distance and swing/slingshot off surfaces painted red), and Handy-D the Monkey (allowing Astro to climb on banana-shaped climbing holds, throw rocks at enemies and slam the ground). The boss battles present at the end of each galaxy are fought with the help of these abilities.

The game provides a selection of accessibility settings, which include granting the player the option to play the game with a single analog stick (with camera controls instead coming from a single button press), support for the PlayStation Access controller, and the option to disable the gyro controls, haptic feedback, and adaptive triggers. A bluebird helper may also be purchased, helping the player uncover any Bots or puzzle pieces which they might have missed on their first attempt at the level, available for purchase at the beginning of each level from the second attempt onward.

=== Hub world ===
All of the Bots that have been collected can be viewed in a centralized hub world called the Crash Site, where they can be viewed and interacted with; many V.I.P. Bots will perform special actions when Astro punches them, such as the Bot based on Ratchet from Ratchet & Clank dropping all of his Bolts and scrambling to pick them back up. The Crash Site also contains hidden puzzle pieces, Bots, and secret companions, many of which require help from a certain amount of rescued Bots. Collecting puzzle pieces throughout the game unlocks the Gatcha (Note: Stylization of the word "Gacha") Lab (where Astro can spend coins to unlock collectibles and special items for V.I.P. Bots to interact with), the Dual Speeder garage and Astro's outfit collection (where Astro can repaint his speeder or change outfits), and the Safari Park (where Astro can view and interact with various robotic animals, as well as unlock Photo Mode).

Collecting every puzzle piece and 300 Bots grants access to one final level known as "Great Master Challenge", which is only accessible from the Crash Site. Completing this level rewards the player with a V.I.P. Bot based on Chop Chop Master Onion from PaRappa the Rapper, a low-polygon Astro costume called the "Throwback Outfit" (in reference to how 3D models looked on the original PlayStation) and a Dual Speeder skin based on the original PlayStation controller.

== Plot ==
Astro, the robot captain of a mothership resembling the PlayStation 5 console, and his crew of Bots are exploring space when a green alien named Space Bully Nebulax attacks them and rips out the mothership's CPU. An unconscious Astro and the mothership crash-land onto a desert planet while his crew and the mothership's core systems are scattered across the universe.

Astro is revived by his Dual Speeder, a smaller spaceship resembling the DualSense controller, and together they begin reactivating satellites and exploring galaxies to rescue the crew and rebuild the mothership. The crew helps Astro gain access to Nebulax's minions, whom he defeats and recovers mothership parts from - the system memory from Mighty Chewy the gorilla, the solid state drive from Wako Tako the octopus, the graphics processing unit from Lady Venomara the snake, the cooling fan from Mecha Leon the chameleon, and the ship covers from Falcon McFly the bird. Along the way, he rescues V.I.P. Bots (guest characters from other games) and explores planets based on Ape Escape, God of War, Uncharted, LocoRoco, and Horizon.

Once all parts save for the CPU have been recovered, Astro and his crew board ships based on older PlayStation hardware and form the "PlaySquadron" to take the fight to Nebulax, who has been harassing the helpless CPU throughout the game. Astro recovers the CPU, but when he and his crew defeat Nebulax by blowing up the spaceship he is attached to, it creates a black hole that begins to suck Nebulax in. Nebulax grabs Astro to try to take him down with him, but the crew take hold of Astro to try to pull him back. Refusing to let the crew sacrifice themselves for him, Astro lets go of them and falls into the black hole, which explodes into a supernova.

The crew mourns Astro and sad credits begin to roll, but are interrupted by a broken Astro falling back onto the mothership. Several Bots from the crew find replacement parts and help the mothership's repair systems rebuild their captain, who springs back to life. The crew celebrates with a revived Astro, who departs once more on his Dual Speeder before the credits start to roll again.

Once the actual credits finish rolling, a badly beaten Nebulax and his minions are seen floating through space; they threaten the player, but are sent flying by the sudden appearance of the words "THE END".

== Development ==
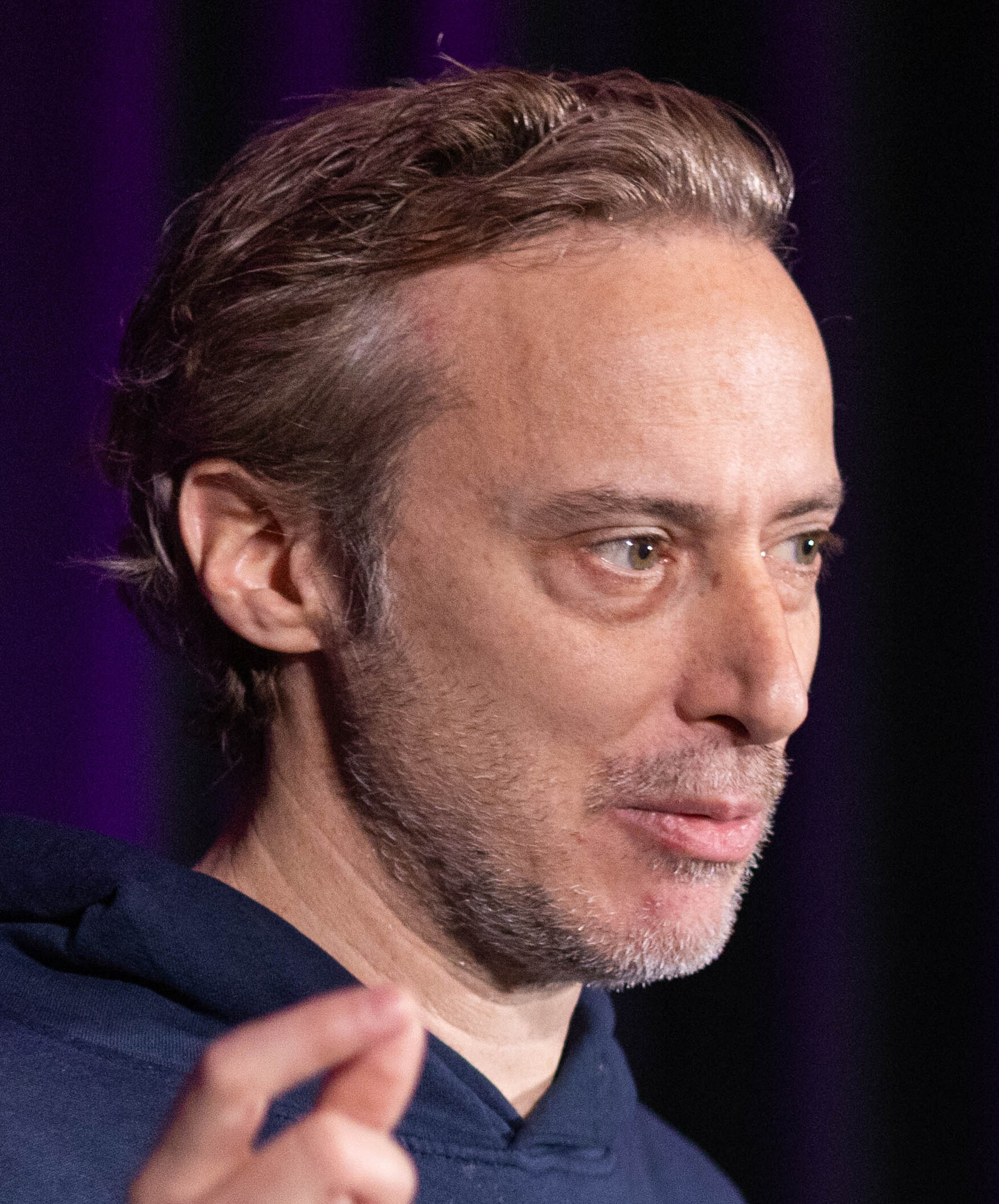
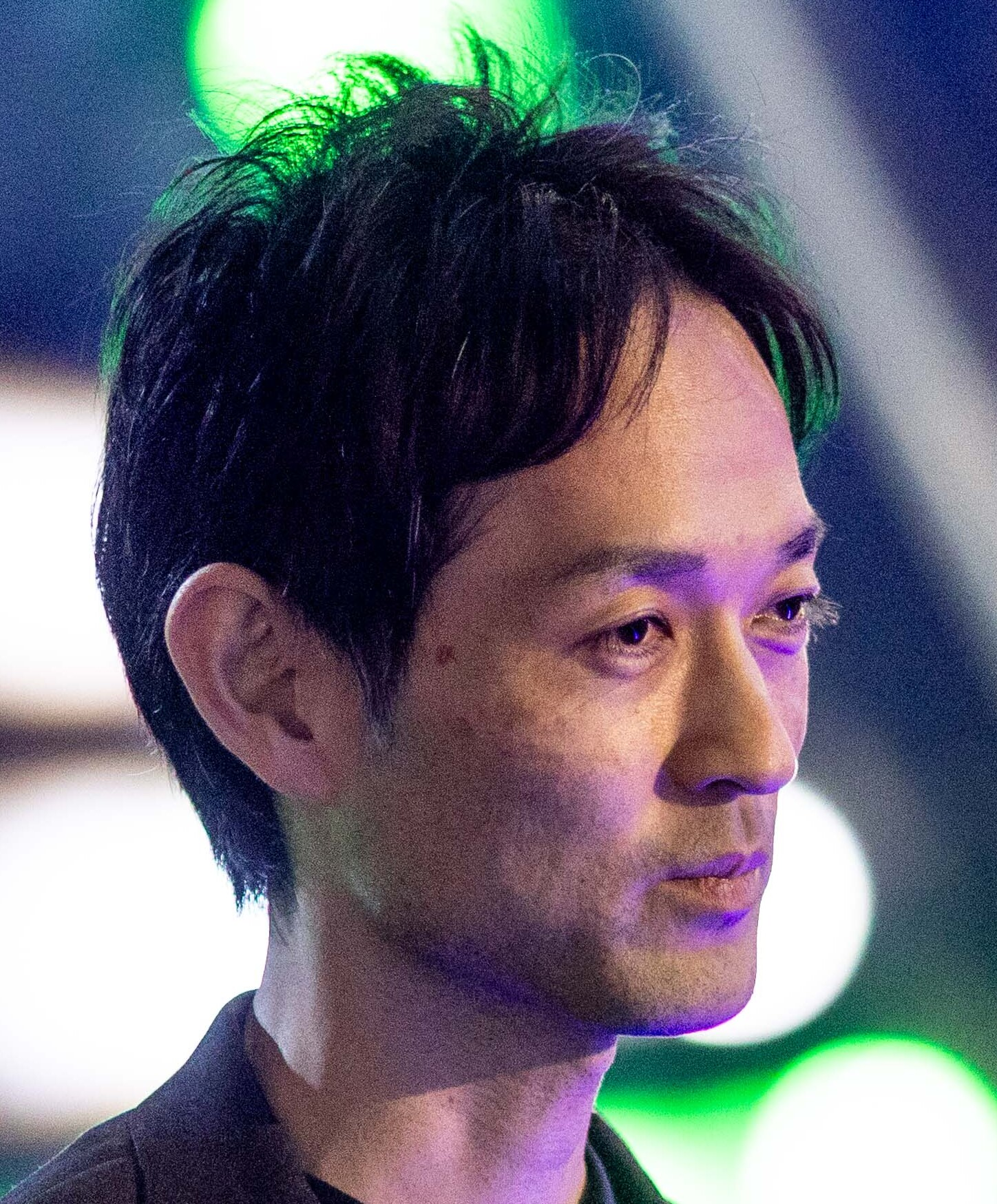
Astro Bot director Nicolas Doucet (left) and gameplay programming lead Masayuki Yamada (right)

Development of Astro Bot started almost immediately after Astro's Playroom was completed, and took roughly three years with a development team of around 60 people. It is reportedly the largest game that Team Asobi has developed. Unlike its predecessors Astro Bot Rescue Mission and Astro's Playroom, Astro Bot was named without any subtitle succeeding it. Nicolas Doucet, the creative director and producer of Astro Bot, stated the reasoning behind this was to signify a new beginning for the Astro Bot series.

In an interview with Edge magazine, Doucet stated that he and Team Asobi considered giving the game an open world structure, but ultimately decided on focusing more on a level-based structure instead. He notes that the reason behind this decision was "because that was the one that gave us the most control over the game's variety." To make the game accessible for gamers of all skill levels, the difficulty of each of Astro Bot's levels were put into great consideration. The main levels were designed to be relatively easy, allowing anyone to beat the game regardless of their skill level. The optional levels, meanwhile, were designed to be much more difficult as a way of satisfying the more experienced gaming crowd. In another article with Variety, Doucet spoke about how Team Asobi was able to implement ideas which previously went unused in Playroom. He specifically highlights a chainsaw demo which was deemed unfit due to the game's theming, stating "We had this really, really cool demo of a chainsaw, actually, where you could cut wood and it was classic, real-world expressions. And we felt like, OK, it's not really our content — we want it to be super friendly. But during 'Astro Bot,' as we were making the game and developing this richer story with rebuilding the mothership, we thought [...] maybe all of these DIY interactions that worked really well with the DualSense, that's a way to bring them back. And if we can add a sci-fi touch to them, we'll get away from them feeling maybe too real and a little bit too daunting."

Alongside the platforming, several additions were made to the background and environmental details present in each of the levels. The overhauled game engine allows for significant improvements in both the visuals and physics as well as over 70 unique species of wildlife (including polar bears, elephants, and small insects).

Astro Bot is not playable on the PlayStation VR2, even though previous Team Asobi games featuring Astro (such as Astro Bot Rescue Mission and The Playroom VR) required the use of the PlayStation VR accessory to be played. Doucet stated that Team Asobi had never considered developing a PlayStation VR2 game after finishing Astro's Playroom, instead opting to develop a larger scale version of the tech demo assuming that it was received well enough by the general public. He acknowledged that, while there are games that are playable in both VR and non-VR, this design philosophy could not work for an Astro Bot game, stating "for a game like Astro, if you were to make a VR version, it has to be fully designed for that medium. And if it's not a VR version, it has to be fully designed for that medium." Doucet further corroborated this viewpoint in an interview with MinnMax, stating that developing a PSVR 2 version of Astro Bot would make it an entirely different game. He also noted in the same interview that a PC port was a possibility, should it be in high enough demand following the game's release.

=== DualSense features ===
Astro Bot implements many of the DualSense controller's features in gameplay, particularly the haptic feedback and the adaptive triggers. To make the most out of DualSense, Team Asobi formed a small group solely dedicated to getting as much out of the controller as possible. Doucet notes a few examples of these features, which included using the adaptive triggers to simulate squeezing water out of a sponge by changing its resistance level and using the haptic feedback to feel certain irregularities on a surface to uncover a hidden secret. Many features are first developed in isolation before the best ones become integrated into the main game (with the aforementioned sponge ability being one such example).

Each of Astro's abilities also utilize the DualSense controller's features heavily. Doucet notes the difference in how Astro's Playroom and Astro Bot went about implementing the DualSense abilities in gameplay, with the former segmenting the platforming and abilities into different sections, and the latter instead opting to integrate the abilities into the platforming gameplay. He also mentions that, because of the stronger emphasis on platforming during development, touchpad-related gameplay mechanics were utilized much less frequently. The reason for this, as stated by Doucet, was because using the touchpad requires the player to move their fingers away from the jump button, thus creating friction during gameplay.

=== V.I.P. Bots ===
Astro Bot alongside other V.I.P. Bots, referencing various characters from PlayStation's history. The characters (from left to right) are Atreus of God of War; Kulche of LocoRoco; Kratos of God of War; Spike of Ape Escape; Aloy of Horizon; and Nathan Drake of Uncharted.

Doucet has mentioned the significance of the V.I.P. Bots referencing prominent PlayStation IPs on multiple occasions. He and Team Asobi decided to "double down" from the number of cameos present in Astro's Playroom. One of the reasons behind this decision was how Astro Bot could be used as a generational bridge; a child wondering who a certain Bot is referencing could receive an explanation from their parent who had played the games previously.

One challenge that implementing the V.I.P. Bots presented was how the team had gone about representing these longstanding characters. Punching the Bots causes them to have a funny reaction and reference something specific from their respective games, a mechanic carried over from Astro's Playroom. Doucet noted that there's a balance between maintaining this aspect of humor present in the previous Astro games while simultaneously being respectful to the legacy of the characters they were "taking the piss and being funny with". Various PlayStation Studios studios, such as Santa Monica Studio and Naughty Dog, responded positively to the implementation of their characters being represented as Bots. However, John Garvin (creative director behind Days Gone) repremended Deacon St. John's appearance in the game, claiming it "reduced [him] to a cartoon schill promoting some small game.”

Another challenge that came about from the V.I.P. Bots was how the large number of PlayStation and third-party characters and references present could overshadow the identity of Astro himself. Doucet said he and Team Asobi had considered not implementing any PlayStation branding in the upcoming game, instead allowing Astro to "stand on his own feet". Ultimately, he and Team Asobi decided against this, reasoning that fans of Astro's Playroom who enjoyed the PlayStation references would likely be disappointed if the sequel had done away with them entirely.

The design of the Bots was not always completely accurate to the source material they were referencing, with Doucet specifically noting that characters who had hair often had it replaced with vinyl. Doucet also said that the blue LED eyes present on the Bots were a huge element of their designs. Some Bots could not be accurately represented with LED eyes alone, due to their original designs heavily relying on more stylized eyes. To solve this issue, these Bots were provided full head masks, providing them with a shaped head more akin to the character they were referencing without significantly changing their anatomy.

There are a total of 194 V.I.P. Bots in Astro Bot. Aside from characters from Sony-owned franchises like Ratchet (Ratchet & Clank) and Sackboy (LittleBigPlanet), many characters from third-party franchises with notable appearances on PlayStation consoles also appear as V.I.P. Bots, which include Solid Snake (Metal Gear), Leon S. Kennedy (Resident Evil) and Joker (Persona).

=== Music ===
Kenneth C. M. Young, having previously composed the music for Astro Bot Rescue Mission and Astro's Playroom, returned to compose the soundtrack for Astro Bot. This was first confirmed through a post from his Twitter account. The soundtrack was made available to listen on the game's release through the digital deluxe edition of the game, and was later released on streaming services such as Spotify, Apple Music and Tidal on October 5, 2024. In addition to new music composed by Young, songs originating from The Playroom VR (2016), Astro Bot Rescue Mission (2018) and Astro's Playroom (2020) are reused in several of the game's levels.

Astro Bot also includes remixed versions of Greg Edmonson's themes from the Uncharted series, Bear McCreary's themes from God of War (2018) and God of War Ragnarök (2022), Nobuyuki Shimizu and Kemmei Adachi's themes from LocoRoco (the two going uncredited), and Joris de Man and Niels van der Leest's themes from the Horizon series. These themes are used in levels based on their respective franchises. The track "Rising Blue Lightning" from Thunder Force V: Perfect System (1998), originally composed by Hyakutaro Tsukumo, is also used in the level "PlaySquadron Go!".

Young went into detail regarding the composition process in an interview with VGC. Unconventionally for a composer, Young was given a dev kit, allowing him to access an earlier build of the game to get inspiration for level songs. He described it as "really important, particularly for those levels where it's not clear exactly what it needs". The "tropes" of a level also played a role in determining the difficulty of composing a track; where a fire-themed level would, in Young's eyes, use Heavy metal music, it was more difficult for him to parse a specific trope for the level Bubbling Under.

Young highlights being stuck on composing music for the level "Papa Tree", in which he was requested to write a song with lyrics (much like the song which plays in Playroom's GPU world), but was unsure what angle to approach it from. Another challenge which arose from composition came from how to represent the existing IPs in their dedicated levels, having to strike a balance between referencing the series' themes without straying too far from the conventions of Astro Bot's music. Young explained that series such as Uncharted and Horizon feature "big, old, sprawling themes that have multiple sections that are there. So that's why those ones are a little bit more faithful to those melodies, because if you cut those up, it just stops being Uncharted, it stops being Horizon."

The reception of Astro Bot's remixes from the original composers was positive. Young notes that Julie Elvin (the singer behind the Horizon series) and Joris de Man (one of Horizon's composers) were respectively "thrilled" and "pleased" with the remixes. In a separate VGC article, Bear McCreary expressed much enthusiasm over the God Of War remix, saying “I had a chance to tell Team Asobi to their face how much I love their game [...] I met them the day they came into town for The Game Awards. I loved it. I loved the level." One of the aspects which he appreciated about Young's remix was that it had allowed him to listen his music in a completely different context. "What Kenny did for me is that when I got to the Bot of War level, and you heard those three notes, it doesn't matter that they were completely recontextualized, it didn't matter that they had been redone in this fun, robo-electro-pop style. When you hear those three notes, that's God of War”

Young's favorite song in the soundtrack is Casino, specifically detailing his appreciation for retro aethethics and how he did his best to include them in the song.

== Marketing and release ==
Astro Bot was announced on May 30, 2024, during Sony's State of Play livestream presentation. The game's release trailer and a behind-the-scenes video (Note: Four additional behind-the-scenes videos were released later.) were showcased on the PlayStation YouTube channel on August 30, 2024. The game was released exclusively for the PlayStation 5 on September 6, 2024, coincidentally on the day Concord shut down its servers. The 400th issue of Edge features ten front cover variants, each highlighting a different V.I.P. Bot, such as Ratchet and Clank from their eponymous series and Aloy from the Horizon series.

Three versions of the game are available for purchase, those being the digital standard edition, physical standard edition, and digital deluxe editions. Each of these versions also come with rewards for preordering the game. The digital standard version comes with an in-game outfit for Astro resembling the character PaRappa the Rapper, a Dual Speeder graffiti skin featuring a variety of different V.I.P. Bots, and two different PlayStation Network avatars: one featuring Astro and the other being a V.I.P. Bot referencing PaRappa. (Note: The physical standard edition contains a poster alongside all the pre-order rewards from the digital standard edition.) The digital deluxe version, alongside featuring all of the rewards in the digital standard release, also adds two outfits (one is a golden outfit and the other references the Yharnam hunter from Bloodborne), two controller skins (one called 'Neon Dream' and the other 'Champion's Gold'), 10 PlayStation Network avatars (showcasing more renders of Astro and various V.I.P. Bots), and a download code for the official soundtrack and digital art gallery.

Kiosks featuring a playable demo of Astro Bot were present at Summer Game Fest, EVO, ChinaJoy, and PAX West. Astro Bot was also present during Tokyo Game Show which, alongside the aforementioned playable demo, featured a giant replica Gatcha machine. Anyone who used the machine received one of four different Astro Bot themed t-shirts.

A DualSense controller modeled after the Dual Speeder was announced on July 29, 2024. Pre-orders started on August 9 and the controller release coincided with the game. A console bundle including a PlayStation 5 console (standard and digital-only) and a digital copy of Astro Bot was released on March 13, 2025, in the United States and Europe.

=== Tie-in with Astro's Playroom ===
To help connect Astro Bot to its predecessor, Astro's Playroom received a free content update on June 7, 2024. It added extra artifacts to the Gatcha machine which corresponded to the PS5 slim models and various PlayStation 5 accessories, such as the PlayStation VR2 headset and the PlayStation Portal. Each of these artifacts could be stored in a new room accessed through the PlayStation Labo room. It also contained a brand new "mission room", which displayed a countdown until Astro Bot's release and directed players to the game's official store page.

Additionally, four new Bots could be rescued: one for each of the worlds present. These Bots reference the PlayStation characters Lady Maria from Bloodborne, Selene from Returnal, a racer from the Gran Turismo series, and a Pipo Monkey from the Ape Escape series. Each of the Bots collected in Playroom can be transferred to the Astro Bot ensemble.

=== Downloadable content ===
Following its release, Astro Bot received multiple updates which included new levels and V.I.P. Bots, among a number of other minor additions.

On September 24, 2024, during a State of Play event, five additional speedrun levels were included in a new galaxy titled Stellar Speedway, accessible upon the completion of the main campaign. The levels were released once per week, from October 17, 2024, to November 14, 2024. Each level contained two V.I.P. Bots, referencing characters such as the Shock Troopers from Helldivers 2, and Eve from Stellar Blade.

On December 11, 2024, in a post by PlayStation blog, a Christmas-themed level called Winter Wonder was announced and was released the following day. This level featured seven V.I.P. Bots referencing characters such as Croc, Tomba and Rayman from their eponymous series'. In addition, a variety of different collectibles could also be collected, being four new dual speeder skins and four new outfits.

On February 13, 2025, in a post by PlayStation blog, five challenge levels were included in a new galaxy titled Vicious Void. Similarly to the speedrun levels, they were released weekly from February 13, 2025, to March 13, 2025. Each level contained a single V.I.P Bot, referencing characters such as Heihachi Mishima from the Tekken series and Jade from Beyond Good & Evil. In addition to the new levels, the update also included enhanced features for the PS5 Pro.

On June 4, 2025, during a State of Play event, five challenge levels were announced and later released on July 10, 2025. Unlike previous updates, the levels were not released on a weekly basis (instead being released simultaneously) and were not added to a brand new galaxy (instead being included to the already existing Vicious Void galaxy). Each level contained a single V.I.P Bot, referencing characters such as 2B from Nier: Automata, and Cloud Strife from Final Fantasy VII.

=== Merchandise ===
Astro Bot has received a variety of merchandise. This includes figurines produced by Funko, Good Smile Company, and Youtooz, plushies and a vinyl soundtrack release produced by Fangamer, keychains produced by Faithful, and jackets and socks produced by Insert Coin. In addition, Astro has also been prominently featured in various soft drink advertisements, such as in a commercial for Red Bull and on various Pepsi bottles in Asia.

== Reception ==
Reception

Aggregate scores
Aggregator	Score
Metacritic	94/100
OpenCritic	99% recommended

Review scores
Publication	Score
Destructoid	9/10
Edge	10/10
Eurogamer	5/5
Famitsu	36/40
Game Informer	10/10
GameSpot	9/10
GamesRadar+	5/5
IGN	9/10
Push Square	10/10
The Guardian	5/5
VG247	5/5

=== Critical reception ===
Astro Bot received "universal acclaim" from critics, according to review aggregator website Metacritic, and 99% of critics recommended the game, according to OpenCritic. It was ranked the highest-rated game of 2024 on Metacritic and OpenCritic. In Japan, four critics from Famitsu gave the game a total score of 36 out of 40, with each critic awarding the game a 9 out of 10.

Simon Cardy of IGN compared Astro Bot to the likes of a theme park and Willy Wonka's Chocolate Factory, "throwing a new thrill at you around every corner and after every double-jumped gap [...] a delightful concoction of experimentation and joy." He also felt that it was the best utilization of the DualSense's haptic feedback and adaptive triggers since 2020's Astro's Playroom, describing it as if "some popping candy has smuggled its way into your controller [...] fizzes and pings away, sweetly reacting to whatever is happening on screen."

GameSpot's Mark Delaney praised the level design, feeling it could reliably predict when players would sidetrack from the main path and accordingly rewarded them with secrets, "like a surprise gift in the mail whose sender can't wait to learn it's arrived." Delaney also wrote the various abilities of Astro elevated the gameplay, but never at the cost of alienating the player from that fundamental sense of control. However, he did also describe Astro's underwater controls as unintuitive.

Astro Bot was also positively compared to games in the Super Mario series, particularly Super Mario Sunshine, Super Mario Galaxy, and Super Mario Odyssey. Critics also drew comparison of the mechanics to other Nintendo series, which included Arms, Pikmin, and Splatoon. Masahiro Sakurai, the creator and longtime director of games in the Kirby and Super Smash Bros. series, praised the game on Twitter.

Astro Bot received criticism for its purported lack of innovation and the way it utilized the likeness of video game characters and series. In an article published by Kotaku, Cole Kronman wrote that, while he found the game to be enjoyable and exceedingly polished, it ultimately did very little which separated itself from the platformers it was heavily inspired by. By contrast, an article written by James Lucas for TheGamer compared the game to a "graveyard", claiming that referencing certain series so prominently only highlights how long it has been since their last entries.

=== Sales ===
In the United States, Astro Bot was the second best-selling software in the week of release and 21% higher than Ratchet & Clank: Rift Apart's debut in the United Kingdom. In Japan, the game sold 12,672 physical units throughout its first week of release, making it the second best-selling retail game of the week in the country. It had sold 34,902 physical units in Japan by September 30, 2024, and 47,392 physical units by December 8.

On November 8, 2024, Sony announced that Astro Bot had sold 1.5 million units as of November 3. By June 2026, Astro Bot had sold approximately 4.3 million copies worldwide, generating around $250 million in revenue. Between January and June 2026, the game sold more than 600,000 copies and generated nearly $33 million in revenue.

=== Awards ===
As of April 9, 2025, Astro Bot beat out It Takes Two for the title of the most awarded platformer game of all time, with a current total of 195 Game of the Year nominations and wins.

Year	Award	Category	Result	Ref.
2024	2024 Golden Joystick Awards	Best Visual Design	Nominated	
2024	2024 Golden Joystick Awards	Best Audio Design	Won	
2024	2024 Golden Joystick Awards	Best Soundtrack	Nominated	
2024	2024 Golden Joystick Awards	Studio of the Year	Won	
2024	2024 Golden Joystick Awards	Console Game of the Year	Nominated	
2024	2024 Golden Joystick Awards	Ultimate Game of the Year	Nominated	
2024	Equinox Latam Game Awards	Game of the Year	Nominated	
2024	Equinox Latam Game Awards	Best PlayStation Game	Won	
2024	Equinox Latam Game Awards	Best Family Game	Won	
2024	Equinox Latam Game Awards	Best Platformer	Won	
2024	Equinox Latam Game Awards	Best Art Direction	Nominated	
2024	Equinox Latam Game Awards	Best Audio Design	Nominated	
2024	Titanium Awards	Game of the Year	Won	
2024	Titanium Awards	Best Game Design	Nominated	
2024	Titanium Awards	Best Art Direction	Nominated	
2024	Titanium Awards	Best Sound Direction	Nominated	
2024	The Game Awards 2024	Game of the Year	Won	
2024	The Game Awards 2024	Best Game Direction	Won	
2024	The Game Awards 2024	Best Art Direction	Nominated	
2024	The Game Awards 2024	Best Score and Music	Nominated	
2024	The Game Awards 2024	Best Audio Design	Nominated	
2024	The Game Awards 2024	Best Action / Adventure Game	Won	
2024	The Game Awards 2024	Best Family Game	Won	
2025	New York Game Awards	Best Game of the Year	Won	
2025	New York Game Awards	Best World	Nominated	
2025	New York Game Awards	Best Music in a Game	Won	
2025	New York Game Awards	Best Kids Game	Won	
2025	28th Annual D.I.C.E. Awards	Game of the Year	Won	
2025	28th Annual D.I.C.E. Awards	Family Game of the Year	Won	
2025	28th Annual D.I.C.E. Awards	Outstanding Achievement in Game Design	Won	
2025	28th Annual D.I.C.E. Awards	Outstanding Achievement in Animation	Won	
2025	28th Annual D.I.C.E. Awards	Outstanding Achievement in Original Music Composition	Nominated	
2025	28th Annual D.I.C.E. Awards	Outstanding Technical Achievement	Won	
2025	Famitsu Dengeki Game Awards 2024	MVC (Best Game Developer/Studio) ("Team ASOBI")	Nominated	
2025	Famitsu Dengeki Game Awards 2024	Action	Won	
2025	Famitsu Dengeki Game Awards 2024	Character ("Astro")	Nominated	
2025	Game Audio Network Guild Awards	Audio of the Year	Won (Note: Tied with Need for Speed Mobile)	
2025	Game Audio Network Guild Awards	Best Game Music Cover ("Bot of War" - Kenneth CM Young)	Nominated	
2025	Game Audio Network Guild Awards	Best Game Trailer Audio	Nominated	
2025	Game Audio Network Guild Awards	Best UI, Reward, or Objective Sound Design	Won	
2025	Game Audio Network Guild Awards	Creative and Technical Achievement in Music	Nominated	
2025	Game Audio Network Guild Awards	Creative and Technical Achievement in Sound Design	Nominated	
2025	Game Audio Network Guild Awards	Sound Design of the Year	Nominated	
2025	Game Developers Choice Awards	Best Audio	Won	
2025	Game Developers Choice Awards	Best Design	Nominated	
2025	Game Developers Choice Awards	Innovation Award	Nominated	
2025	Game Developers Choice Awards	Best Technology	Won	
2025	Game Developers Choice Awards	Best Visual Art	Nominated	
2025	Game Developers Choice Awards	Social Impact Award	Nominated	
2025	Game Developers Choice Awards	Game of the Year	Nominated	
2025	NAVGTR Awards 2024	Camera Direction in a Game Engine	Won	
2025	NAVGTR Awards 2024	Control Design, 3D	Won	
2025	NAVGTR Awards 2024	Control Precision	Won	
2025	NAVGTR Awards 2024	Game, Franchise Family	Won	
2025	NAVGTR Awards 2024	Graphics, Technical	Won	
2025	21st British Academy Games Awards	Best Game	Won	
2025	21st British Academy Games Awards	Animation	Won	
2025	21st British Academy Games Awards	Artistic Achievement	Nominated	
2025	21st British Academy Games Awards	Audio Achievement	Won	
2025	21st British Academy Games Awards	Family	Won	
2025	21st British Academy Games Awards	Game Design	Won	
2025	21st British Academy Games Awards	Music	Nominated	
2025	21st British Academy Games Awards	Technical Achievement	Nominated	
2025	GEM Awards	GEM of the Year 2024	4th place	
2025	GEM Awards	Best Art Direction	Nominated	
2025	GEM Awards	Best Soundtrack	Nominated	
2025	GEM Awards	Best Game for All Audiences	Won	
2025	GEM Awards	Best Platform Game	Won	
2025	GEM Awards	Best Exclusive Game (Console)	Won	
2025	GEM Awards	Best Protagonist/Lead Actor	Nominated	
2025	Develop:Star Awards	Best Game	Nominated	
2025	Develop:Star Awards	Best Audio	Nominated	
2025	Develop:Star Awards	Best Game Design	Won	
2025	Develop:Star Awards	Best Technical Innovation	Won	
2025	Develop:Star Awards	Best Studio (Team ASOBI)	Nominated	
2025	TIGA Awards	Action and Adventure	Nominated	
2025	TIGA Awards	Arcade	Won	
2025	TIGA Awards	Visual Design	Nominated	
2025	TIGA Awards	Large Studio (Team ASOBI)	Nominated	
2025	TIGA Awards	Technical Innovation (Sony Interactive Entertainment)	Nominated	
