= Tearaway (video game) =

2013 video game

- The game includes reversible box art featuring the male character on one side (shown above) and the female character on the other.
- Developer: Media Molecule
- Publisher: Sony Computer Entertainment
- Designers: Rex Crowle; David Smith; Swann Martin-Raget; Christophe Villedieu; John Beech; Victor Agren; Daniel Leaver
- Artists: Rex Crowle; Jon Eckersley; Lluis Danti; Stefan Kamoda; Mike Pang
- Composers: Kenneth C M Young; Brian D'Oliveira
- Platform: PlayStation Vita
- Release: AU: 20 November 2013; EU: 22 November 2013; NA: 22 November 2013
- Genres: Platformer, adventure
- Mode: Single-player

Tearaway is a platform adventure video game developed by Media Molecule and published by Sony Computer Entertainment for the PlayStation Vita. The game was announced at Gamescom on 15 August 2012 and released on 20 November 2013 in Australia, on 22 November in Europe, North America and India, and 5 December 2013 in Japan. The game is inspired by papercraft and Rex Crowle's drawings and doodles left around Media Molecule's office. It received positive reviews from critics.

An expanded remake of the game, titled Tearaway Unfolded, was released for the PlayStation 4 on 8 September 2015.

== Gameplay ==
Players use the rear touch panel to give the effect of pushing their fingers through the game world.

Tearaway is a third-person platform game which utilises almost all of the PlayStation Vita's features in some way. In one example demonstrated in the game's announce trailer, the player encounters an elk who needs a new skin. The player is able to take a picture using the PS Vita's camera and have it applied to the papercraft animal. In a gameplay demo at Gamescom, Media Molecule demonstrated how the player is also able to use the PS Vita's rear touch panel to effectively push their fingers up through the ground to interact with enemies and the environment. The player is also capable of customizing Iota or Atoi by drawing designs on virtual paper, cutting them out, and applying them to their character. In another part of the demo, the player draws on the touchscreen with their finger to cut-out a paper crown for a character in the game. The player can use an in-game camera to collect various papercraft designs, and can assist non-player characters in exchange for confetti, the game's currency.

== Plot ==
The game opens with two characters (the "Green Man" and an unnamed Fortune Teller) introducing themselves to the player (referred to as the "You"). They inform the You that the world they occupy is a papercraft world called "ValleyFold," full of "stories" that they have grown tired of hearing. They enlist the You to help them create a new story. The Green Man and the Fortune Teller connect their world with the You's, blowing a hole in ValleyFold's sun to send an envelope through. The invitation falls through the hole, landing in a field in ValleyFold. The envelope then becomes a papercraft humanoid (Iota or Atoi, depending on the You's choice) with the envelope as their head, referred to as the "Messenger."

After introducing the Messenger and the You to each other, the Green Man creates the "Scraps", intended to be the enemy of the story. The Scraps attack the Messenger, forcing the You to save them. Following this, the Green Man informs the Messenger to head for the sun and deliver a message to the You. The You helps the Messenger navigate through a now Scrap-infested ValleyFold, and assist the people living there via helping them complete a ceremony involving apple-picking in an Orchard by defeating the nearby Scraps. The people then tell the Messenger to go to Gibbet Hill, a mountain that has a gigantic catapult which can help them reach the sun. Enlisting a Scarecrow pumpkin head for help, the Messenger makes their way up Gibbet Hill, the You assisting them all the while. After reaching the top, however, the Messenger finds that the sun is facing the opposite direction of the catapult, forcing the You to turn the mountain so that it faces the sun, much to the Messenger's marvel. The Messenger is then launched towards the sun on the Catapult.

However, just as the Messenger reaches the sun, the Fortune Teller, having "heard [that story] before," causes a Scrap to jump at the Messenger, forcing them to crash land on SogPort, an island that was once a part of ValleyFold that suffers from constant earthquakes. After crashing into the forest of SogPort, the Messenger encounters a baby Wendigo, a species of apex predator in SogPort, being chased by a group of Scraps. After defeating them, the baby Wendigo joins them. However, much to the Messenger's horror, the baby Wendigo is kidnapped by the Scraps just before they enter SogPort's main town. The Messenger finds the Fortune Teller in a tavern, who tells them to head to the opposite side of the island, apparently being the location of the source of the earthquakes, promising to put the messenger back on their course to the sun if they do. After navigating through a valley of Wendigos, the Messenger discovers a scientific facility, which is quickly overrun by Scraps. The Messenger makes their way to the head scientist's office, where she starts to inform the Messenger about the source of the earthquakes. However, just as she is about to explain, the Scraps cause a cave-in on the floor of the office, and the Messenger falls into a series of caverns. There, the Messenger finds the Scraps' apparent headquarters.

After rescuing the baby Wendigo from a nearby cage, the Messenger reunites the baby with its mother, who then leaves with the baby, much to the Fortune Teller's delight. Finding out that the Scraps' drilling operations are causing the earthquakes, the Messenger then heads to the lair's center, where they find a massive drill and captured scientists. The scientists inform the Messenger that they can use the drill to escape the lair, and that they need help getting to it. After some assistance from the You, the scientists and the Messenger are brought near the drill. However, the Scraps then try to attack the drill, forcing the Messenger and the You to fight them off. They are nearly overwhelmed until the mother Wendigo steps in and helps fight them back. They ultimately succeed, liberating the entire papercraft world from the Scraps, having defeated every last one. After celebrating with the scientists, the Messenger takes the drill and rides to the surface, not before being warned that the drill is powerful enough to take them "outside the known universe".

The drill then takes them to "Between the Pages", a manifestation of the Green Man and the Fortune Teller's collective ideas on where to take the story next. After some thinking, the Green Man and the Fortune Teller decide to "Wing It," and put the Messenger and the You in a desert. After some traveling, the Messenger finds a gigantic caravan. Before entering it, however, the Messenger is informed by the Green Man that it will be "weird" in the caravan, but tells them to proceed regardless. Proceeding through the caravan, they find an abandoned Messenger, their You having abandoned them. They then free the abandoned Messenger, destroying the caravan in the process. After being encouraged to by the Green Man, the Messenger jumps off of a cliff and lands in the Grand Tear, a mountainous landscape with psychedelic imagery and faceless characters. After entering a portal, the Messenger arrives at "The You," a landscape that displays the Messenger's achievements throughout their journey. The Messenger then enters another portal, taking them to the You's world, and the sun.

While initially happy to see the You, the Messenger sadly and silently realizes that the sun will stay open forever, leaving ValleyFold susceptible to more potential Scrap attacks if they remain with the You. The Messenger sacrifices themself to seal the hole in the sun, leaving behind the contents of their envelope head, the message that was supposed to be delivered to the You. The game ends with the You reading the message that was delivered, revealing it to be a retelling of the game through the Messenger's perspective.

== Development ==
During the early stages of development, Tearaway was called Sandpit and allowed players to roam freely. As such, most of the game's code still refers to itself as Sandpit. Additionally, the male protagonist Iota was originally named Oola and looked different from the female protagonist Atoi.

== Reception ==
Reception

Aggregate scores
Aggregator	Score
GameRankings	87.52%
Metacritic	87/100

Review scores
Publication	Score
Computer and Video Games	9/10
Destructoid	10/10
Edge	9/10
Eurogamer	8/10
GameSpot	8/10
Giant Bomb	4/5
IGN	9.3/10
Hardcore Gamer	3.5/5

Awards
Publication	Award
BAFTA	Best Family Game
BAFTA	Best Mobile & Handheld
BAFTA	Best Artistic Achievement

Tearaway was well received by critics, who praised its art style, creativity and inventive use of the PlayStation Vita's numerous inputs and sensors. The Sixth Axis said, "The PS Vita's various input devices are put to quite fantastic use throughout". IGN's Daniel Krupa described Tearaway as "a simple story, told in a wonderful way", and called it "the best game I've played on the PlayStation Vita". Grant E. Gaines of Hardcore Gamer was slightly less positive, praising the title for its unique mechanics and art style but criticizing its short length. GameZone's Joe Donato wrote, "The game is so intrinsically designed with the Vita platform in mind that it's such a success... if you have a Vita you need to play it." In Japan, Famitsu gave the game a review score of 36/40.

Tearaway won Edge's 2013 award for best visual design in a game. The game received eight nominations in the categories of "Best Game", "Best British Game", "Best Family Game", "Best Mobile & Handheld Game", "Best Original Music", "Artistic Achievement", "Game Design" and "Game Innovation" for the 2014 BAFTA Video Games Awards; of these nominations, Tearaway won the awards for Best Mobile & Handheld Game, Best Artistic Achievement, and Best Family game. During the 17th Annual D.I.C.E. Awards, the Academy of Interactive Arts & Sciences nominated Tearaway for "Adventure Game of the Year", "Handheld Game of the Year", "Outstanding Innovation in Gaming", "Outstanding Achievement in Game Direction", and "Outstanding Achievement in Art Direction".

== Tearaway Unfolded ==
On 12 August 2014, a PlayStation 4 version, titled Tearaway Unfolded, was announced at Gamescom 2014. The game includes an extended storyline and enhanced gameplay using the features of the DualShock 4 controller. Tearaway Unfolded was released worldwide on 8 September 2015.
