= Astro Bot Rescue Mission =

2018 video game

- North American cover art
- Developer: Japan Studio
- Publisher: Sony Interactive Entertainment
- Director: Nicolas Doucet
- Producers: Nicolas Doucet; Teruyuki Toriyama
- Designer: Gento Morita
- Programmers: Takumi Yoshida; Yuki Miyamae
- Artists: Sebastian Brueckner; Jamie Smith
- Composer: Kenneth C. M. Young
- Series: Astro Bot
- Platform: PlayStation 4
- Release: WW: October 2, 2018; JP: October 4, 2018
- Genre: Platform
- Mode: Single-player

Astro Bot Rescue Mission is a 2018 virtual reality platform game developed and published by Sony Interactive Entertainment for the PlayStation 4's PlayStation VR headset. It stars a cast of robot characters first introduced in The Playroom and The Playroom VR. In the game, the player plays as Captain Astro, who aims to rescue his lost crew scattered across different worlds.

Astro Bot Rescue Mission was released on October 2, 2018 and received critical acclaim, with praise for the game's use of the DualShock 4 and its varied level design. It is the first main game in the Astro Bot series, and spawned a trilogy, with Astro's Playroom (2020) and Astro Bot (2024).

== Gameplay ==
Astro Bot Rescue Mission is a 3D platformer where players control Astro Bot, a small robot navigating various levels using a DualShock 4 controller. The game is designed for VR, so players experience the game world from a first-person perspective, essentially becoming a giant robot that interacts with the environment. This includes actions like smashing walls with head-butts, dodging attacks, and using the headset's microphone to blow petals around.

In each level, the main objective is to rescue Astro's crew, scattered throughout the game's five worlds and twenty levels. Players also face bosses at the end of each world, which require a certain number of rescued bots to challenge.

Each level also hides Space Chameleons, which, when found, unlock special challenge stages that add extra content to the game. Additionally, players can discover Magic Chests containing gadgets such as a Hook Shot, Water Gun, Tight Rope, Magic Light, Machine Gun, or a Slingshot. These gadgets help Astro navigate through levels, providing tools to manipulate the environment in various ways.

== Development ==
Astro Bot Rescue Mission was developed by Japan Studio's Team Asobi division. Due to popular demand and fan feedback of the mini game called "Robots Rescue" in The Playroom VR, Japan Studio decided to make a fully fleshed game based on the mini game. Astro Bot Rescue Mission was developed in 18 months by a team of 25 people. The music was composed by Kenneth C M Young.

== Reception ==
Reception

Aggregate score
Aggregator	Score
Metacritic	90/100

Review scores
Publication	Score
Computer Games Magazine	8.5/10
Destructoid	7.5/10
Edge	9/10
Game Informer	9/10
IGN	9/10
Jeuxvideo.com	17/20
PlayStation Official Magazine – UK	7/10
Road to VR	10/10
Metro	9/10
UploadVR	8.5/10

Astro Bot Rescue Mission received "universal acclaim" from critics, according to review aggregator website Metacritic. As of July 2019, Astro Bot Rescue Mission is the highest-rated VR game in history according to Metacritic, and the 6th highest-rated PS4 game in 2018. The game was especially praised for its use of the DualShock 4 controller's features and varied level design.

Chris Dunlap's 10/10 score on GamingAge stated that "Astro Bot Rescue Mission is an extremely fun and engaging game, and a dynamite addition to the growing PSVR library." PSU.com said "Easily the best platformer and PS VR game on the market this year."

=== Accolades ===
Year	Award	Category	Result	Ref.
2018	Game Critics Awards	Best VR/AR Game	Nominated	
2018	Gamescom 2018	Best Puzzle/Skill Game	Nominated	
2018	9th Hollywood Music in Media Awards	Best Original Song ("A Fire in Your Mind")	Nominated	
2018	The Game Awards 2018	Best VR/AR Game	Won	
2018	The Edge Awards 2018	VR Game of the Year	Won	
2018	The Edge Awards 2018	Game of the Year	5	
2019	New York Game Awards	Coney Island Dreamland Award for Best Virtual Reality Game	Nominated	
2019	22nd Annual D.I.C.E. Awards	Family Game of the Year	Nominated	
2019	22nd Annual D.I.C.E. Awards	Immersive Reality Game of the Year	Nominated	
2019	22nd Annual D.I.C.E. Awards	Immersive Reality Technical Achievement	Nominated	
2019	22nd Annual D.I.C.E. Awards	Outstanding Technical Achievement	Nominated	
2019	National Academy of Video Game Trade Reviewers Awards	Animation, Artistic	Nominated	
2019	National Academy of Video Game Trade Reviewers Awards	Control Design, VR	Nominated	
2019	National Academy of Video Game Trade Reviewers Awards	Direction in Virtual Reality	Nominated	
2019	National Academy of Video Game Trade Reviewers Awards	Game, Original Family	Nominated	
2019	National Academy of Video Game Trade Reviewers Awards	Sound Mixing in Virtual Reality	Nominated	
2019	National Academy of Video Game Trade Reviewers Awards	Use of Sound, New IP	Nominated	
2019	SXSW Gaming Awards	Excellence in Technical Achievement	Nominated	
2019	SXSW Gaming Awards	VR Game of the Year	Nominated	
2019	Game Developers Choice Awards	Best VR/AR Game	Nominated	
2019	15th British Academy Games Awards	Best Game	Nominated	
2019	15th British Academy Games Awards	Game Design	Nominated	
2019	15th British Academy Games Awards	Game Innovation	Nominated	
2019	Famitsu Awards	Special Award	Won	
2019	British Academy Children's Awards	Game	Won	
2019	Italian Video Game Awards	Innovation Award	Nominated	
2019	Japan Game Awards	Game Designers Award	Won	
2019	The Independent Game Developers' Association Awards	Best Arcade Game	Nominated	

== Sequels ==
=== Astro's Playroom ===
A sequel, Astro's Playroom, was released for the PlayStation 5 as a launch title that is pre-installed on every console and serves as a tech demo for the new DualSense controller.

=== Astro Bot ===
Astro Bot is the most recent entry in the Astro Bot series and was released in 2024 for the PlayStation 5 in celebration of PlayStation's 30th anniversary. The game received universal acclaim from critics.
