= Astro's Playroom =

2020 video game

- Developer: Japan Studio
- Publisher: Sony Interactive Entertainment
- Director: Nicolas Doucet
- Producer: Nicolas Doucet
- Designer: Gento Morita
- Programmer: Masayuki Yamada
- Artists: Sebastian Brueckner; Toshihiko Nakai
- Composer: Kenneth C. M. Young
- Series: Astro Bot
- Platform: PlayStation 5
- Release: November 12, 2020
- Genre: Platform
- Mode: Single-player

Astro's Playroom is a 2020 platform game developed and published by Sony Interactive Entertainment for the PlayStation 5. A sequel to Astro Bot Rescue Mission, the game comes pre-installed on every console, serving additionally as a free tech demo for the DualSense controller.

Astro's Playroom was announced on June 11, 2020, at the PlayStation 5 reveal event. The game was released on November 12, 2020 to generally favorable reviews from critics.

Astro's Playroom, alongside Demon's Souls, was the final game released by Japan Studio before their reorganization in April 1, 2021. The game's development group was formally spun-off into a new studio within Sony's PlayStation Studios in the same day. A full-length sequel, Astro Bot, was announced on May 30, 2024, and was released for the PlayStation 5 on September 6, 2024.

== Gameplay ==
Astro's Playroom is a 3D platformer in which the player controls the title character Astro Bot using the DualSense controller. Like the previous game, he is able to jump, hover, punch enemies and objects, as well as use a spin attack by charging his punch. The haptic feedback of the controller is used to provide realistic tactile vibrations from actions, such as walking on different types of material, like sand, walking through rainfall, and walking against the wind. The game starts in a hub world called CPU Plaza which is modeled after the inside of the PlayStation 5 console and provides access to four worlds which are each themed after a component of the console, and the artifacts are themed after the corresponding console: GPU Jungle (PlayStation 4 & PlayStation VR), Cooling Springs (PlayStation Portable, PlayStation 3, & PlayStation Vita), SSD Speedway (PlayStation 2 & PS2 Slim), and Memory Meadow (PlayStation, PocketStation & PSone). The plaza also houses two other areas: Network Speed Run, in which players can compete in unlockable time trials for the fastest time which can be shared to online leaderboards, and PlayStation Labo, which houses all of the collectables a player has collected.

Each of the four worlds are split up into four levels that are interconnected with each other. Two of these levels involve regular platforming whereas the other two involve a special power-up suit which makes use of the DualSense controller's capabilities. For example, one world features a frog suit with a spring at the bottom in which the controller must be tilted laterally to guide the frog and the trigger pressed down to compress the spring, which offers resistance similar to how a real spring would using the adaptive trigger system. Another example is the ball suit in which the player must swipe the touchpad to guide the ball. The worlds also contain large numbers of other robots performing various activities, including acting out scenes from various current and former PlayStation-exclusive game franchises, such as God of War and Resident Evil. In the worlds, there are cable wires that Astro Bot can pull to collect projectiles, coins, and artifacts, including other robots, with some on enemy robots. If Astro Bot falls or gets defeated, the level will restart from the latest checkpoint cleared.

Three types of collectables exist within each world: coins, puzzle pieces, and artifacts. Coins collected from collecting and defeating enemies can be used at a gacha machine in PlayStation Labo to potentially obtain collectable in-game figurines as well as more puzzle pieces and artifacts. Puzzle pieces are used to fill in a PlayStation mural that adorns the walls of the PlayStation Labo area. Finally, artifacts are 3D rendered representations of real-world objects from the history of PlayStation, such as consoles, controllers, and accessories. When collected, the player is able to examine them by moving the DualSense controller around and interact with them using the touchpad or built-in microphone. Artifacts are stored in PlayStation Labo where Astro Bot (and many other robots) can later interact with them by punching or jumping on them.

At the end of each world, there is an area inspired by the startup sequences of the previous four PlayStation home consoles, where the player receives an artifact of the respective console as a reward for completing the world. Once all four worlds have been completed, a secret fifth world opens up called 1994 Throwback, in which Astro Bot must complete a boss fight inspired by the T-Rex tech demo from the original PlayStation's first demo disc. Once the T-Rex has been defeated, the credits roll and the player is rewarded with artifacts from the PlayStation 5 era, including the DualSense controller and the PlayStation 5 console itself.

In anticipation for the release of Astro Bot, Astro's Playroom received several updates throughout 2024 to promote the upcoming launch. These include new gacha prizes that add new artifacts to the PlayStation Labo room for PlayStation 5 hardware released since the original release of Astro's Playroom (the slim model of the PlayStation 5, the DualSense Edge, Access controller, PlayStation Portal, and the PlayStation VR2 and its associated "Sense" controllers). These are stored in a new room below the PlayStation Labo room called the "Secret Labo". Within the Secret Labo, a portal to preorder Astro Bot can be found (prior to the launch of Astro Bot the portal led to a countdown to the midnight release of Astro Bot on Sept. 6). Additionally special "VIP bots" were hidden in each world that can be rescued by completing a specific series of actions unique to each bot. The VIP bots are themed around Gran Turismo, Returnal, The Old Hunters downloadable content for Bloodborne and Ape Escape, and will appear in the portal room when rescued. Furthermore, rescuing these bots will also make them available to rescue and add to the player's rescued bots at the crash site in Astro Bot.

== Development ==
Concept art of various characters referencing the Metal Gear, Resident Evil, and Devil May Cry franchises

Team Asobi began development on Astro's Playroom in early 2018. The game initially started as a series of tech demos for the PlayStation 5's DualSense controller, although its status as a launch title was not established until later in development. According to creative director Nicolas Doucet, at least 80 tech demos for the DualSense controller had been designed while working on the game.

As a celebration of the PlayStation brand, the game features appearances by characters from several PlayStation franchises, as well as characters from series by third-party developers, such as Bandai Namco Entertainment, Capcom, Square Enix, Konami, and Activision. Team Asobi consulted with the original developers, such as Tekken series producer Katsuhiro Harada, for the numerous easter eggs found in Astro's Playroom referencing the different video game franchises, In designing the cameos, concept artist Toshihiko Nakai focused on capturing recognizability, humor, and fan appeal. A number of animators at Team Asobi had previously worked on some original titles referenced in Astro's Playroom.

== Reception ==
Reception

Aggregate scores
Aggregator	Score
Metacritic	83/100
OpenCritic	91% recommend

Review scores
Publication	Score
Destructoid	7/10
Electronic Gaming Monthly	10/10
Eurogamer	Essential
Game Informer	8/10
GameSpot	8/10
IGN	8/10

Astro's Playroom received "generally favorable" reviews from critics, according to review aggregator website Metacritic. Fellow review aggregator OpenCritic assessed that the game received "mighty" approval, being recommended by 91% of critics.

In a highly positive review, Electronic Gaming Monthly's Mollie Patterson awarded the game a perfect score, lauding the variety of the gameplay and the game's nostalgia factor. She felt emotional finding all of Astro's Playroom secrets, writing "No matter your console or company allegiances, it's easy to forget just how much those 25 years of the PlayStation's existence as a gaming platform has meant for our hobby."

Destructoid's Chris Carter praised the gameplay as being a great showcase for the DualSense and the instant load times. Similarly, Eurogamer's Martin Robinson praised the game for being a promising glimpse of the future for the PlayStation 5 and remarked it as being "one of the best launch titles I can remember in an age."

The usage of cameos and references to various PlayStation and PlayStation-related franchises such as Uncharted, LittleBigPlanet and Crash Bandicoot was praised by Game Informer's Joe Juba, comparing their inclusion favorably to the various licensed Lego video games.

GameSpot's Mike Epstein enjoyed the game's visual fidelity and solid platforming, but was critical of the game's motion control sequences. Jonathon Dornbush, writing for IGN, enjoyed the game's homages to PlayStation's history and the DualSense interactions, but criticized how it felt more like a technical showcase than a full game.

During the 24th Annual D.I.C.E. Awards, the Academy of Interactive Arts & Sciences nominated Astro's Playroom for "Family Game of the Year".

== See also ==
- Astro Bot (series)
- Astro Bot Rescue Mission
