= Tearaway Unfolded =

2015 video game

- Cover art for the "Crafted Edition" of Tearaway Unfolded, featuring the female protagonist Atoi
- Developers: Media Molecule; Tarsier Studios
- Publisher: Sony Computer Entertainment
- Designer: Rex Crowle
- Composers: Kenneth C M Young; Brian D'Oliveira
- Platform: PlayStation 4
- Release: NA: September 8, 2015; EU: September 9, 2015; UK: September 11, 2015; JP: October 1, 2015
- Genres: Platformer, adventure
- Mode: Single-player

Tearaway Unfolded is a 2015 platform-adventure game developed by Media Molecule and Tarsier Studios and published by Sony Computer Entertainment for the PlayStation 4. Announced at Gamescom 2014, the game released worldwide in September 2015 (October in Japan), is an expanded remake of the 2013 PlayStation Vita game Tearaway, which had been originally developed by Media Molecule.

The game takes place in a vibrant storybook-type world made entirely out of paper. The player gains control of either Iota or Atoi, a messenger tasked with delivering a letter to a portal in the sky called 'the You', which has mysteriously been opened. Along the way, the messenger must save the world from Scraps, small villainous creatures which are invading the paper world via the opening to cause disruption.

Tearaway Unfolded's gameplay revolves around environmental platform interaction, creativity and customizability, confrontations with Scraps and other antagonistic creatures, mini-quests issued by non-playable characters, and finding collectibles. The player, who controls several aspects of the world in a god-like fashion, navigates the messenger through the environments by changing the landscape. For example, in order to help Iota/Atoi advance through a specific section, the player may have to trigger bounce pads, rotate platforms, illuminate objects, cast gusts of wind, or hurl objects, to trigger the solution and allow progression. The player is tasked with designing objects for use in the game's world, which are mostly used to solve people's problems or requests, but may also be used for decorative purposes. The messenger is given several helpful tools over the course of the game, which introduce new gameplay mechanics, and, among other things, allow for alternate methods of traversal.

Upon release, Tearaway Unfolded was met with a positive critical reception. Critics mostly praised the game's controls, visuals, characters, and world design. Some critics disliked the emphasis on optional controllers, while others felt that the original PlayStation Vita version was a more personal experience, and therefore, better overall. However, it was a commercial failure.

== Gameplay ==
Tearaway Unfolded is an expanded remake of the 2013 PlayStation Vita game Tearaway. Like the original, it is a third-person platform game with a heavy emphasis on environmental interaction, the features of the DualShock 4 controller, and quirky creativity. The player navigates the protagonist though environments made almost entirely out of paper, and may complete side-objectives which involve helping non-player characters and the creation of items. The protagonist's main movement options are jumping, grabbing, and rolling.

When moving through areas, the player mostly modifies the landscape so that new paths can be opened. For example, in order to reach an isolated area, the player might have to bring down a platform by casting a gust of wind, climb onto the platform, and then return the platform to its original position and jump off. The player is also given tools to help with puzzles. One such tool acts as a reef blower or vacuum cleaner, moving items out of the way or defeating enemies. Some tools or objects must first be created on the controller's touch pad. Here, the player can draw the shape of an object and choose the colours. When finished, the item is then used in the game world wherever it is necessary. One instance of this occurs when the player is asked to create a butterfly design. The butterfly design the player creates can then be seen numerous times throughout each level for the rest of the game.

Although the plot and central characters mostly remain unchanged, many gameplay elements from the original have been tweaked for the DualShock 4 controller. For instance, touch-based elements in the original game have been re-mapped and modified for use on PlayStation 4. The creation aspects, where players used the touchscreen to draw objects that would appear in game, are now used on the DualShock's touchpad. Alternatively, the player may use the PlayStation Camera or the PlayStation App to input their drawings. The latter options can also be used to input a real world texture or colour into the game, a feature previously dedicated to the Vita's rear camera. Along with new creation methods, the touchpad is used for interacting with the world. Certain platforms require the player to grab, hold, or drag them off the environment for use. The player can also use the touchpad to create a blast of wind, which can swipe enemies away and blow down extra platforms for use.

The lightbar on the front of the DualShock controller can be used to help illuminate dark areas in the game world, as well as create additional platforms for traversing areas. The gyroscope of the DualShock 4 allows suspending, tilting, and turning platforms in the game, to make them possible for the messenger to traverse.

Tearaway Unfolded renders in 1080p HD, at 60 frames per second frame rate.

== Plot ==
Similarly to that of the original, the player controls the messenger Iota or Atoi (both play identically, with the only difference being the gender; Iota is male while Atoi is female) who is tasked with delivering a message to a portal that has mysteriously opened in the sky, displaying the player (referred to as "The You" in game). Along with The You, enemies known as Scraps are invading the world via the opening. Throughout the adventure, the messenger will traverse many new and reworked levels to reach the Portal, and save their paper world.

== Development and release ==
Tearaway Unfolded was initially a project that allowed Media Molecule to properly experiment with the DualShock 4 and the PlayStation 4's technology for the first time. The studio began to seriously develop Tearaway Unfolded once they realized that the PlayStation 4's features could create an experience that would serve as an alternate version of Tearaway, rather than just a remake.

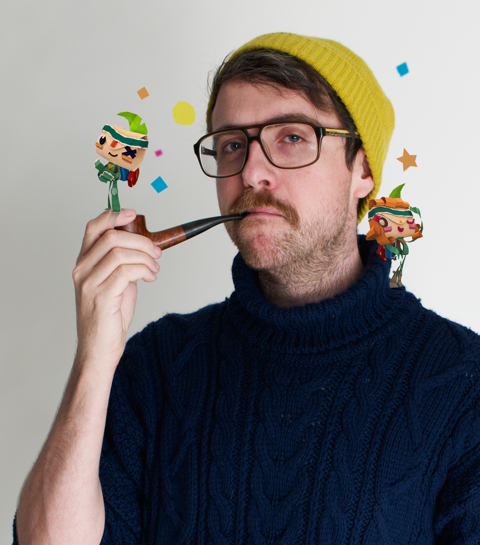
Rex Crowle was the game designer for Unfolded.

The game's designer Rex Crowle stressed that neither version of Tearaway is the definitive version: "I try and think of the two games as two separate versions. In one direction it's gone to Vita and that game is all about the features of the handheld. Some players will play it first on [PlayStation 4] and then go to play it on Vita and enjoy it for seeing that alternate version because it does differ so much. I don't think of the [PlayStation 4] as being the definitive version, just another version."

Media Molecule felt that Unfolded could only be possible on PlayStation 4 because the PlayStation 3 and its controller did not have enough features. "There are a lot of things that we could think about and wonder how we could use them creatively", Crowle said. "[We tried to] give the controller a character, so you feel like a little bit of the world is in your hands." The DualShock 4 was emphasized in part because Media Molecule enjoy implementing innovative concepts into their games, but also so that the "personality" of the device could be brought out in ways that could influence games in the future.

Unfolded allowed for Media Molecule to include items that had been scrapped in the original version because of hardware limitations and time constraints. One such item was the paper plane: "[It] was a thing that one of our level designers desperately wanted to get into the Vita version," Crowle said, "but it just didn't work. So it was great to add it back into the Unfolded version."

The game was released worldwide on September 8, 2015. A special Crafted Edition was given as a pre-order reward and in first print copies. This version includes various in-game extras, along with a copy of the game's soundtrack. The game was not released in all territories. For example, the Indian release was cancelled in late August 2015, over concerns of poor sales. Platforming games as a whole have not sold well in the country, leading to the cancellation of the game's release.

== Reception ==
=== Critical response ===
Reception

Aggregate scores
Aggregator	Score
GameRankings	82.22%
Metacritic	81/100

Review scores
Publication	Score
Eurogamer	Recommended
Game Informer	8/10
GameRevolution	4/5
GameSpot	8/10
GamesRadar+	3.5/5
IGN	7.6/10
VideoGamer.com	9/10

Upon release, Tearaway Unfolded was met with a positive critical reception. On the aggregating review websites GameRankings and Metacritic, the game holds scores of 82.22% based on 27 reviews, and an 81/100 from 70 critics respectively.

Daniel Krupa of IGN gave the game a 7.6/10. He praised the use of the new features of the DualShock 4, the updated graphics, new world areas, and stated that the papercraft world still felt like a "magical experience", also adding that no other game used the features of PlayStation 4 better. However, despite applauding the new areas, he felt they didn't structure properly with the overall narrative, hurting the pacing, and also felt the game as a whole didn't live up to the original.

Tom Orry from VideoGamer.com awarded the game a 9/10, saying: "Unfolded ranks as one of the best remasters released, exhibiting a clear sense of love of the property that simply isn't seen when many older games arrive on new systems." Orry mostly praised the game's visuals and game world design, calling it "absolutely gorgeous" and "wonderful", as well as the "smart" changes integrated into the PlayStation 4 version. Orry felt annoyed by some gimmicky features, such as the game's use of the PlayStation camera and app.

Jeff Cork from Game Informer scored the game an 8/10, saying: "Creation and discovery are at Tearaway's foundation, and I was still pleasantly surprised at the steady drip of new abilities, gameplay elements, and other novelties delivered throughout. Not everything lands, but the parts that do are outstanding. One thing did seem to get lost in the move to PS4, though: Tearaway on Vita was an intimate experience. Holding the device close to my face, it felt as though I was privy to a secret directly from Media Molecule. I'm glad to see the adventure on the big screen, but the console experience feels less personal, and the journey loses a little bit in the transition. That said, Tearaway Unfolded is still a great game for families or anyone else who's looking for an uplifting change of pace."

Game Revolution's Jeb Haught gave the game a 4 out of 5, calling it "whimsical" and "nostalgic". Even though they spoke positively of the game, such as complimenting the "lovely" visuals and "excellent" voice acting, Haught felt the game needed a sprint button and more of a challenge. "Tearaway Unfolded improves upon the original by adding innovative controls, a handy companion app, augmented reality features via the PlayStation camera, and a plethora of new content including expended environments with new quests", Haught wrote. "With this much whimsical content, it's going to be hard to tear away from my TV."

GameSpot's Josiah Renaudin gave the game a positive review, with a score of 8/10. He praised the controls, calling them "creative and effective", liked the art style, calling it "stunning", enjoyed the puzzles for providing rewarding gameplay, and said the world was "cute and charming". Renaudin's criticisms were concerning the overall pacing, which he thought hindered the ending, and the fact that the game places a heavy emphasis on the PlayStation camera, thinking that the player would not get the most out of the game if they did not own the accessory.

Giving a review for GamesRadar, Ludwig Kietzmann scored the game a 3.5 out of 5. Kietzmann mostly praised the game's overall premise, tone, setting and personality, more specifically enjoying the world design and music, saying the game's imaginative nature makes it feels like a "wondrous toy box". However, Kietzmann thought the game could have offered more creative tools for the player, called the platforming "so-so", and also disliked the pacing.

Eurogamer's Dan Whitehead wrote: "More than a mere HD remaster, Media Molecule has rebuilt its Vita classic with entirely new gameplay for the PlayStation 4." Whitehead mostly praised the new controls and changes that were made for the PlayStation 4, as well as the "gorgeous" visuals, the game world, which he commended for feeling "organic" and "lush", and the customization for allowing "stylish acts of creativity", even it was sometimes "fiddly". Whitehead had minor criticisms, one of which was that he felt since the player is no longer holding the world in their hands, via the Vita, the player feels less like a god and feels more distant from the game's world.

During the 19th Annual D.I.C.E. Awards, the Academy of Interactive Arts & Sciences nominated Tearaway Unfolded for "Family Game of the Year".

=== Sales ===
Tearaway Unfolded was considered a commercial failure. While sales figures were not released for the North American market, it failed to make any spot on weekly, monthly, or year-end sales charts. In the United Kingdom, the game debuted at #33 on the weekly sales charts, short of expectations. This stat did not include copies purchased via the PlayStation Store, however.

The game fared even worse in Japan. Tearaway Unfolded did not make any of the major sales tracking charts, meaning it failed to crack the top 50 for its launch month. Digital sales were slightly better, with the game taking the final spot on the PlayStation Store's monthly sales charts.

Analysts attribute Tearaway Unfolded's low sales to a weak marketing campaign by Sony, as well as the release of several higher profile games in the same week, including Metal Gear Solid V: The Phantom Pain, Mad Max, Super Mario Maker, and Until Dawn.
