= Paul Thomson (composer) =

- Born: Paul Ross Thomson; 18 February 1972 (age 53); Walsall, Staffordshire, England, UK
- Origin: Cotswolds, U.K.
- Occupation: Composer
- Years active: 1994–present
- Labels: EMI

Paul Ross Thomson (born 18 February 1972 in Walsall, Staffordshire) is an English composer for film, television, and video games and music technologist who lives in the Cotswolds. He won the 2012 Royal Television Society Craft & Design Award for Music Original Title for his theme music for the BBC TV show The Fades.

== Spitfire Audio ==
He founded the British music technology company Spitfire Audio with fellow composer Christian Henson in 2007. The company has collaborated with Hans Zimmer, Olafur Arnalds, Eric Whitacre and BT.

== Television ==
Thomson has written for a variety of films and television shows.

Recent work also includes the multiple award-winning movie Missed Connections, the film adaptation of Half of a Yellow Sun, the BAFTA Best Drama winning and BANFF Best Youth Fiction award-winning The Fades (2011), Discovery: Project Earth (2008) and The Genius of Charles Darwin (2008).

== Games ==
Thomson was a lead composer on LittleBigPlanet 2 created by Media Molecule creating all of the cinematics for the game, and several adaptive music tracks. He also worked with the company on the first game's downloadable content, scoring the Pirates of the Caribbean premium level pack and the "Marvel" premium level pack. He has also worked on LittleBigPlanet Karting, LittleBigPlanet Vita, and most recently, LittleBigPlanet 3.
