= PlayStation Camera =

Motion sensor and camera accessory for the PlayStation 4 and PlayStation 5

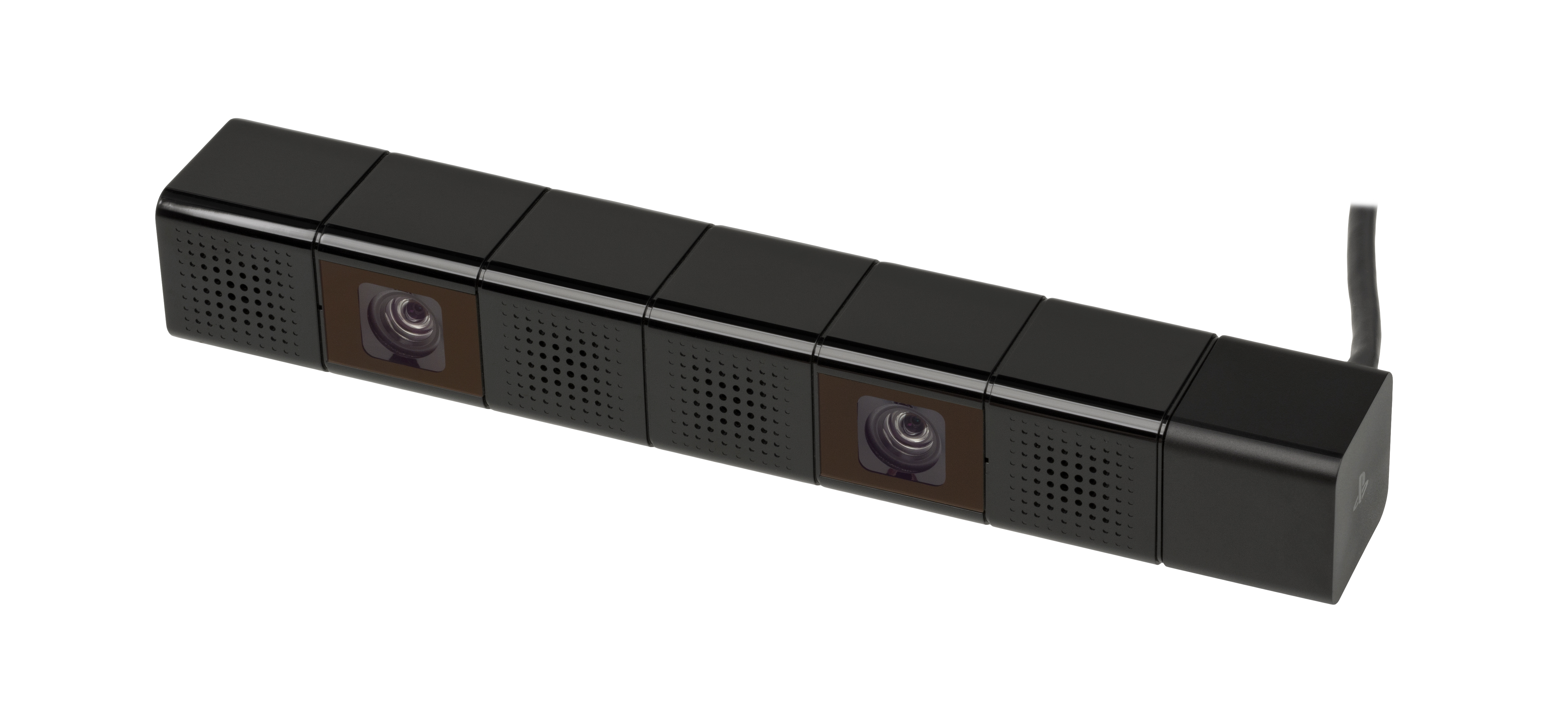
- Developer: Sony Computer Entertainment
- Product family: Sony PlayStation
- Type: Motion sensor; Camera
- Generation: Eighth and ninth
- Released: November 15, 2013
- Camera: 1280×800 pixels @ 60 Hz; 640×400 pixels @ 120 Hz; 320×192 pixels @ 240 Hz
- Connectivity: AUX Port (A proprietary version of the USB 3.0 standard without USB 2.0 compatibility)
- Platform: PlayStation 4; PlayStation 5
- Dimensions: 186 mm × 27 mm × 27 mm (18.6 cm × 2.7 cm × 2.7 cm)
- Predecessor: PlayStation Eye
- Successor: HD Camera
- Related: PlayStation Move; EyeToy; PlayStation VR

The PlayStation Camera is a motion sensor and camera accessory for the PlayStation 4 and PlayStation 5, developed by Sony Computer Entertainment. It is the successor to the PlayStation Eye for the PlayStation 3, which was released in 2007. It is also the motion sensor used to track the PlayStation VR virtual reality headset.

== History ==
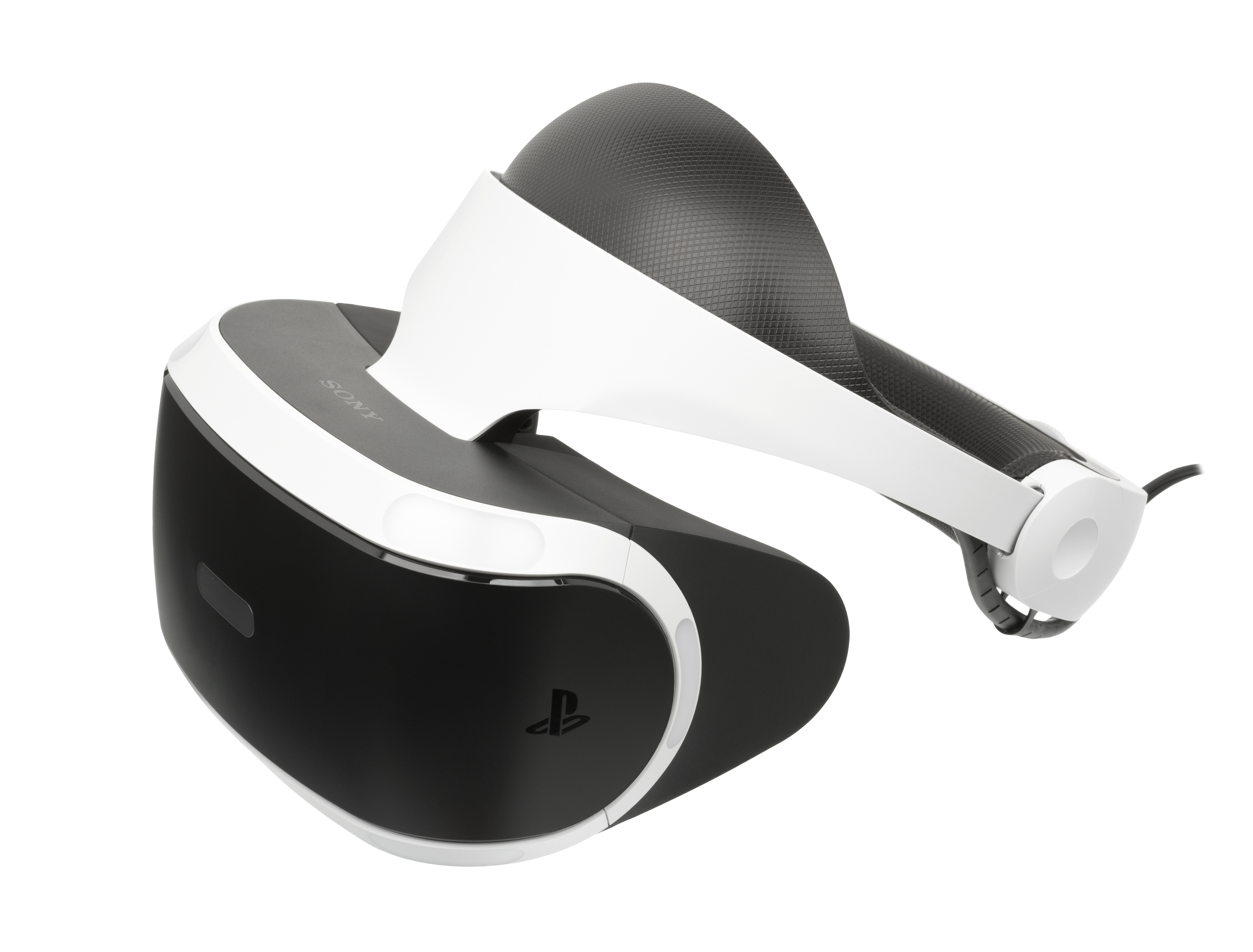
The PlayStation VR headset, which requires the camera

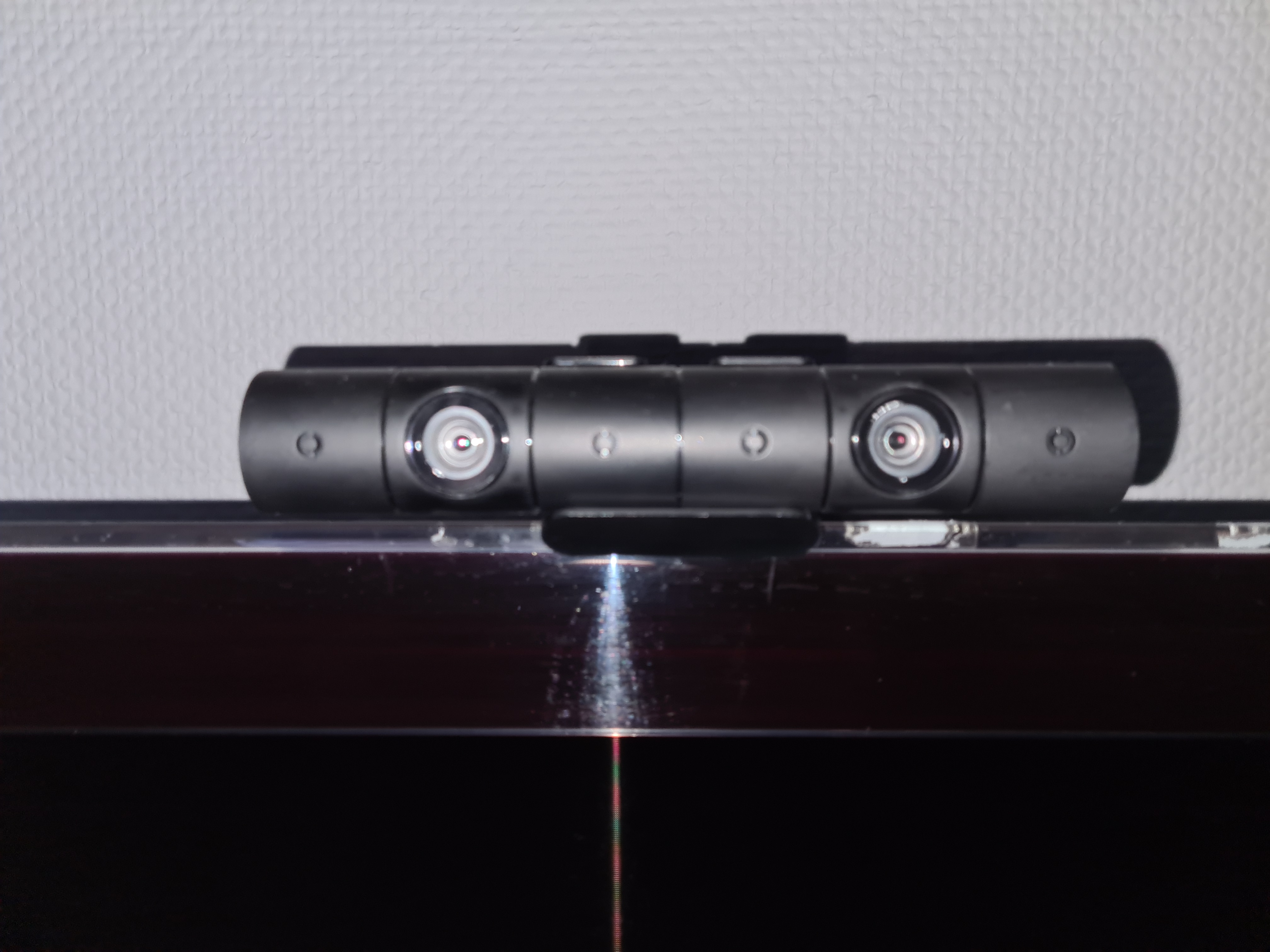
Redesigned version on a TV

On February 21, 2013, a day after the PlayStation 4 was announced, a camera was revealed to be in development for the PlayStation 4, nicknamed the "PlayStation 4 Eye" after its predecessor, the PlayStation Eye. It was also featured in the trailer that teased the PlayStation 4. The PlayStation Camera was released on November 15, 2013, alongside the PlayStation 4.

In March 2014, Sony announced that over 900,000 PlayStation Cameras were sold alongside the PlayStation 4 console, leading to shortages of stock supply. It was estimated that 15% of PlayStation 4 owners also owned a PlayStation Camera.

Alongside the unveiling of the PlayStation 4 Pro and PlayStation 4 Slim on September 7, 2016, a design revision of the PlayStation Camera was unveiled for release on September 15, 2016. The new design has a cylindrical shape instead of the rectangular shape of the original revision, and now features a stand that can be used to adjust the camera's angle, instead of a movable part of the camera itself.

== Hardware ==
PlayStation Camera has two 1280×800 pixel cameras with lenses having an f f/2.0, with a 30 cm focusing distance, and an 85° field of view. With the dual camera setup, the camera can operate at different modes, depending on the target application. The two cameras can be used together for the depth perception of objects in its field of vision, akin to the Xbox's Kinect peripheral. Alternatively, one of the cameras can be used for recording video, and the other for motion tracking.

The camera features a four-channel microphone array, which reduces background noise and may even be used to receive voice commands. It is 186 mm × 27 mm × 27 mm (7.3 in × 1.1 in × 1.1 in) (width × height × depth), with a weight of 183 grams (6.5 oz). It records video in RAW and YUV formats and connects to the console via its specified port.

== Compatible games ==
The following is a list of PlayStation 4 games and software with Camera functionality, some of which were not specifically developed for the PlayStation Camera. All PlayStation VR games require the camera for head tracking as well as the Move controllers, if they are used.

- Alien: Isolation
- Angry Birds Star Wars
- Baila Latino
- Burnout Paradise Remastered
- Commander Cherry's Puzzled Journey
- Dreams
- FIFA 15, 16 and 17
- Just Dance 2014, 2015, 2016, 2017, 2018, 2019, 2020, 2021 and 2022
- LittleBigPlanet 3
- NBA 2K15, 2K16, and 2K17
- Octodad
- Omega Quintet
- Rabbids Invasion: The Interactive TV Show
- Singstar, SingStar Celebration
- SHAREfactory (Software, not game)
- Sportsfriends
- Super Stardust Ultra
- Surgeon Simulator
- Tearaway Unfolded
- The Playroom
- Until Dawn
- War Thunder

The PlayStation 4 system menu supports motion controls and voice commands via the PlayStation Camera (the latter is supported using any microphone).

== PlayStation VR ==
Since the release of PlayStation VR virtual reality headset on October 13, 2016 the PlayStation Camera is used as a major component of the PlayStation VR system. The camera detects LEDs embedded in the headset for the purposes of motion tracking. A USB dongle is required for the camera to be used on the PlayStation 5. This dongle was freely available from Sony directly, provided the user could supply the serial number of their VR breakout box, but as of Nov. 26, 2024 this adapter will no longer be provided by Sony, although third-party options also exist.
