= PlayStation VR =

Virtual reality headset developed by Sony Interactive Entertainment

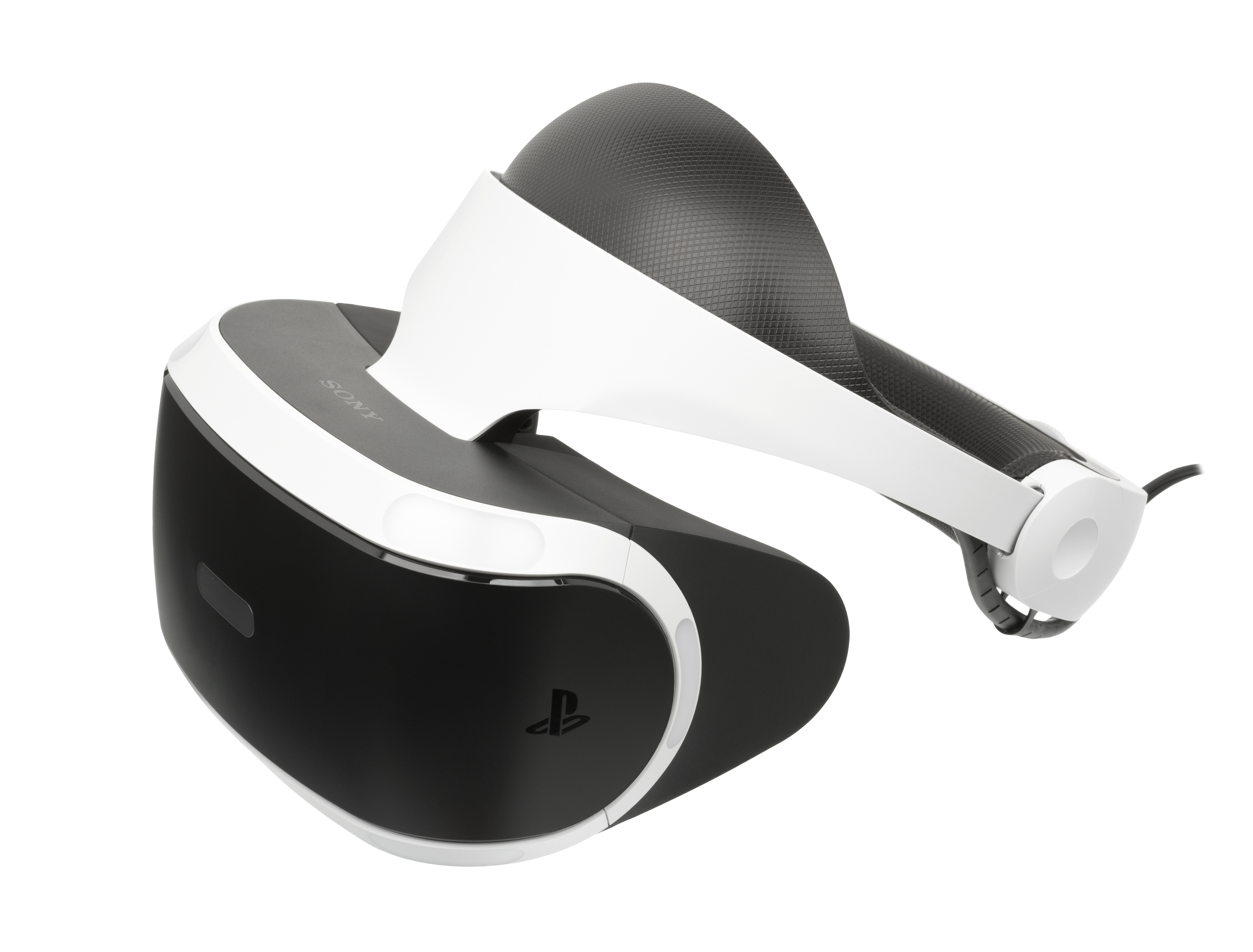
- A first-generation PlayStation VR
- Also known as: PS VR (abbreviation); Project Morpheus (code name)
- Developer: Sony Interactive Entertainment
- Manufacturer: Sony
- Product family: PlayStation
- Type: Virtual reality headset
- Generation: Eighth
- Released: October 13, 2016
- Lifespan: 2016–2024
- Introductory price: $399; €399; ¥44980; £349; A$549; CDN$548; SGD$599; ZAR6499; IDR6.9 million
- Units sold: 5 million (as of December 31, 2019)
- Display: 5.7" OLED, 100° field of view
- Graphics: 1080p RGB (960 × 1080 per eye; 90–120 Hz refresh rate)
- Sound: 3D audio through headphone jack, and available microphone input
- Input: Positional tracking with 9 LEDs via PlayStation Camera
- Controller input: DualShock 4 controller; PlayStation Aim; PlayStation Move
- Camera: PlayStation Camera
- Platform: PlayStation 4; PlayStation 5
- Dimensions: 187×185×277 mm (w × h × l)
- Weight: Approx. 600 grams (1st generation)
- Successor: PlayStation VR2
- Website: Official website

The PlayStation VR (PS VR) is a virtual reality headset developed by Sony Interactive Entertainment and released in October 2016. The headset works with the company's PlayStation 4 video game console and is forward compatible with PlayStation 5. Sony released its successor, PlayStation VR2, in 2023, having sold at least 5 million PlayStation VR units worldwide.

The PlayStation VR has a 5.7 inch OLED panel, with a display resolution of 1080p. The headset also has a processor box which enables the Social Screen video output to the television, as well as process the 3D audio effect, and uses a 3.5mm headphone jack. The headset also has nine positional LEDs on its surface for the PlayStation Camera to track 360 degree head movement.

In certain games and demos for the VR, the player wearing the headset acts separately from other players without the headset. The PlayStation VR system can output a picture to both the PlayStation VR headset and a television simultaneously, with the television either mirroring the picture displayed on the headset, or displaying a separate image for competitive or cooperative gameplay. PlayStation VR works with either the standard DualShock 4 controller, PlayStation Move controllers or the PlayStation VR Aim controller.

== History ==
Sony's interest in head-mounted display technology dates back to the 1990s. Its first commercial unit, the Glasstron, was released in 1997. One application of this technology was in the game MechWarrior 2, which permitted users of the Glasstron or Virtual I/O's iGlasses to adopt a visual perspective from inside the cockpit of the craft, using their own eyes as visual and seeing the battlefield through their craft's own cockpit.

The PlayStation VR was code named Project Morpheus during development. In early 2014, Sony Interactive Entertainment research and development engineer Anton Mikhailov said his team had been working on Project Morpheus for more than three years. According to Mikhailov, the PlayStation 3 Move peripheral, itself revealed in June 2009, was designed with unspecified, future head-mounted technology in mind. "We specced it and built it to be a VR controller, even though VR wasn't a commodity. As engineers, we just said it was the right thing to do. At the time, we didn't have a consumer-grade project that we could work on, but it was definitely designed with that vision in mind." Shuhei Yoshida, the president of Sony's worldwide studios, also said the project started as "grassroots" activity among engineers and programmers, which came into focus in 2010 once the Move controller had been released. Sony also went on record to say it is mandatory for all games to have no less than 60 frames per second at all times.

Project Morpheus was first announced at The 2014 Game Developers Conference. SIE Worldwide Studios president Shuhei Yoshida introduced the device on March 18, 2014, and stated Project Morpheus was "the next innovation from PlayStation that will [shape] the future of games."

On September 15, 2015, it was announced that Project Morpheus would be officially named PlayStation VR. Later in 2015, Sony acquired SoftKinetic, a tech startup whose focus includes visual depth-sensing gesture recognition, for an undisclosed amount.

On October 13, 2016, Sony released the PlayStation VR with the price of $399 in the US, €399 in Europe, £349 in the UK, and ¥44,980 in Japan.

On April 16, 2019, Mark Cerny confirmed that the PlayStation VR would be compatible with the PlayStation 5. This is in addition to new PlayStation VR hardware to be designed for the PlayStation 5 that Sony plans to release after 2021. This was announced as the PlayStation VR2 at the 2022 Consumer Electronics Show.

== Hardware ==
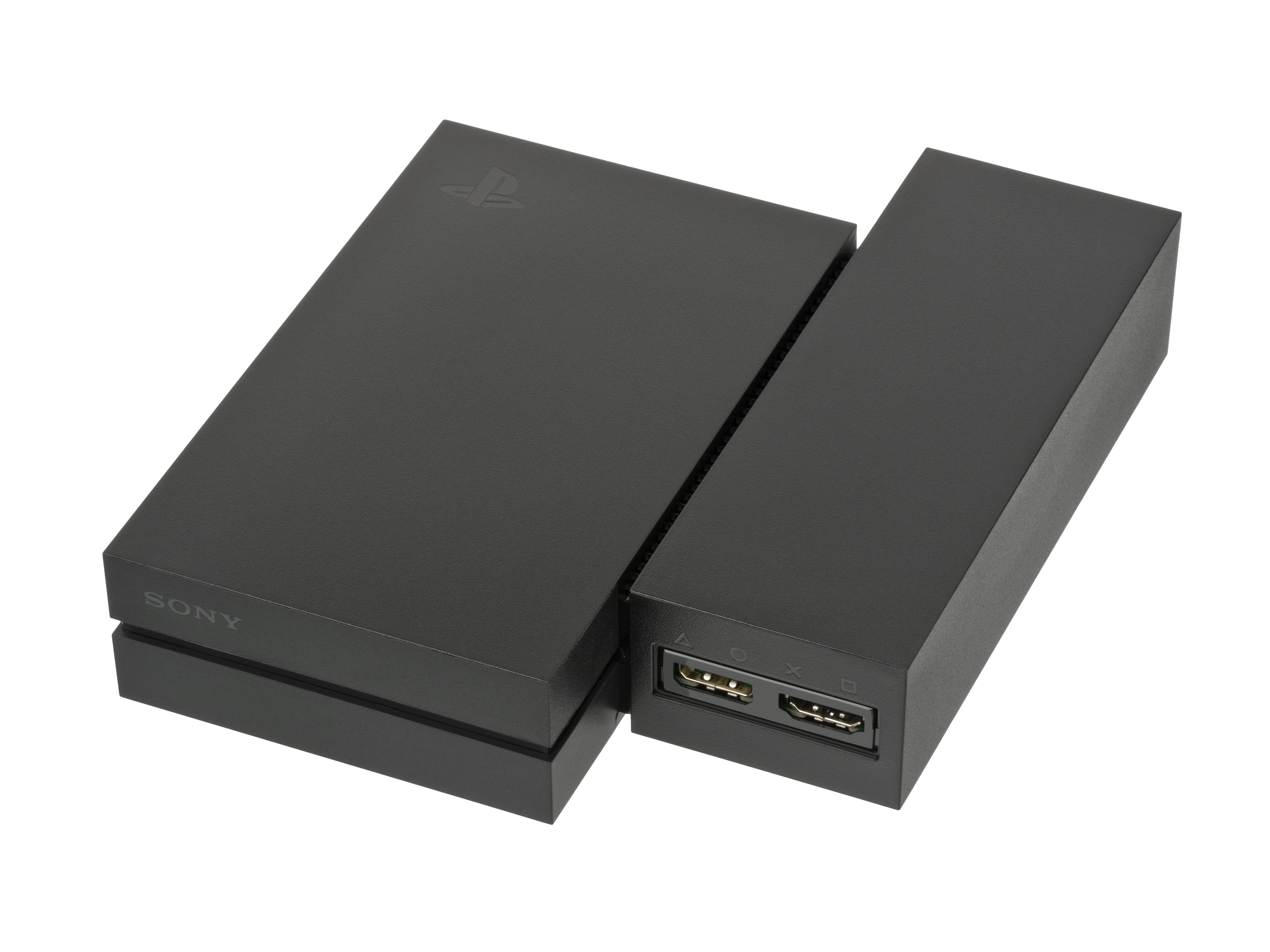
The breakout box (Processor Unit) of the first model headset that sits between the TV, PS4 and PS VR

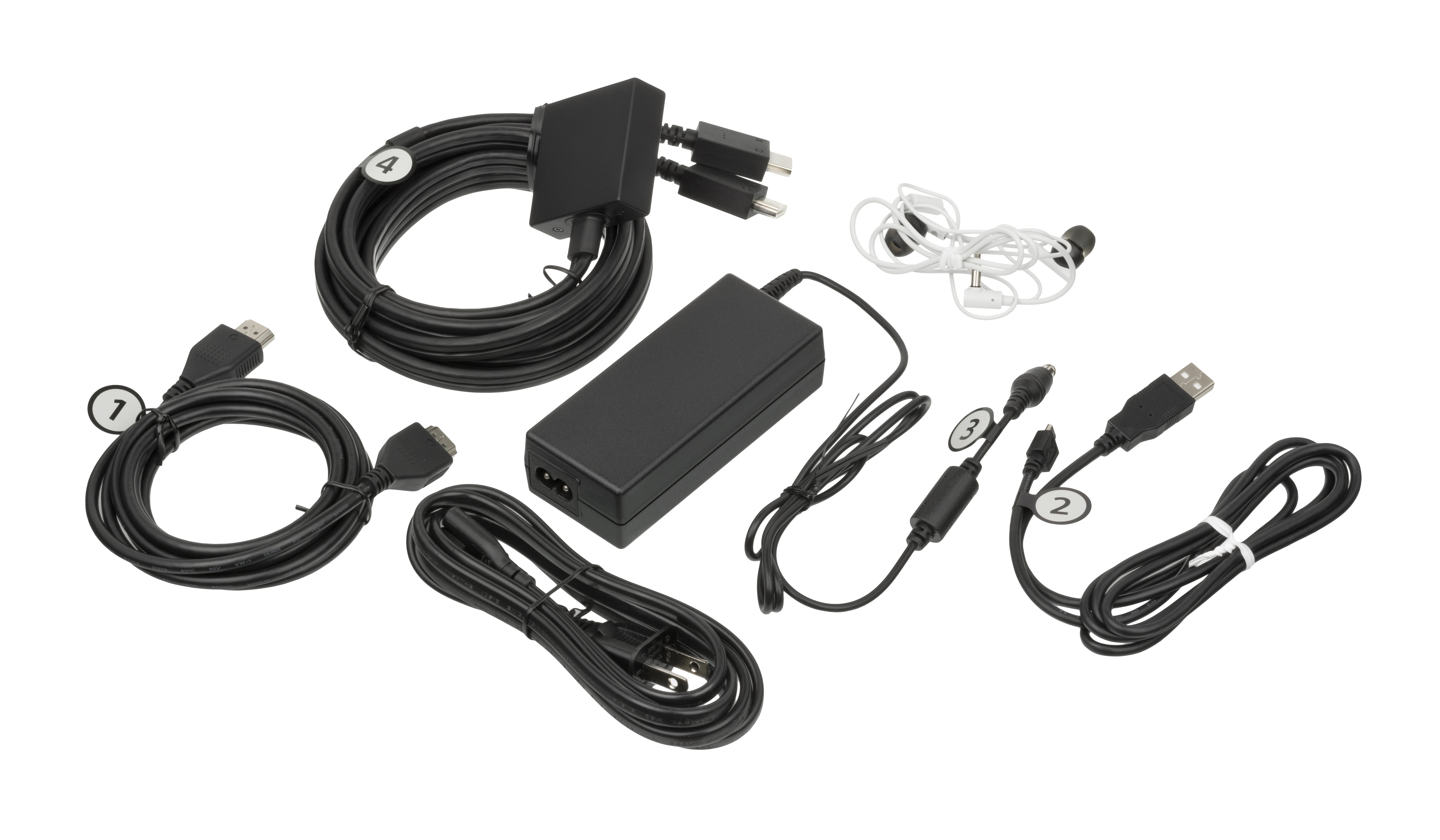
All of the cables required to connect the first model of the PS VR

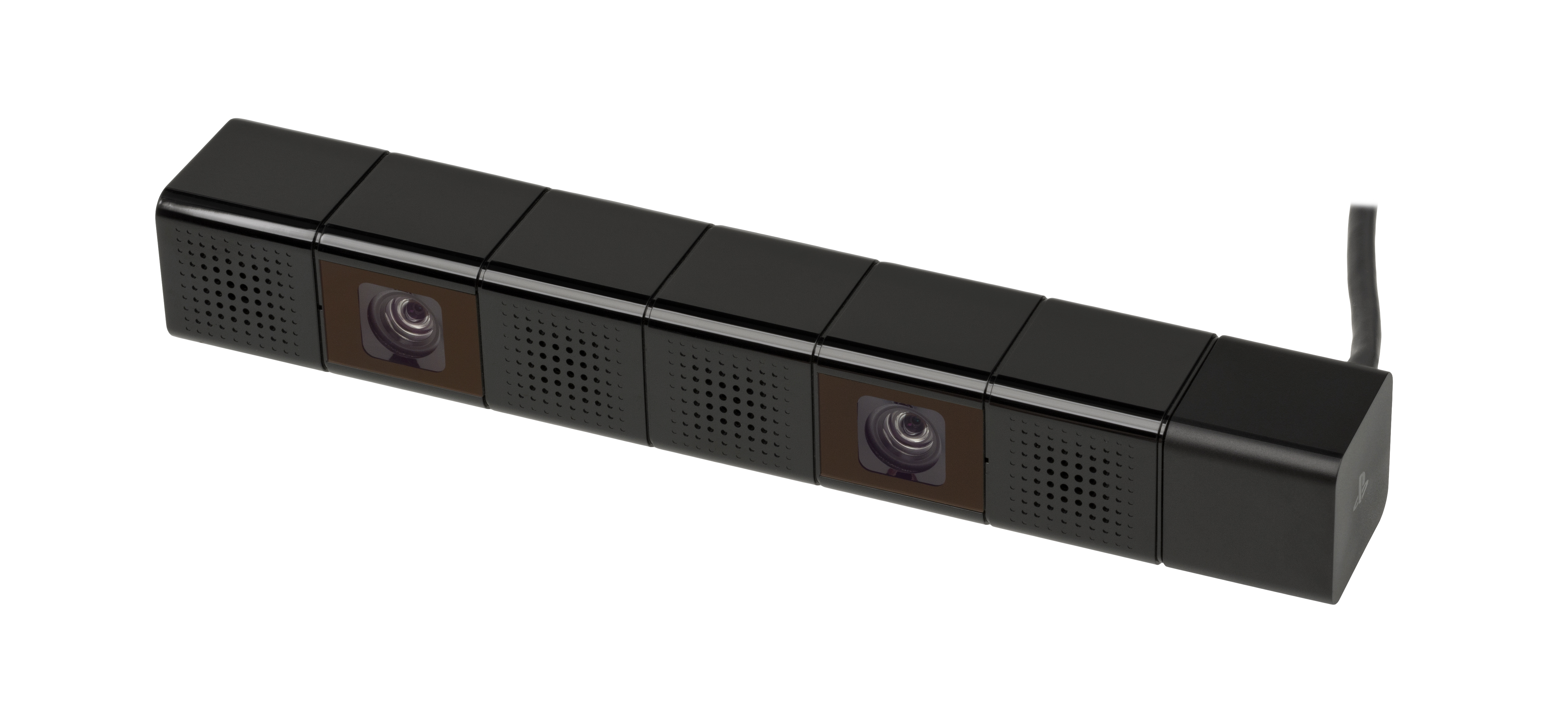
The first version of PlayStation Camera, which is required when using the PS VR

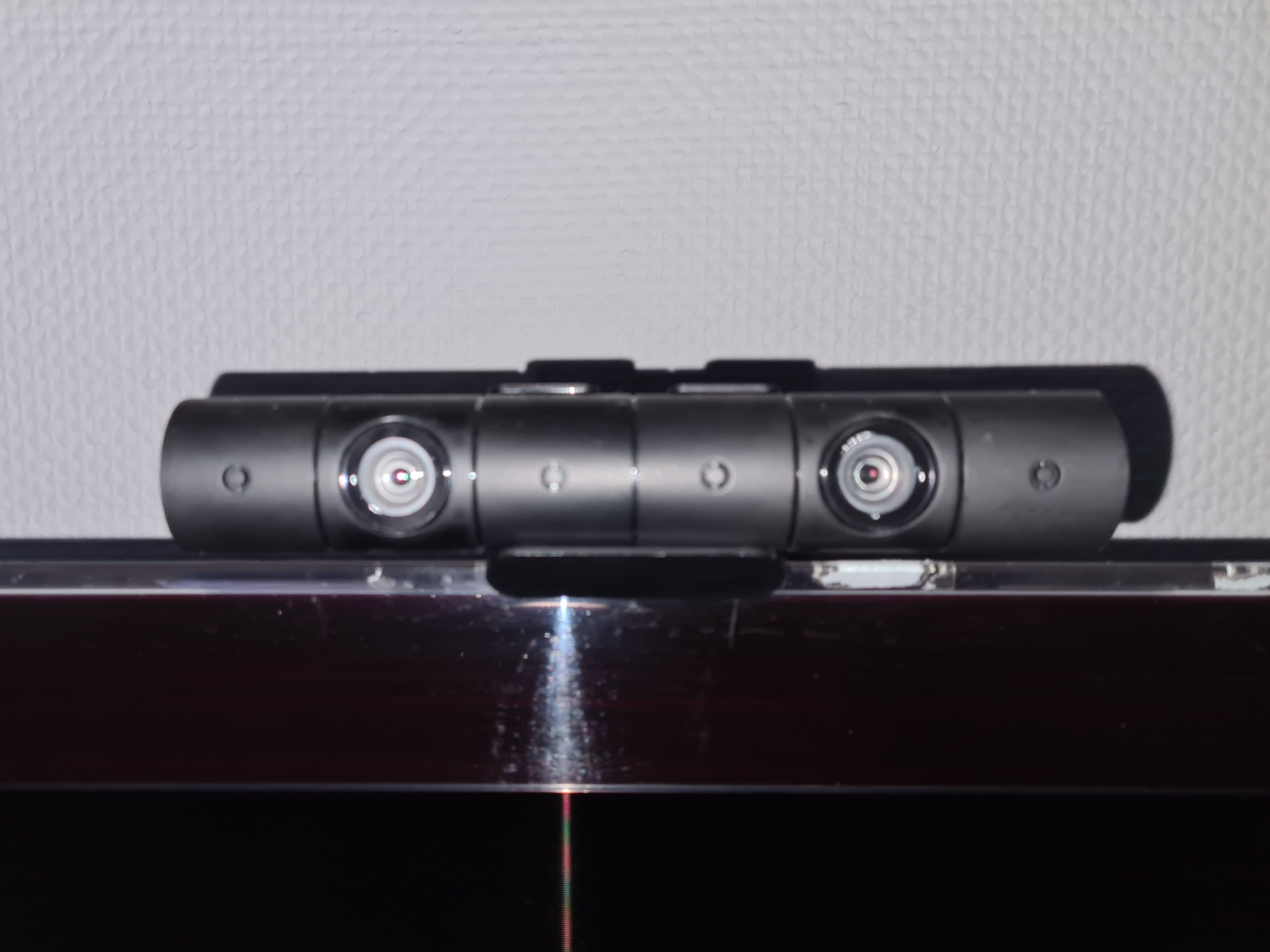
Second version of PlayStation Camera, bundled with the second PS VR revision.

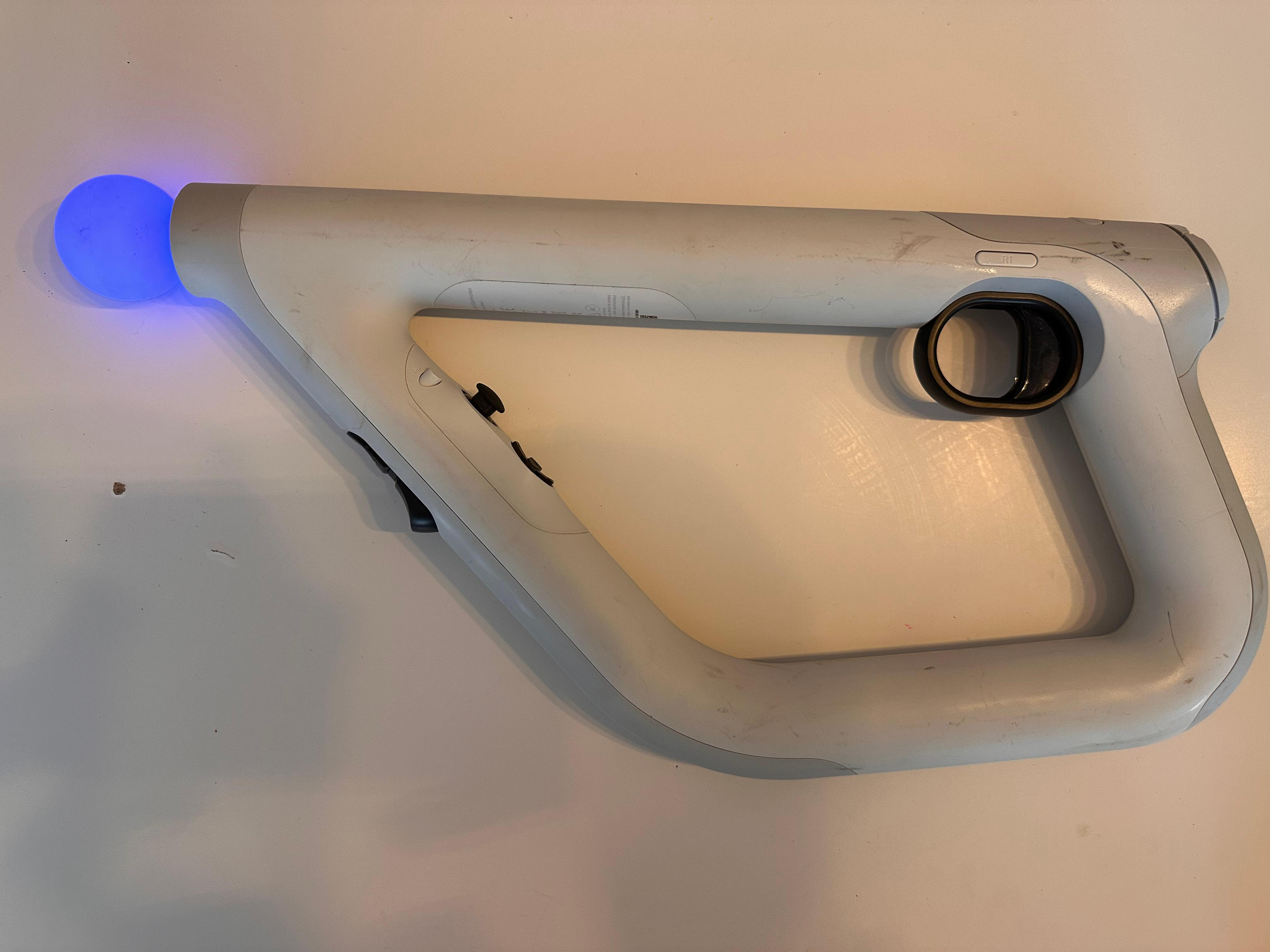
PlayStation VR Aim Controller, sold separately

The prototype revealed at GDC'15 included an OLED 1920 × 1080 pixel display (providing 960 × 1080 pixels resolution per eye) with an RGB subpixel matrix, and is capable of displaying content at 120fps. It features an FOV of 100°, 6DOF head-tracking, stereoscopic 3D, and unwarped output to a TV, either for others to view what the headset wearer sees, or a separate display to compete against the headset user using a standard PS4 controller.

In September 2015, it was revealed the headset would have three rendering modes for developers to choose from: native 90 Hz, native 120 Hz, and a mode where gameplay running at 60 Hz would be displayed at 120 Hz using a motion interpolation technique called asynchronous reprojection. The interpolation would be achieved with little system resources and a small latency of under 18 milliseconds. The technique would also be utilised in the native 120 Hz mode to ensure consistent framerate. According to a Sony representative, the company expects the interpolated 120 Hz mode to be a popular choice for games.

PlayStation VR games can send different perspectives to the headset and television. Shuhei Yoshida, president of SIE Worldwide Studios, explained in regards to a demo by Japan Studio, Monster Escape (in which four players playing off the TV must evade a monster controlled by a player using the headset), that this ability allowed VR to become an asymmetric "social experience", similarly citing the existing game Keep Talking and Nobody Explodes as another example of a VR-compatible game that emphasizes interaction.

The installation requires several cables. The HDMI cable that previously connected the console to the TV goes within the processor unit, which connects to the TV with a second HDMI cable. Then it requires a power cable, and a Micro USB cable to the console. Finally, the connection to the glasses are via a double cable, being one a HDMI cable and the other a proprietary cable. Close to the headset (sitting at chest height when someone is wearing it) is a small box with the power button, microphone, volume controls and headphone jack. Finally, the PlayStation Camera (CUH-ZEY1) connects to the appropriate proprietary port. The first model, model CUH-ZVR1, does not support HDR video pass through.

=== Hardware revision ===
On November 10, 2017, Sony released the CUH-ZVR2 model of the PlayStation VR which included minor changes, like a slimmer, more streamlined connection cable with different connectors from the CUH-ZVR1 model, and integrated stereo headphones. The cable features no buttons, which now sit at the bottom of the headset, while the headphone jack is located behind it. The newer processor unit also supports HDR video pass through. It also comes with a second version of PlayStation Camera (CUH-ZEY2), which has a cylindrical shape. The second revision is not compatible with the first, meaning you can't use a V1 headset with a V2 processor unit, or vice versa.

=== PlayStation VR Aim Controller ===
The Aim Controller is an optional, abstractly-shaped light gun-like peripheral that was bundled with Farpoint and also sold separately for US$59.99. It is also compatible with a limited selection of VR shooter games, and mimics the feel of a gun more closely than a traditional gamepad. It has all the functions of a Dualshock controller, and, unlike the PS3-era Sharp Shooter accessory, does not require a PlayStation Move controller to be slotted in. It was praised by IGN as "a must-have for VR shooter fans on PlayStation".

On the front handle (closer to the user) it features the standard DualShock action buttons, positioned around a clickable analog stick. On the back of the front handle there is a trigger, and on the top of the gun there is a PlayStation button, an extra button and two small R1 buttons, one on either side. The back handle (away from the user) features on the front a directional pad, another clickable analog stick and the share and options buttons, with two extra buttons on the back, L1 and L2. Its model number is CECHYA-ZRA2 and it features a 3V, 800mA battery.

== Games and content ==
In March 2016, Sony said there were 230 developers actively working on content for PlayStation VR, with 50 titles available by the end of the year.

Existing, non-VR games can be played within PlayStation VR via "Cinematic Mode", which renders the content on a simulated projection screen in a 3D space. The mode has three screen size options, ranging up to 226 inches (18.8 ft) in virtual size. PlayStation VR also supports the display of 360-degree photos and video. Other features, such as Share Play and Live from PlayStation, are also compatible within the headset. It can also be used to watch 3D movies on Blu-ray 3D.

=== Use with PlayStation 5 ===
The PlayStation VR is compatible with the PlayStation 5 via backward compatibility using a USB to PlayStation Camera adapter that was shipped for free by Sony to anyone who has previously purchased the PS VR. This option was available until November 26, 2024, and currently the adapter can only be found by third-party vendors. There are currently no PlayStation 5 games announced that support it; if a PS VR supported game also has a PlayStation 5 version available, the PlayStation 4 version has to be installed instead via backward compatibility to be able to play in virtual reality. The PlayStation 5 HD Camera is not compatible with PlayStation VR, thus the PlayStation Camera from PlayStation 4 needs to be used.

Both the regular PlayStation Move Motion Controller and the VR Aim Controller are supported in PlayStation 5. Some games, for instance Astro Bot Rescue Mission, require a DualShock 4 to be used as a controller instead of the PS5 standard DualSense controller, due to the usage of its light bar.

== Marketing ==
"Our biggest challenge will be to get people demoing VR. Because there's no way to sell VR until you've tried it... You can watch over the shoulder, you can read articles, but – and I mean this genuinely – everybody that I know who has tried PlayStation VR has taken off their headset with a smile, and said 'wow'. So you've got to try it. That's the challenge."

— Michael Ephraim, SIE Australia

Prior to release, Sony predicted that interest in the headset would build steadily over time, through word of mouth.

PlayStation VR was first demonstrated on The Tonight Show Starring Jimmy Fallon, and as a playable concept during E3 2014. The device was also featured at Sony's PlayStation Experience Expo in Las Vegas in December 2014. Sony announced new information regarding Project Morpheus at the 2015 Game Developers Conference, in line with the official schedule posted on their website and released updated specifications.

In an interview with Nikkei Japan in March 2016, Sony indicated the possibility of enabling use of the PlayStation VR in connection with a PC. This would allow the device to work with platforms extending further than the PlayStation 4.

== Reception ==
Reviews from most publications were positive; critics praised the PS VR's physical design, ease of use, and availability. Compared to other headsets that require high-end computers, the PlayStation VR only required a PS4. Most criticism was aimed at the system's performance, noting the PS4 offers less compute power than the high-end PCs required to run "PCVR" games, even though it offers "near to PC-quality performance".

=== Sales ===
As of February 19, 2017, PlayStation VR had sold over 915,000 units. Andrew House, the President and Global CEO of Sony Interactive Entertainment (SIE), the company behind the PlayStation VR, stated that the sales of the VR were far beyond expectations. On June 5, 2017, the number of PlayStation VR units sold had passed 1 million. Sony announced that the PlayStation VR had sold over 2 million units and 12.2 million games on December 3, 2017. Sony announced that PlayStation VR had sold-through more than 3 million units and 21.9 million games worldwide as of August 16, 2018, with the PlayStation VR sold-through number increasing to 4.2 million as of March 3, 2019. As of December 31, 2019, PlayStation VR has sold-through 5 million units.

== See also ==
- List of PlayStation VR games
