= 2024 in video games =

The video game industry in 2024 was still in midst of large-scale layoffs since 2022, including large cuts from Microsoft Gaming, Electronic Arts, and Sony Interactive Entertainment. Nearly 15,000 jobs were cut this year.

== Financial performance ==
=== Best-selling premium games by region ===
The following titles were 2024's top ten best-selling premium games by region (excluding microtransactions and free-to-play titles) on PC and console platforms, for Japan, the United States, and Europe.

Rank	Japan	United States	Europe
1	Super Mario Party Jamboree	Call of Duty: Black Ops 6	EA Sports FC 25
2	Dragon Quest III HD-2D Remake	EA Sports College Football 25	Call of Duty: Black Ops 6
3	Mario Kart 8 Deluxe	Helldivers II	EA Sports FC 24
4	Super Mario Bros. Wonder	Dragon Ball: Sparking! Zero	Grand Theft Auto V
5	Momotaro Dentetsu World: Chikyuu wa Kibou de Mawatteru!	NBA 2K25 (Note: Not included digital sales from October to December)	Hogwarts Legacy
6	Animal Crossing: New Horizons	Madden NFL 25	Helldivers II
7	The Legend of Zelda: Echoes of Wisdom	Call of Duty: Modern Warfare III	Red Dead Redemption 2
8	Minecraft Education Edition	EA Sports FC 25	The Crew 2
9	Powerful Pro Baseball 2024-2025	Elden Ring	It Takes Two
10	Final Fantasy VII Rebirth	EA Sports MVP Bundle	Call of Duty: Modern Warfare III

== Top-rated games ==
=== Critically acclaimed titles ===
The following table lists the top-rated games released in 2024 based on Metacritic, which generally considers expansions as separate entities.

2024 releases scoring 90/100 or higher on Metacritic
Title	Developer(s)	Publisher(s)	Release	Platform(s)	Average score
Astro Bot	Team Asobi	Sony Interactive Entertainment	September 6, 2024	PS5	94
Elden Ring Shadow of the Erdtree	FromSoftware	Bandai Namco Entertainment	June 21, 2024	PS4, PS5, WIN, XBO, XSX/S	94
Metaphor: ReFantazio	Studio Zero	Sega, Atlus	October 11, 2024	PS4, PS5, WIN, XSX/S	94
Final Fantasy VII Rebirth	Square Enix		February 29, 2024	PS5	92
Caves of Qud	Freehold Games	Kitfox Games	December 5, 2024	WIN, OSX, LIN	91
Satisfactory	Coffee Stain Studios		September 10, 2024	WIN	91
Slay the Princess — The Pristine Cut	Black Tabby Games	Serenity Forge	October 24, 2024	LIN, OSX, NS, PS4, PS5, WIN, XBO, XSX/S	91
UFO 50	Mossmouth		September 18, 2024	WIN	91
Animal Well	Shared Memory	Bigmode	May 9, 2024	PS5, NS, WIN, XSX/S	90
Balatro	LocalThunk	Playstack	February 20, 2024	DROID, iOS, OSX, NS, PS4, PS5, WIN, XBO, XSX/S	90
Tekken 8	Bandai Namco Studios / Arika	Bandai Namco Entertainment	January 26, 2024	PS5, WIN, XSX/S	90
The Last of Us Part II Remastered	Naughty Dog	Sony Interactive Entertainment	January 19, 2024	PS5	90
Tsukihime: A Piece of Blue Glass Moon	Type-Moon / HuneX	Aniplex	June 27, 2024	PS4, NS	90

=== Major awards ===
Category / Organization		42nd Golden Joystick Awards November 21, 2024	The Game Awards 2024 December 12, 2024	28th Annual D.I.C.E. Awards February 13, 2025		25th Game Developers Choice Awards March 19, 2025		21st British Academy Games Awards April 8, 2025
Game of the Year		Black Myth: Wukong	Astro Bot			Balatro		Astro Bot
Independent / Debut (Note: Some award presentations combine these categories.)	Indie	Another Crab's Treasure, (Note: Self-published Indie); Balatro	Balatro	Balatro				
Independent / Debut	Debut	Another Crab's Treasure, Balatro	Balatro	Balatro				
Mobile		—N/a	Balatro			—N/a		
VR / AR		—N/a	Batman: Arkham Shadow			—N/a		
Artistic Achievement	Animation	Black Myth: Wukong	Metaphor: ReFantazio	Astro Bot		Black Myth: Wukong		Astro Bot
Artistic Achievement	Art Direction	Black Myth: Wukong	Metaphor: ReFantazio	Black Myth: Wukong		Black Myth: Wukong		Neva
Audio	Music	Final Fantasy VII Rebirth		Helldivers 2		Astro Bot		Helldivers 2
Audio	Sound Design	Astro Bot	Senua's Saga: Hellblade II	Helldivers 2		Astro Bot		Astro Bot
Character or Performance	Leading Role	Cody Christian as Cloud Strife; Final Fantasy VII Rebirth	Melina Juergens as Senua; Senua's Saga: Hellblade II	Indiana Jones; Indiana Jones and the Great Circle		—N/a		Alec Newman as Cameron "Caz" McLeary; Still Wakes the Deep
Character or Performance	Supporting Role	Briana White as Aerith Gainsborough; Final Fantasy VII Rebirth	Melina Juergens as Senua; Senua's Saga: Hellblade II	Indiana Jones; Indiana Jones and the Great Circle		—N/a		Karen Dunbar as Finlay; Still Wakes the Deep
Game Direction or Design	Game Design	—N/a	Astro Bot	Astro Bot		Balatro		Astro Bot
Game Direction or Design	Game Direction	—N/a	Astro Bot	Animal Well		Balatro		Astro Bot
Narrative		Final Fantasy VII Rebirth	Metaphor: ReFantazio	Indiana Jones and the Great Circle		Metaphor: ReFantazio		
Technical Achievement		—N/a		Astro Bot				Senua's Saga: Hellblade II
Multiplayer / Online		Helldivers 2				—N/a		Helldivers 2
Action		—N/a	Black Myth: Wukong	Helldivers 2		—N/a		
Adventure		—N/a	Astro Bot	Indiana Jones and the Great Circle		—N/a		
Family		—N/a	Astro Bot			—N/a		Astro Bot
Fighting		—N/a	Tekken 8			—N/a		
Role-Playing		—N/a	Metaphor: ReFantazio			—N/a		
Sports/Racing	Sports	—N/a	EA Sports FC 25	MLB The Show 24		—N/a		
Sports/Racing	Racing	—N/a	EA Sports FC 25	F1 24		—N/a		
Strategy/Simulation		—N/a	Frostpunk 2	Balatro		—N/a		
Social Impact		—N/a	Neva	—N/a		Life Is Strange: Double Exposure		Tales of Kenzera: Zau
Special Award		—N/a	Game Changer	Hall of Fame	Lifetime Achievement	Pioneer Award	Lifetime Achievement	BAFTA Fellowship
Special Award		—N/a	Amir Satvat	Ted Price	Don James	Lucas Pope	Sam Lake	Yoko Shimomura

== Major events ==
Date	Event	Ref.
January 3	Thirteen-year-old Willis Gibson became the first person known to "beat" the NES version of Tetris by reaching its killscreen.	
January 8–11	Unity Technologies announced layoffs affecting 1,800 jobs.	
January 8–11	Twitch announced layoffs affecting 500 jobs.	
January 8–11	Discord announced layoffs affecting 170 jobs.	
January 22	Riot Games laid off about 530 staff.	
January 25	Microsoft Gaming laid off 1,900 staff, and the president of Blizzard Entertainment, Mike Ybarra, left the company.	
January 29	Eidos-Montréal laid off about 100 staff as part of the continuing Embracer Group restructuring.	
February 7	The Walt Disney Company announced a $1.5 billion investment in Epic Games.	
February 13–15	The Academy of Interactive Arts & Sciences hosted the 2024 D.I.C.E. Summit and the 27th Annual D.I.C.E. Awards at the Aria Resort and Casino in Las Vegas, Nevada. Koji Kondo was inducted into the AIAS Hall of Fame.	
February 27	Sony Interactive Entertainment laid off 900 employees across various studios.	
February 28	Electronic Arts laid off 670 staff.	
February 28	Toys for Bob split from Activision and became independent.	
March 8	Sega of America laid off 61 employees across its QA and localization departments.	
March 8	600 Activision QA workers unionized under the Communications Workers of America (CWA), creating the largest video game union in North America.	
March 14	Embracer Group divested Saber Interactive and a portion of its studios to a private firm for $247 million.	
March 18–22	The 2024 Game Developers Conference was held in San Francisco.	
March 28	Relic Entertainment was sold by Sega to an unspecified investor. 240 employees were laid off across multiple Sega Europe studios.	
April 9	Nintendo discontinued the online services for Nintendo 3DS and Wii U software.	
April 16	Take-Two Interactive announced plans to reduce its workforce by 5% by December 2024.	
April 22	Embracer Group announced its intention to transform into three standalone publicly listed entities at Nasdaq Stockholm within the next two years.	
April 23	Atari SA announced that the Infogrames brand would be revived for acquired and archived titles that do not fit within the Atari brand portfolio. The first game released under the brand was Totally Reliable Delivery Service, acquired by Atari SA from the original publisher tinyBuild.	
April 27–29	Evo Japan 2024 was held in Tokyo.	
May 7	Microsoft Gaming closed Arkane Austin and Alpha Dog Games; Roundhouse Studios was merged into Zenimax Online.	
May 23	Atari SA acquired the Intellivision brand and games catalog.	
June 7–10	Summer Game Fest 2024 was held at the YouTube Theater in Inglewood, California.	
June 11	Sumo Group laid off nearly 250 staff.	
June 12	Take-Two Interactive closed its acquisition of Gearbox Entertainment from Embracer Group for $460 million.	
June 14	Microsoft closed Tango Gameworks.	
June 28	Take-Two Interactive closed Intercept Games.	
July 19–21	The 2024 Evolution Championship Series was held in Las Vegas, Nevada.	
July 24	The International Olympic Committee approved the formation of the Olympic Esports Games to launch in 2025 in Saudi Arabia.	
July 24	500 Blizzard Entertainment employees unionized under the Communications Workers of America.	
July 26	SAG-AFTRA voice actors began striking over failure to reach agreements with multiple studios over the use of AI voice acting in video games.	
July 30	The IOC discontinued the Mario & Sonic series after 17 years of partnership with Nintendo and Sega which started in 2007.	
July 31	Bungie laid off 220 staff.	
August 2	GameStop shuttered Game Informer after 33 years.	
August 7	Meta closed Ready at Dawn.	
August 11	Tango Gameworks was revived by Krafton.	
August 21–25	Gamescom 2024 was held in Cologne, Germany.	
August 28	After nearly 20 years of original closure, Argonaut Games was relaunched.	
September 18	Nintendo and The Pokémon Company filed a patent infringement lawsuit against Palworld developer Pocketpair.	
September 26–29	Tokyo Game Show 2024 was held at the Makuhari Messe in Chiba, Japan.	
October 2	The Nintendo Museum opened in Kyoto, Japan.	
October 18	Keywords Studios acquired Certain Affinity.	
October 30	Nintendo Music, a music streaming service featuring Nintendo soundtracks, was released.	
November 6	Take-Two Interactive sold Private Division to an unspecified investor. Roll7 was shut down.	
December 12	The Game Awards 2024 was held at the Peacock Theater in Los Angeles.	
December 19	Sony and Kadokawa Corporation, the parent company of FromSoftware, Spike Chunsoft and Acquire, agreed to form a strategic business alliance, with Sony becoming the largest shareholder in Kadokawa.	

== Notable deaths ==
- January 10 – Jennell Jaquays, 67, tabletop and video game designer, with contributions for Dungeons & Dragons and at id Software.
- February 1 – Carl Weathers, 76, actor, best known for portraying Apollo Creed in the Rocky films and providing voice work in Mercenaries: Playground of Destruction, Mortal Kombat X and The Artful Escape.
- February 5 – Laralyn McWilliams, 58, game designer, lead designer of Full Spectrum Warrior and creative director of Free Realms.
- February 6 – Yoshitaka Murayama, 55, game designer, creator of the Suikoden series.
- February 7 – Mojo Nixon, 66, actor and musician who played Toad in 1993's Super Mario Bros. and appeared in Redneck Rampage.
- March – BrolyLegs, 35, esports player who competed in Street Fighter and Super Smash Bros..
- March 1 – Akira Toriyama, 68, manga creator of Dragon Ball, and character designer for games including the Dragon Quest series, Chrono Trigger and Blue Dragon.
- March 10 – Mutsumi Inomata, 63, illustrator, character designer for the Tales series.
- March 14 - Lee Woo-ri, 24, South Korean actor who voiced Cyno from Genshin Impact and Lord Oyster from Cookie Run: Kingdom.
- March 27 – Joe Lieberman, 82, U.S. senator who led the congressional investigation of violent video games in 1993.
- March 29 – Louis Gossett Jr., 87, stage and screen actor who voiced the Vortigaunts in Half-Life 2.
- May 5 – Bernard Hill, 79, voice actor who voiced Sir Walter Beck in Fable III, and actor best known for portraying King Théoden in The Lord of the Rings sequel film adaptations of The Two Towers and The Return of the King.
- June 27 – Martin Mull, 80, actor who voiced Vlad Plasmius in Nicktoons Unite!.
- July 28 – Erica Ash, 46, actress who voiced Nagi Kirishima in Bloody Roar 4.
- August 10 – Rachael Lillis, 55, actress who voiced Jessie, Misty, and Jigglypuff in Pokémon.
- August 20 – Atsuko Tanaka, 61, actress who voiced Bayonetta in the Bayonetta series and Super Smash Bros. and Lara Croft in Tomb Raider II, Tomb Raider III, and Tomb Raider: The Last Revelation.
- August 30 – Andrew C. Greenberg, 67, co-creator of the Wizardry series.
- September 9 – James Earl Jones, 93, voice actor in Under a Killing Moon, Command & Conquer: Tiberian Sun, and Simba's Mighty Adventure.
- September 29 – Nobuyo Ōyama, 90, actress who voiced the titular character in the Doraemon games and Monokuma in Danganronpa.
- November 6 – Tony Todd, 69, actor who voiced Venom in Marvel's Spider-Man 2 and Locus from Indiana Jones and the Great Circle.
- December 15 – Masayuki Kato, 78, founder of Nihon Falcom.
- December 22 – Gordon Mah Ung, 58, tech and video games journalist for Maximum PC and PC World.
- December 27 – Olivia Hussey, 73, actress from various Star Wars games circa 1998–2011.
- December 28 – Martyn Brown, 57, co-founder of Team17.

== Hardware releases ==
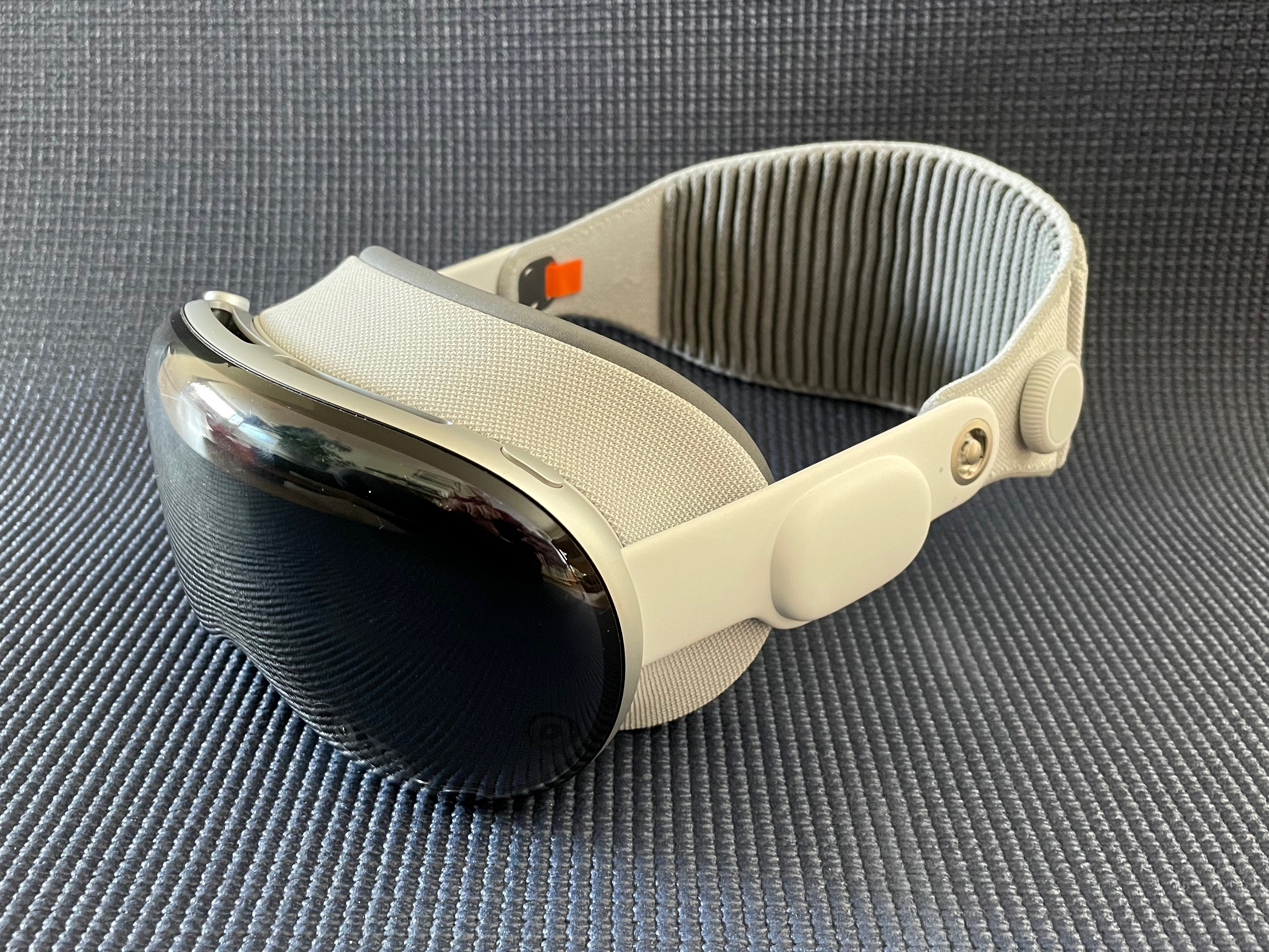
Apple Vision Pro

Date	Console	Manufacturer	Ref.
February 2	Apple Vision Pro	Apple	
March 8	MSI Claw A1M	Micro-Star International	
March 28	Atari 400 Mini	Retro Games Ltd.	
October 15	Meta Quest 3S	Reality Labs	
November 7	PlayStation 5 Pro	Sony	
November 29	Atari 7800+	Atari, Plaion	

== Cancelled games ==
- Blue Protocol, Bandai Namco Entertainment (WIN, PS5, XSX/S)
- Codename Kestrel, Remedy Entertainment (WIN)
- Tom Clancy's The Division Heartland, Ubisoft (WIN, PS4, PS5, XBO, XSX/S)
- Life by You, Paradox Interactive (WIN)
- Paragon: The Overprime, Netmarble (WIN, PS5)
- Project Archipelago, Rebellion Developments (WIN)
- Project T, Behaviour Interactive (WIN)
- Project KV, Dynamis One and Studio Alaya (Note: Cancelled one week after being revealed.)
- Project M and BATTLE CRUSH, NCSoft (WIN, PS5, XSX/S, NS, iOS, DROID)

== Discontinued games ==
- It's Me, Clover Games (iOS, DROID)
- Concord, Firewalk Studios (WIN, PS5)

== Video game-based film and television releases ==
Title	Release / premiere date	Type	Distributor	Franchise	Original game publisher	Ref.
Ark: The Animated Series	March 21, 2024	Animated series	Paramount+	Ark	Studio Wildcard	
Blue Archive the Animation	April 7, 2024	Anime television series	TV Tokyo (Japan)	Blue Archive	Nexon	
Fallout	April 10, 2024	Television series	Amazon Prime Video	Fallout	Bethesda Softworks	
Knuckles	April 26, 2024	Television series	Paramount+	Sonic the Hedgehog	Sega	
Angry Birds Mystery Island	May 21, 2024	Animated series	Amazon Prime Video	Angry Birds	Rovio Entertainment	
Dead Cells: Immortalis	June 19, 2024	Animated series	Animation Digital Network (France)	Dead Cells	Motion Twin	
Sakuna: Of Rice and Ruin	July 6, 2024	Anime television series	TV Tokyo (Japan)	Sakuna	Xseed Games	
Atri: My Dear Moments	July 14, 2024	Anime television series	Tokyo MX (Japan)	Atri	Aniplex	
Borderlands	August 9, 2024	Feature film	Lionsgate Films	Borderlands	2K	
Tomb Raider: The Legend of Lara Croft	October 10, 2024	Animated series	Netflix	Tomb Raider	Eidos Interactive	
Like a Dragon: Yakuza	October 25, 2024	Television series	Amazon Prime Video	Yakuza	Sega	
Secret Level	December 10, 2024	Animated series	Amazon Prime Video	Various		
Sonic the Hedgehog 3	December 20, 2024	Feature film	Paramount Pictures	Sonic the Hedgehog	Sega	

== See also ==
- 2024 in esports
- 2024 in games
