= Solasta: Crown of the Magister =

2021 video game

- Developer: Tactical Adventures
- Publisher: Tactical Adventures
- Engine: Unity
- Platforms: Microsoft Windows; macOS; Xbox One; Xbox Series X/S; PlayStation 5
- Release: Microsoft Windows; May 27, 2021; macOS; November 4, 2021; Xbox One, Series X/S; July 5, 2022; PlayStation 5; March 6, 2024
- Genre: Role-playing
- Modes: Single-player, multiplayer

Solasta: Crown of the Magister is a role-playing video game developed by Tactical Adventures and released in 2021. It is based on the 5th edition Dungeons & Dragons rules, which it uses via the System Reference Document. A sequel, Solasta II, is set to be released as an early access game in 2026 for PC.

== Gameplay ==
Solasta: Crown of the Magister is a tactical role-playing game with turn-based combat. It is set in a fantasy world that was nearly destroyed in an apocalyptic event a thousand years ago. Players create a party of four adventurers to search the ruins of an Elven empire for the jewels needed to empower a powerful artifact. Players can use pre-made characters or make their own. Each character has their own personality and can answer questions by non-player characters or engage in banter with the other party members. Character creation follows the fifth edition Dungeons & Dragons rules and includes five races and seven classes. The plot is generally linear.

Players can create their own adventures using a tool designed to be easy to use. Player-made adventures have a level cap of 16.

== Development ==
Tactical Adventures is an independent studio based in Paris that was founded by Mathieu Girard, formerly of Amplitude Studios. They announced Kickstarter funding for Solasta: Crown of the Magister in September 2019. The game entered early access in October 2020 and was released for Microsoft Windows on May 27, 2021. The macOS version was released on November 4, 2021. The Primal Calling downloadable content released at the same time adds two new playable classes, along with three subclasses for each. Primal Calling also adds one ancestry and a new character background. The game was later ported to consoles on Xbox One and Xbox Series X/S on July 5, 2022. A version for PlayStation 5 was released on March 6, 2024.

On April 14, 2022, Tactical Adventures released the Lost Valley paid DLC, a separate campaign for Solasta. A free update with this release enables multi-player co-op mode and adds a new sub-class to each of the character classes. The Inner Strength DLC, released November 15, 2022, adds three additional classes and the dragonborn ancestry to the game. A free update with this release added 17 new feats and three new backgrounds. The Palace of Ice DLC adds a new, higher-level campaign; new spells; gnomes and tieflings as new playable races; and other changes. A bundle of the base game with all released DLC, called the Lightbringers Edition, was released simultaneously on May 25, 2023.

A new Tactical Adventures subsidiary team, named Talyon, was announced on June 10, 2021. This Lyon, France based studio will develop a tactical RPG based on the same setting as Solasta.

== Reception ==
Reception

Aggregate score
| Aggregator | Score |
|---|---|
| Metacritic | 77/100 |

Review scores
| Publication | Score |
|---|---|
| PC Gamer (US) | 70/100 |
| RPGamer | 3.5/5 |

Solasta: Crown of the Magister received "generally favorable reviews" on Metacritic.

Rick Lane of PC Gamer rated it 70/100. Lane criticized the writing but praised its tactical combat and accessibility to newcomers. Writing for RPGamer, Phillip Willis called it an excellent introduction to both D&D and role-playing games, though he said the story is too cliched. Willis rated it 3.5/5 stars and concluded that it "provides a fun, if somewhat short, ride that most will enjoy". Abraham Kobylanski of RPGFan wrote, "Solasta's combat and systems make for an excellent foundation, but until it gets a compelling story, it will feel a bit empty." Writing for PC Gamer, Jody Macgregor praised the continued evolution of Solasta. After multiple DLC were released, he said it now features a wide variety to choices in character customization, including the option to create oddball parties reminiscent of his own tabletop adventures.

== Sequel ==
A sequel, titled Solasta II, was announced by Tactical Adventures at The Game Awards 2024. It was released as an early access game on March 12, 2026 for PC.
