= The Game Awards 2024 =

Video game awards show

- Date: December 12, 2024
- Venue: Peacock Theater, Los Angeles
- Country: United States
- Hosted by: Geoff Keighley
- Preshow host: Sydnee Goodman

Highlights
- Most awards: Astro Bot (4)
- Most nominations: Astro Bot; Final Fantasy VII Rebirth (7)
- Game of the Year: Astro Bot
- Website: thegameawards.com

Online coverage
- Runtime: 3 hours, 12 minutes
- Viewership: 154 million
- Produced by: Geoff Keighley; Kimmie Kim
- Directed by: Richard Preuss

The Game Awards 2024 was an award show to honor the best video games of 2024. It was the eleventh show hosted by Geoff Keighley, creator and producer of the Game Awards, and held with a live audience at the Peacock Theater in Los Angeles on December 12, 2024, and live streamed across online platforms globally. It featured musical performances from d4vd, Royal & the Serpent, Snoop Dogg, and Twenty One Pilots, and presentations from celebrity guests including Harrison Ford, Hideo Kojima, and Aaron Paul.

Astro Bot and Final Fantasy VII Rebirth led the nominees with seven each, and the former led the show with four wins, including Game of the Year. The inaugural Game Changer award honored Amir Satvat for helping workers in the industry find jobs amid mass layoffs. Several new games were announced, including Elden Ring Nightreign, Intergalactic: The Heretic Prophet, and The Witcher IV. The show was viewed by over 154 million streams, the most in its history to date. (Note: The viewership record was beaten in 2025 with 171 million streams.) Journalists praised the game announcements, developer speeches, and deserving winners, though the eligibility of downloadable content led to mixed responses.

== Background ==
As with previous iterations of the Game Awards, the 2024 show was hosted and produced by Canadian games journalist Geoff Keighley. He returned as an executive producer alongside Kimmie Kim, while Richard Preuss returned as director and LeRoy Bennett as creative director and production designer, and Michael E. Peter joined as co-executive producer. The presentation, celebrating the show's tenth anniversary, took place at the Peacock Theater in Los Angeles on December 12, 2024, and was live streamed across more than 30 online platforms, including Facebook, Instagram, Steam, TikTok, Twitch, Twitter, and YouTube. Alternative live streams offering American Sign Language and audio descriptions were also available on YouTube.

The 2024 stage featured more LED displays than its predecessors, an intentional choice by Bennett to change the show's look each year. Sydnee Goodman returned as host of the 30-minute preshow, titled Opening Act. Public tickets became available for purchase on November 1. Future Class organizer Emily Bouchac indicated that the Future Class initiative—an annual list of 50 individuals from the industry who best represent its future, introduced in 2020—would not induct new members in 2024, instead focusing on valuing existing alumni.

=== Announcements ===
Preceding the Game Awards, several announcements were made during broadcasts by Wholesome Games and the Latin American Games Showcase on December 10, and Day of the Devs and the Women-Led Games Showcase on December 11. Fewer film and television announcements were made during the Game Awards 2024, instead focusing almost primarily on games; a preview for Squid Game's second season was aired, but considered secondary to the promotion of the game Squid Game: Unleashed. Announcements on released and upcoming games were made for:

- Borderlands 4
- Crimson Desert
- Dave the Diver
- Den of Wolves
- Double Dragon Revive
- Dungeon & Fighter: Arad
- Dying Light: The Beast
- Final Fantasy VII Rebirth
- The First Berserker: Khazan
- Game of Thrones: Kingsroad
- Helldivers 2
- Honkai: Star Rail
- Hunt: Showdown
- Infinity Nikki
- Mafia: The Old Country
- Monster Hunter Now
- Palworld
- Slay the Spire 2
- Solo Leveling: Arise
- Squid Game: Unleashed
- Splitgate 2
- Tekken 8
- The Last of Us Part II Remastered
- The Outer Worlds 2
- Zenless Zone Zero

New games announced included:

- Blackfrost: The Long Dark 2
- Catly
- Dispatch
- Elden Ring Nightreign
- Intergalactic: The Heretic Prophet
- Kyora
- Ninja Gaiden: Ragebound
- Untitled Ōkami sequel
- One Move Away
- Onimusha: Way of the Sword
- Project Century
- Project Robot
- Rematch
- Shadow Labyrinth
- Solasta II
- Sonic Racing: CrossWorlds
- Split Fiction
- Stage Fright
- Steel Hunters
- Thick as Thieves
- Turok: Origins
- Untitled Virtua Fighter game
- The Witcher IV

To promote its own game without the budget necessary for the Game Awards, Pengonauts Studio created its own humorous show with Joystick Ventures: the Game Awards for Games Who Can't Afford the Game Awards (TGAGWCAGA). The ceremony on December 13 showcased more than 70 games out of 600 submitted, with specific award names like "Most Likely to Make You Quit Your Job and Become an Artist".

== Winners and nominees ==
Nominees were announced on November 18, 2024. Any game released for public consumption on or before November 22 was eligible for consideration, including downloadable content (DLC), expansions, remakes, remasters, and seasonal content. The nominees were compiled by a jury panel composed of members from over 130 media outlets globally; ballots were due by November 12. Winners were determined between the jury (90 percent) and public voting (10 percent); the latter was held via the official website and on Discord (Note: In China, fan voting was held via platforms such as Bilibili, Douyin, Huya Live, WeChat, Weibo, and Xiaohongshu.) until December 11. The exception was the publicly-voted Players' Voice, for which voting opened on December 2. Specialized juries decided nominees for categories like accessibility, adaptation, and esports. Two awards—Best Esports Coach and Best Esports Event—were discontinued, while an additional honorary award, Game Changer, was introduced. Approximately 112 million public votes were cast overall, a 25% increase from 2023.

As with the preceding year, the Game Awards partnered with map developer Studio 568 and artists Nighttimes and Spiral House to create an in-game hub world in Fortnite, allowing players to vote from November 25 to December 11 for their favorite user-created islands among ten nominees selected by Keighley and his team; the winner was announced during the ceremony. The hub world opened with a photorealistic "MetaHuman" model of Keighley, for which he was scanned in to Unreal Editor for Fortnite at 3Lateral in Manchester. Several critics found the model strange and uncanny. Keighley saw the event as "a prototype" for blending the Game Awards and in-game worlds.

The winners were announced during the awards ceremony on December 12, 2024. Astro Bot became the third game published by Sony Interactive Entertainment to win Game of the Year (after God of War in 2018 and The Last of Us Part II in 2020); its nomination marked Sony's ninth consecutive year in the category and thirteenth nomination overall. It was the second Best Family Game nominee to win the top prize (after It Takes Two in 2021). Balatro was the first solo-developed Game of the Year nominee (and second card game after Hearthstone in 2014), while Black Myth: Wukong was the first Chinese-developed nominee and Elden Ring Shadow of the Erdtree was the first DLC to be nominated.

Final Fantasy VII Rebirth's Best Score and Music win was the second consecutive and third overall for the series (after VII Remake in 2020 and XVI in 2023). Melina Juergens became the first two-time Best Performance winner, having won for the same role in 2017, and Nomada Studio won its second Games for Impact award with Neva (after 2018's Gris). Faker's Best Esports Athlete win was his second consecutive and third overall, and League of Legends's Best Esports Game win was Riot Games's sixth consecutive and the game's fourth overall.

=== Awards ===
Winners are listed first, highlighted in boldface, and indicated with a double dagger (‡).

==== Media ====
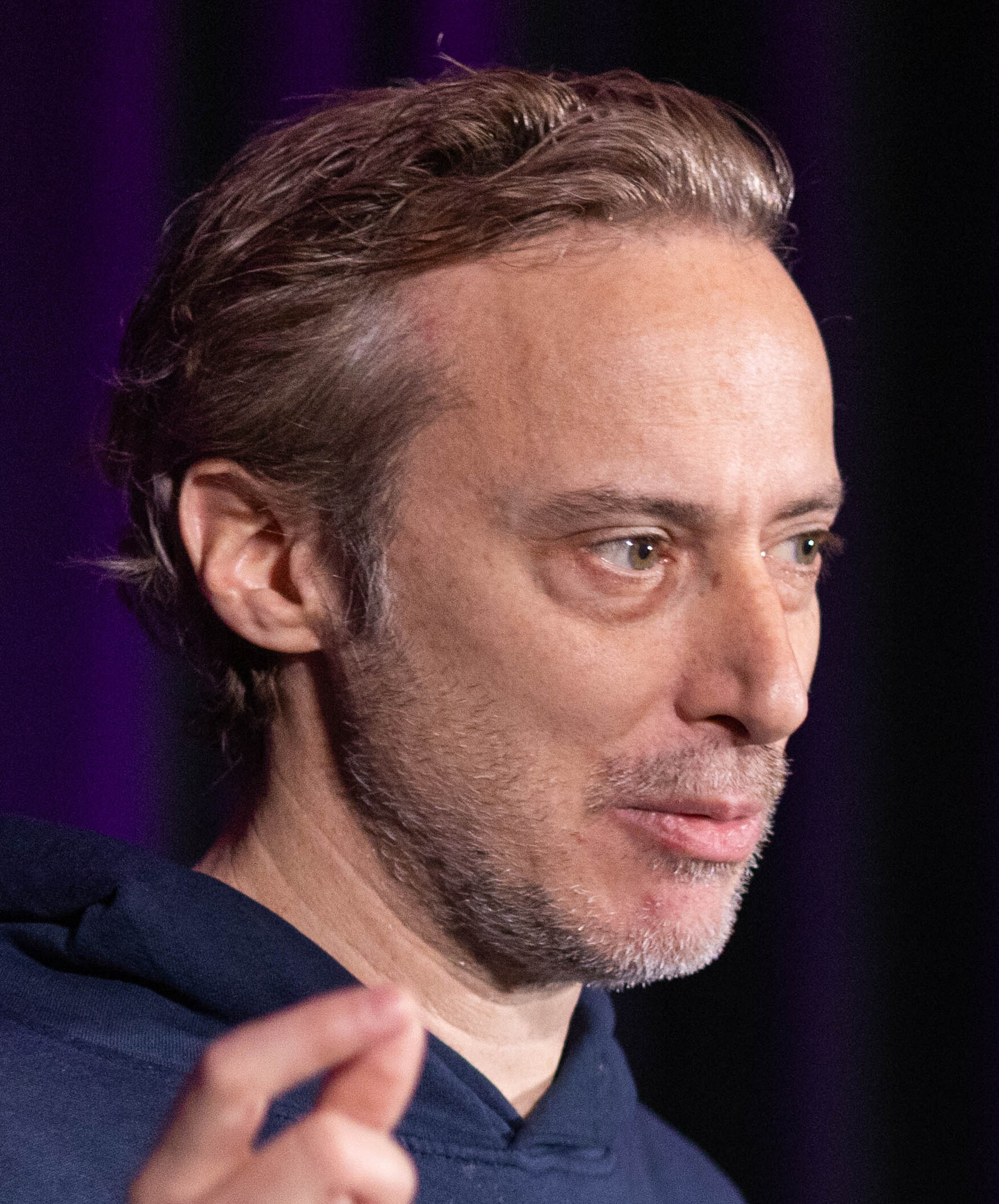
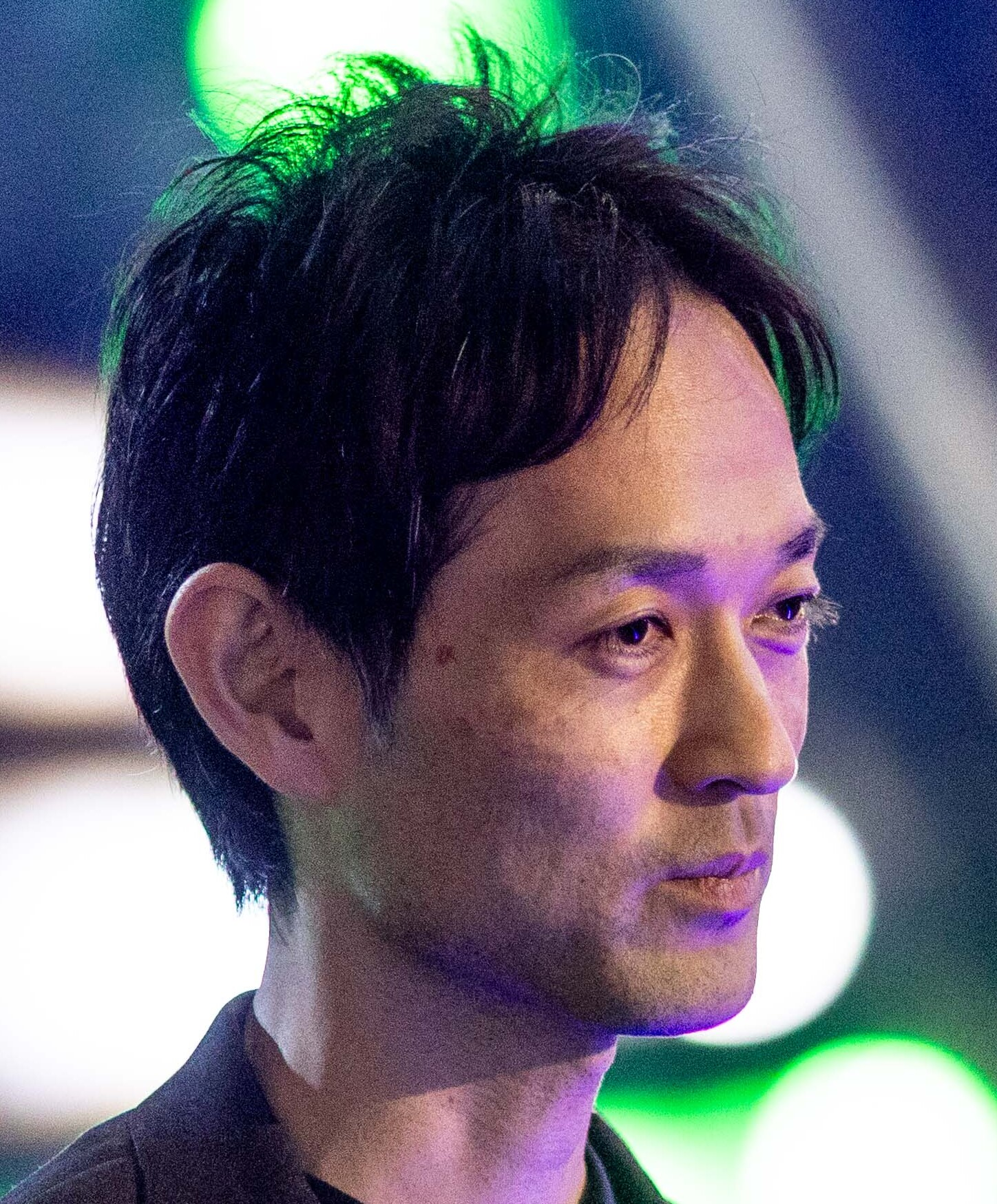
Nicolas Doucet and Masayuki Yamada accepted Game of the Year for Astro Bot. Doucet also accepted Best Game Direction and Best Family Game.

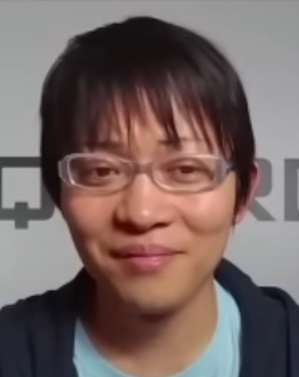
Naoki Hamaguchi accepted Best Score and Music for Final Fantasy VII Rebirth.

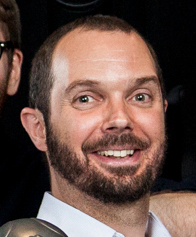
Adrián Cuevas accepted the Games for Impact award for Neva.

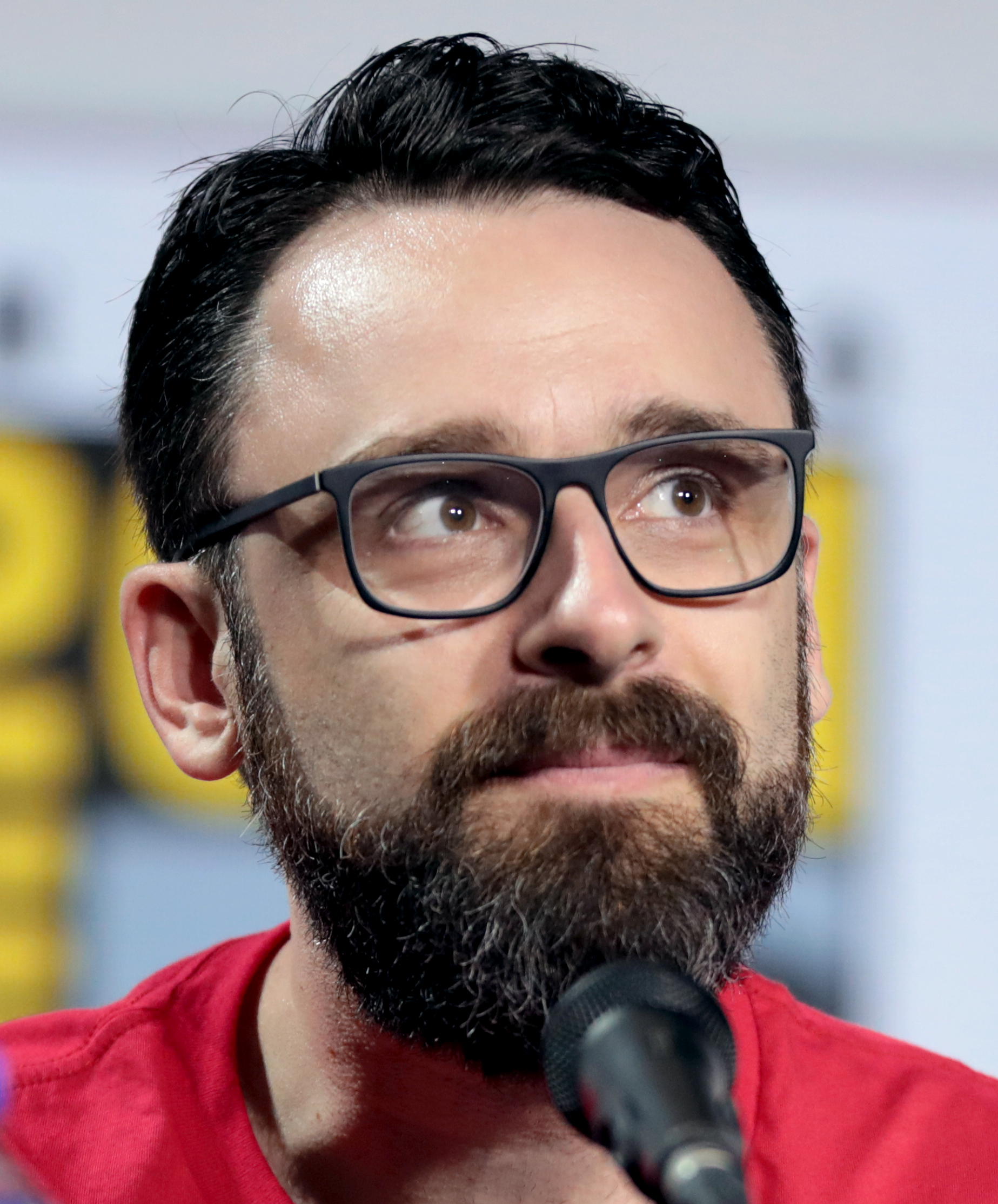
Ryan Payton accepted Best VR / AR Game for Batman: Arkham Shadow with Aaron Whiting.

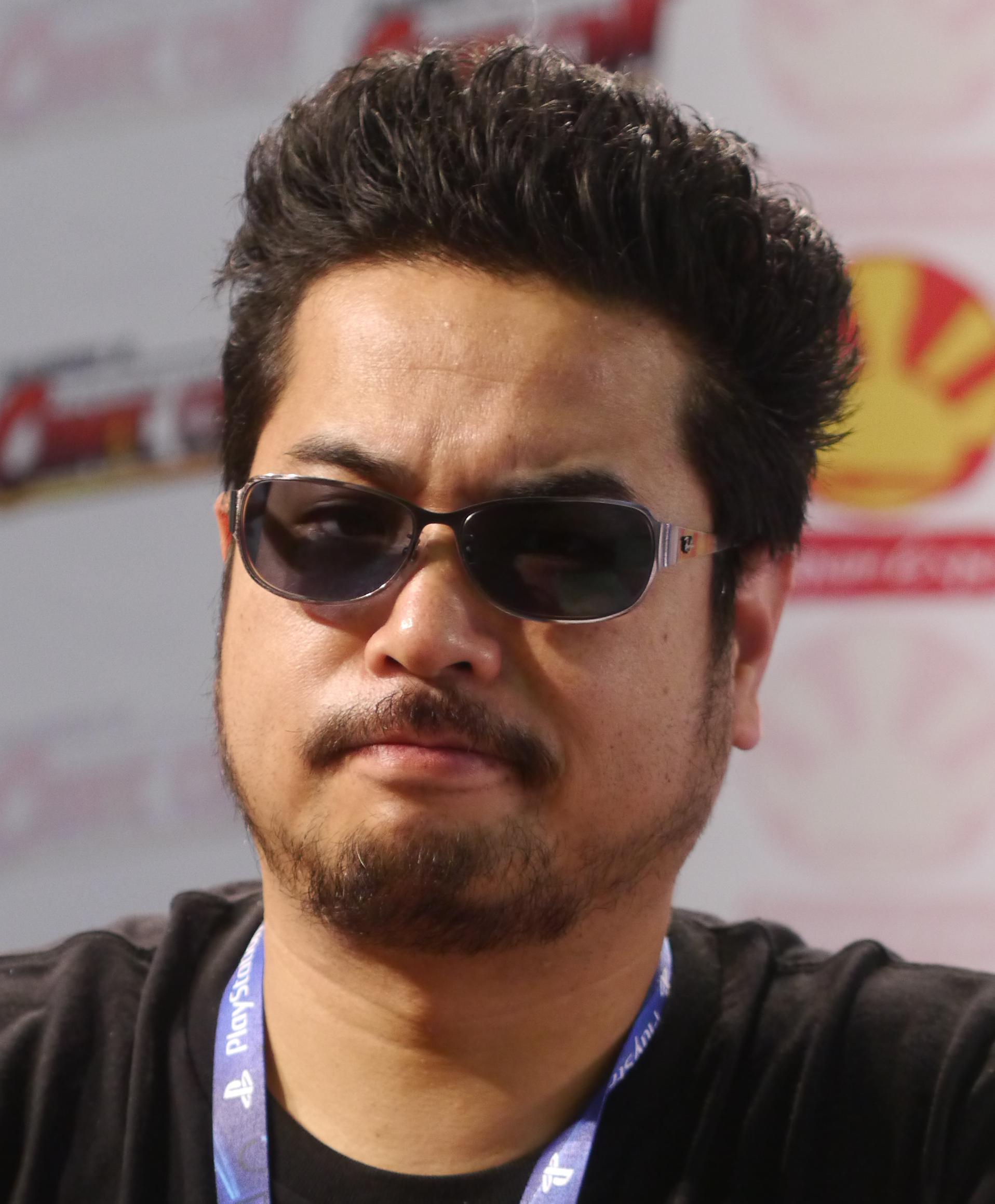
Katsuhiro Harada accepted Best Fighting Game for Tekken 8.

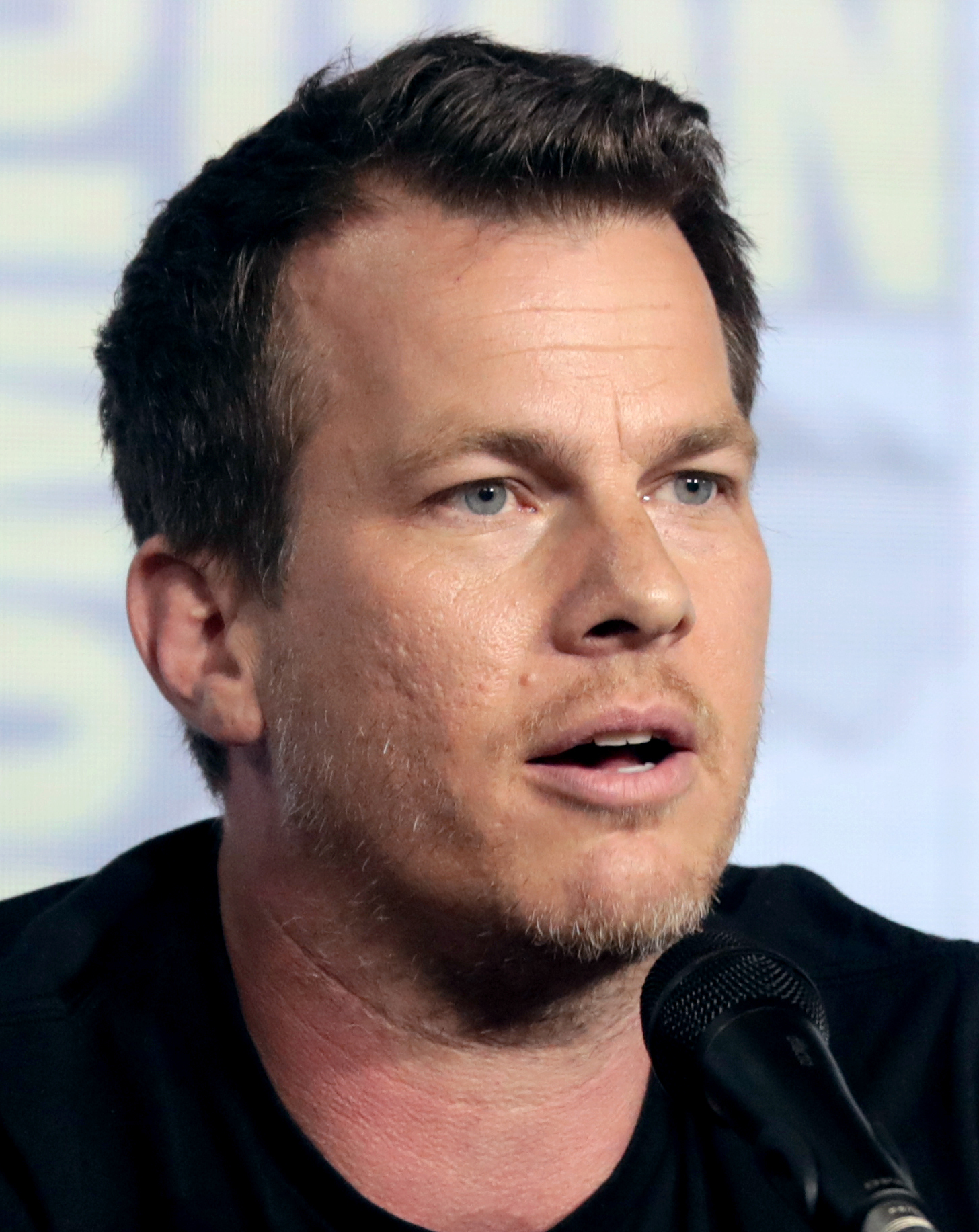
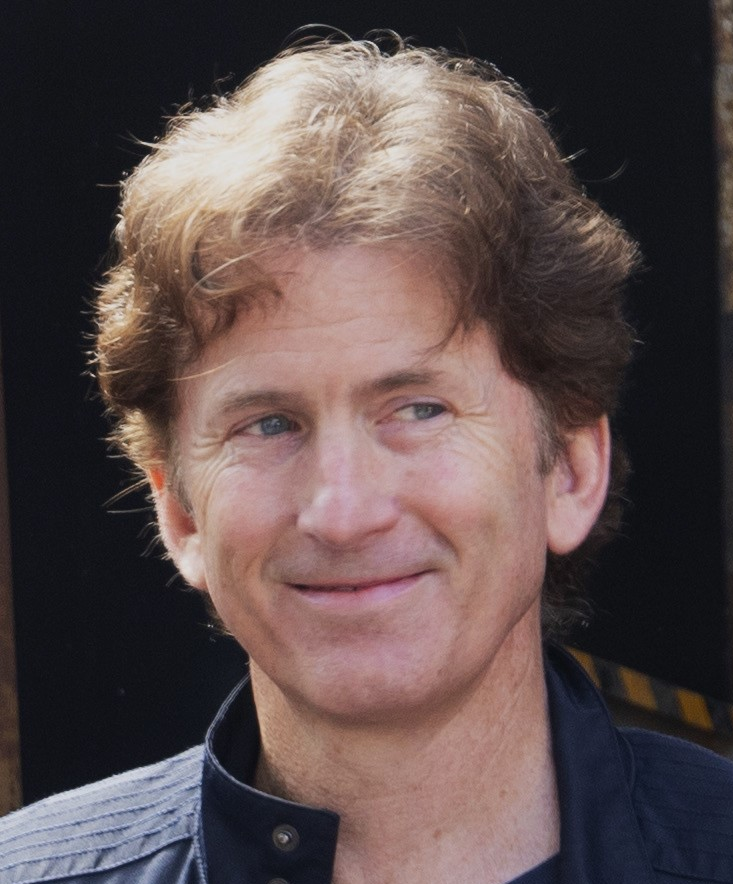
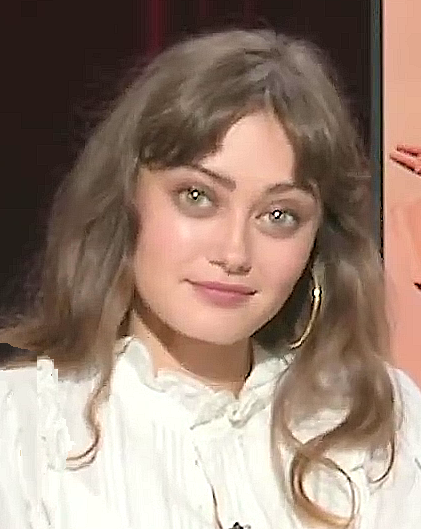
Jonathan Nolan, Todd Howard, and Ella Purnell (top to bottom) accepted Best Adaptation for Fallout.

Game of the Year	Best Game Direction
**Astro Bot – Team Asobi / Sony Interactive Entertainment** ‡; Balatro – LocalThunk / Playstack; Black Myth: Wukong – Game Science; Elden Ring Shadow of the Erdtree – FromSoftware / Bandai Namco Entertainment; Final Fantasy VII Rebirth – Square Enix; Metaphor: ReFantazio – Studio Zero / Sega	**Astro Bot – Team Asobi / Sony Interactive Entertainment** ‡; Balatro – LocalThunk / Playstack; Black Myth: Wukong – Game Science; Elden Ring Shadow of the Erdtree – FromSoftware / Bandai Namco Entertainment; Final Fantasy VII Rebirth – Square Enix; Metaphor: ReFantazio – Studio Zero / Sega
Best Narrative	Best Art Direction
**Metaphor: ReFantazio – Studio Zero / Sega** ‡; Final Fantasy VII Rebirth – Square Enix; Like a Dragon: Infinite Wealth – Ryu Ga Gotoku Studio / Sega; Senua's Saga: Hellblade II – Ninja Theory / Xbox Game Studios; Silent Hill 2 – Bloober Team / Konami	**Metaphor: ReFantazio – Studio Zero / Sega** ‡; Astro Bot – Team Asobi / Sony Interactive Entertainment; Black Myth: Wukong – Game Science; Elden Ring Shadow of the Erdtree – FromSoftware / Bandai Namco Entertainment; Neva – Nomada Studio / Devolver Digital
Best Score and Music	Best Audio Design
**Final Fantasy VII Rebirth – Square Enix** ‡; Astro Bot – Team Asobi / Sony Interactive Entertainment; Metaphor: ReFantazio – Studio Zero / Sega; Silent Hill 2 – Bloober Team / Konami; Stellar Blade – Shift Up / Sony Interactive Entertainment	**Senua's Saga: Hellblade II – Ninja Theory / Xbox Game Studios** ‡; Astro Bot – Team Asobi / Sony Interactive Entertainment; Call of Duty: Black Ops 6 – Treyarch, Raven Software / Activision; Final Fantasy VII Rebirth – Square Enix; Silent Hill 2 – Bloober Team / Konami
Best Performance	Games for Impact
**Melina Juergens as Senua – Senua's Saga: Hellblade II** ‡; Briana White as Aerith Gainsborough – Final Fantasy VII Rebirth; Hannah Telle as Max Caulfield – Life Is Strange: Double Exposure; Humberly González as Kay Vess – Star Wars Outlaws; Luke Roberts as James Sunderland – Silent Hill 2	**Neva – Nomada Studio / Devolver Digital** ‡; Closer the Distance – Osmotic Studios / Skybound Games; Indika – Odd Meter / 11 Bit Studios; Life Is Strange: Double Exposure – Deck Nine / Square Enix; Senua's Saga: Hellblade II – Ninja Theory / Xbox Game Studios; Tales of Kenzera: Zau – Surgent Studios / Electronic Arts
Best Independent Game	Best Debut Indie Game
**Balatro – LocalThunk / Playstack** ‡; Animal Well – Shared Memory / Bigmode; Lorelei and the Laser Eyes – Simogo / Annapurna Interactive; Neva – Nomada Studio / Devolver Digital; UFO 50 – Mossmouth	**Balatro – LocalThunk / Playstack** ‡; Animal Well – Shared Memory / Bigmode; Manor Lords – Slavic Magic / Hooded Horse; Pacific Drive – Ironwood Studios / Kepler Interactive; The Plucky Squire – All Possible Futures / Devolver Digital
Best Ongoing Game	Best Community Support
**Helldivers II – Arrowhead Game Studios / Sony Interactive Entertainment** ‡; Destiny 2: The Final Shape – Bungie; Diablo IV: Vessel of Hatred – Blizzard Entertainment; Final Fantasy XIV: Dawntrail – Square Enix; Fortnite – Epic Games	**Baldur's Gate 3 – Larian Studios** ‡; Final Fantasy XIV: Dawntrail – Square Enix; Fortnite – Epic Games; Helldivers II – Arrowhead Game Studios / Sony Interactive Entertainment; No Man's Sky – Hello Games
Best Mobile Game	Best VR / AR Game
**Balatro – LocalThunk / Playstack** ‡; AFK Journey – Lilith Games / Farlight; Pokémon Trading Card Game Pocket – Creatures Inc., DeNA / The Pokémon Company; Wuthering Waves – Kuro Games; Zenless Zone Zero – miHoYo	**Batman: Arkham Shadow – Camouflaj / Oculus Studios** ‡; Arizona Sunshine Remake – Vertigo Games; Asgard's Wrath 2 – Sanzaru Games / Oculus Studios; Metal: Hellsinger VR – Lab42, The Outsiders / Funcom; Metro Awakening – Vertigo Games / Deep Silver
Best Action Game	Best Action / Adventure Game
**Black Myth: Wukong – Game Science** ‡; Call of Duty: Black Ops 6 – Treyarch, Raven Software / Activision; Helldivers II – Arrowhead Game Studios / Sony Interactive Entertainment; Stellar Blade – Shift Up / Sony Interactive Entertainment; Warhammer 40,000: Space Marine 2 – Saber Interactive / Focus Entertainment	**Astro Bot – Team Asobi / Sony Interactive Entertainment** ‡; The Legend of Zelda: Echoes of Wisdom – Nintendo EPD, Grezzo / Nintendo; Prince of Persia: The Lost Crown – Ubisoft Montpellier / Ubisoft; Silent Hill 2 – Bloober Team / Konami; Star Wars Outlaws – Massive Entertainment / Ubisoft
Best Role Playing Game	Best Fighting Game
**Metaphor: ReFantazio – Studio Zero / Sega** ‡; Dragon's Dogma 2 – Capcom; Elden Ring: Shadow of the Erdtree – FromSoftware / Bandai Namco Entertainment; Final Fantasy VII Rebirth – Square Enix; Like a Dragon: Infinite Wealth – Ryu Ga Gotoku Studio / Sega	**Tekken 8 – Bandai Namco Studios, Arika / Bandai Namco Entertainment** ‡; Dragon Ball: Sparking! Zero – Spike Chunsoft / Bandai Namco Entertainment; Granblue Fantasy Versus: Rising – Arc System Works / Cygames; Marvel vs. Capcom Fighting Collection: Arcade Classics – Capcom; MultiVersus – Player First Games / Warner Bros. Games
Best Family Game	Best Sim / Strategy Game
**Astro Bot – Team Asobi / Sony Interactive Entertainment** ‡; The Legend of Zelda: Echoes of Wisdom – Nintendo EPD, Grezzo / Nintendo; The Plucky Squire – All Possible Futures / Devolver Digital; Princess Peach: Showtime! – Good-Feel / Nintendo; Super Mario Party Jamboree – Nintendo Cube / Nintendo	**Frostpunk 2 – 11 Bit Studios** ‡; Age of Mythology: Retold – World's Edge, Forgotten Empires / Xbox Game Studios; Kunitsu-Gami: Path of the Goddess – Capcom; Manor Lords – Slavic Magic / Hooded Horse; Unicorn Overlord – Vanillaware / Sega
Best Sports / Racing Game	Best Multiplayer Game
**EA Sports FC 25 – EA Vancouver, EA Romania / EA Sports** ‡; F1 24 – Codemasters / EA Sports; NBA 2K25 – Visual Concepts / 2K; TopSpin 2K25 – Hangar 13 / 2K; WWE 2K24 – Visual Concepts / 2K	**Helldivers II – Arrowhead Game Studios / Sony Interactive Entertainment** ‡; Call of Duty: Black Ops 6 – Treyarch, Raven Software / Activision; Super Mario Party Jamboree – Nintendo Cube / Nintendo; Tekken 8 – Bandai Namco Studios, Arika / Bandai Namco Entertainment; Warhammer 40,000: Space Marine 2 – Saber Interactive / Focus Entertainment
Innovation in Accessibility	Best Adaptation (Note: Awarded to media based on video games)
**Prince of Persia: The Lost Crown – Ubisoft Montpellier / Ubisoft** ‡; Call of Duty: Black Ops 6 – Treyarch, Raven Software / Activision; Diablo IV: Vessel of Hatred – Blizzard Entertainment; Dragon Age: The Veilguard – BioWare / Electronic Arts; Star Wars Outlaws – Massive Entertainment / Ubisoft	**Fallout (television series) – Kilter Films, Bethesda Game Studios / Amazon MGM Studios; based on Fallout by Bethesda Softworks** ‡; Arcane (animated series) – Fortiche, Riot Games / Netflix; based on League of Legends by Riot Games; Knuckles (television series) – Sega Sammy Group / Paramount Pictures; based on Sonic the Hedgehog by Sega; Like a Dragon: Yakuza (television series) – Sega / Amazon MGM Studios; based on Like a Dragon by Sega; Tomb Raider: The Legend of Lara Croft (animated series) – Crystal Dynamics, Legendary Television / Netflix; based on Tomb Raider by Crystal Dynamics
Most Anticipated Game	Players' Voice (Note: 100 percent public-voted award with a three-round nomination process that began with 30 games)
**Grand Theft Auto VI – Rockstar Games** ‡; Death Stranding 2: On the Beach – Kojima Productions / Sony Interactive Entertainment; Ghost of Yōtei – Sucker Punch Productions / Sony Interactive Entertainment; Metroid Prime 4: Beyond – Retro Studios / Nintendo; Monster Hunter Wilds – Capcom	**Black Myth: Wukong – Game Science** ‡; Genshin Impact – miHoYo; Elden Ring: Shadow of the Erdtree – FromSoftware / Bandai Namco Entertainment; Wuthering Waves – Kuro Games; Zenless Zone Zero – miHoYo

==== Esports and creators ====
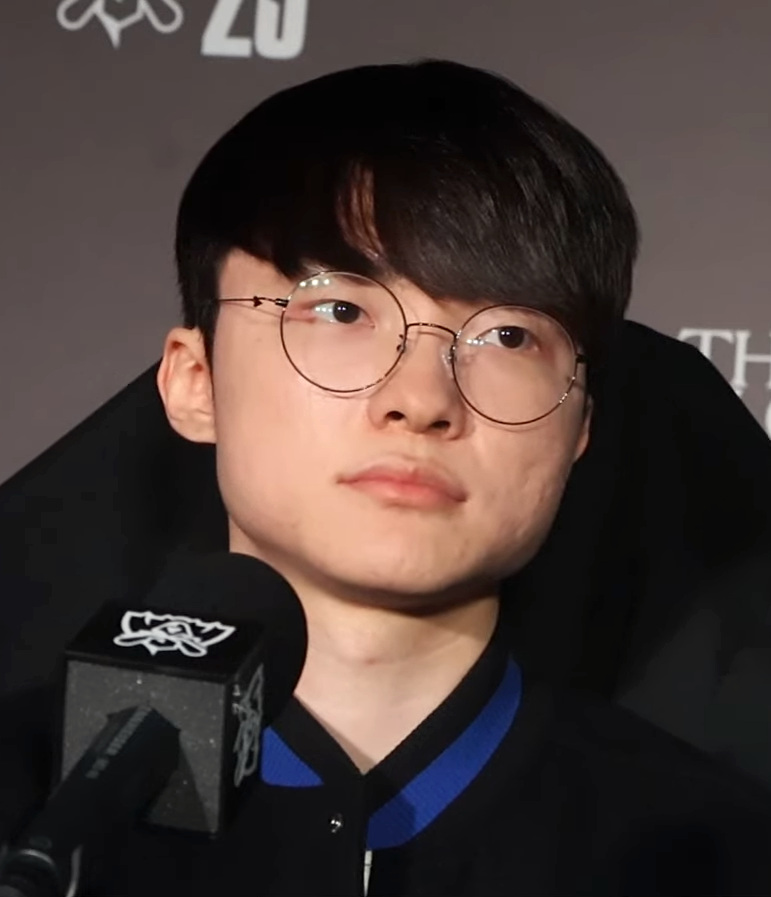
Faker won Best Esports Athlete for the second consecutive year and third time overall.

Best Esports Game (Note: Presented in conjunction with Old Spice)	Best Esports Athlete
**League of Legends – Riot Games** ‡; Counter-Strike 2 – Valve; Dota 2 – Valve; Mobile Legends: Bang Bang – Moonton; Valorant – Riot Games	**Lee "Faker" Sang-hyeok** ‡; Neta "33" Shapira; Aleksi "Aleksib" Virolainen; Jung "Chovy" Ji-hoon; Mathieu "ZywOo" Herbaut; Zheng "ZmjjKK" Yongkang
Best Esports Team	Content Creator of the Year
**T1 (League of Legends)** ‡; Bilibili Gaming (League of Legends); Gen.G (League of Legends); Natus Vincere (Counter-Strike 2); Team Liquid (Dota 2)	**CaseOh** ‡; IlloJuan; Techno Gamerz; Typical Gamer; Usada Pekora

==== Honorary awards ====
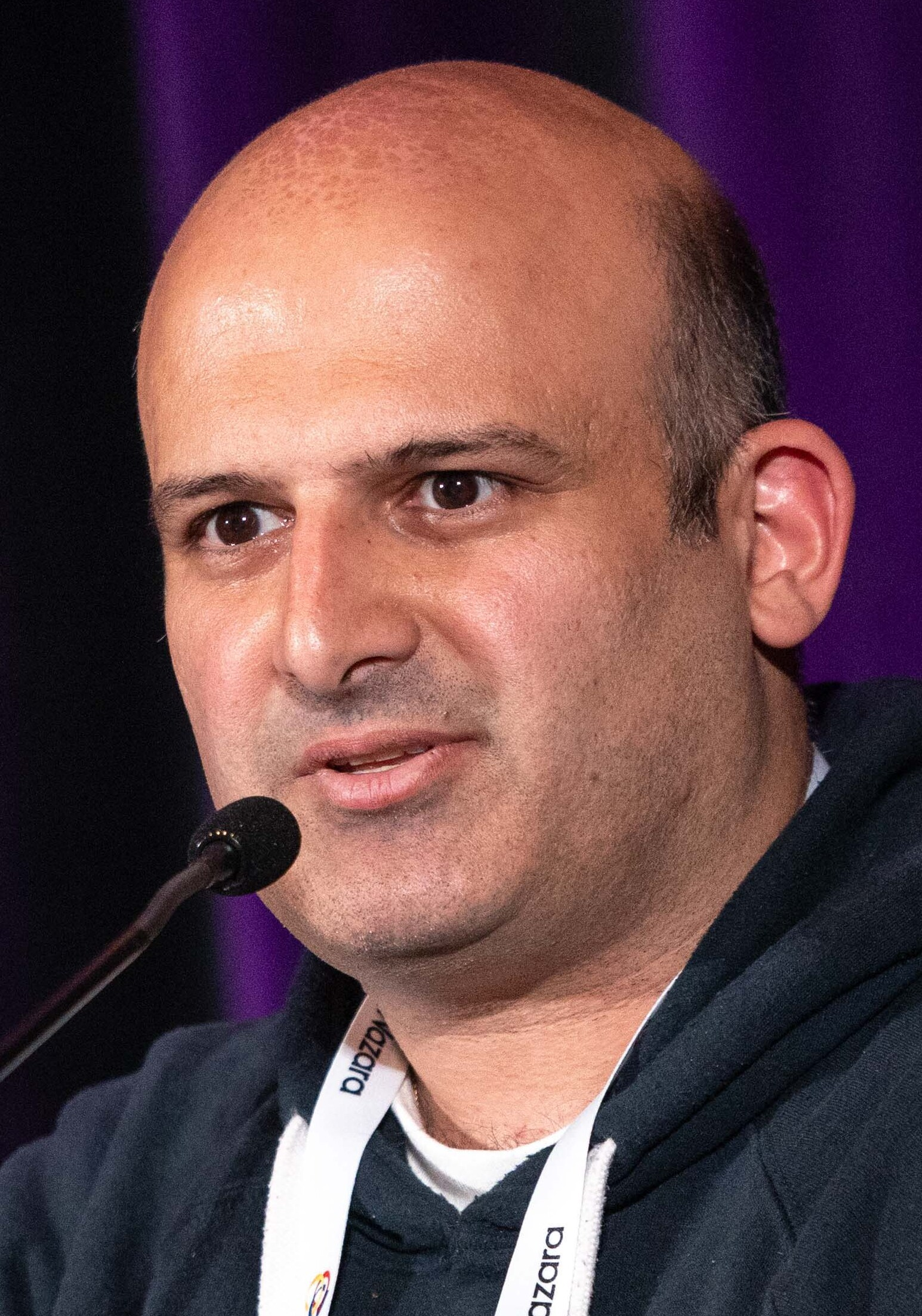
Amir Satvat received the inaugural Game Changer award.

Laura Carter, the founder and chief executive officer of TreesPlease Games, was named a Global Gaming Citizen for her work in climate action; TreesPlease partnered with the Eden Reforestation Projects to plant real trees through the use of its games. Amir Satvat received the inaugural Game Changer award for helping an estimated 3,000 developers find jobs amid mass layoffs.

=== Multiple nominations and awards ===
==== Multiple nominations ====
Astro Bot and Final Fantasy VII Rebirth led the show with seven nominations each, followed by Metaphor: ReFantazio with six. Sony Interactive Entertainment led the publishers with 15 nominations, (Note: Some outlets counted Sony Interactive Entertainment's nominations at 16 as it is the parent company of Destiny 2 publisher Bungie.) followed by Square Enix with 11 (Note: Several outlets counted Square Enix's nominations at 12, based on official material from the Game Awards.) and Sega with 9. (Note: Sega received two additional nominations as co-producer of Knuckles and Like a Dragon: Yakuza for Best Adaptation.) In addition to video game publishers, Amazon MGM Studios and Netflix both received two nominations for their television series in Best Adaptation.

Games that received multiple nominations
Nominations	Game
7	Astro Bot
7	Final Fantasy VII Rebirth
6	Metaphor: ReFantazio
5	Balatro
5	Black Myth: Wukong
5	Elden Ring Shadow of the Erdtree
5	Silent Hill 2
4	Call of Duty: Black Ops 6
4	Helldivers II
4	Senua's Saga: Hellblade II
3	Neva
3	Star Wars Outlaws
2	Animal Well
2	Diablo IV: Vessel of Hatred
2	Final Fantasy XIV: Dawntrail
2	Fortnite
2	The Legend of Zelda: Echoes of Wisdom
2	Life Is Strange: Double Exposure
2	Like a Dragon: Infinite Wealth
2	Manor Lords
2	The Plucky Squire
2	Prince of Persia: The Lost Crown
2	Stellar Blade
2	Super Mario Party Jamboree
2	Tekken 8
2	Warhammer 40,000: Space Marine 2
2	Wuthering Waves
2	Zenless Zone Zero

Nominations by publisher
Nominations	Publisher
15	Sony Interactive Entertainment
11	Square Enix
9	Sega
8	Bandai Namco Entertainment
6	Nintendo
5	Devolver Digital
5	Game Science
5	Konami
5	Playstack
5	Ubisoft
5	Xbox Game Studios (Note: Some outlets counted Xbox Game Studios's nominations at 12 as it is a sister company of Activision, Bethesda Game Studios, and Blizzard Entertainment.)
4	Activision
4	Capcom
4	Electronic Arts
3	2K
3	MiHoYo
2	11 Bit Studios
2	Bigmode
2	Blizzard Entertainment
2	Epic Games
2	Focus Entertainment
2	Hooded Horse
2	Kuro Games
2	Oculus Studios
2	Riot Games (Note: Riot Games received an additional nomination as co-producer of Arcane for Best Adaptation.)
2	Valve

==== Multiple awards ====
Astro Bot led the show with four wins (and its publisher Sony Interactive Entertainment with six), followed by Balatro (Playstack) and Metaphor: ReFantazio (Sega) with three. The 2024 show was Sony's fourth time leading the Game Awards, more than any other publisher to date.

Games that received multiple wins
Awards	Game
4	Astro Bot
3	Balatro
3	Metaphor: ReFantazio
2	Black Myth: Wukong
2	Helldivers II
2	Senua's Saga: Hellblade II

Wins by publisher
Awards	Publisher
6	Sony Interactive Entertainment
3	Playstack
3	Sega
2	Game Science
2	Xbox Game Studios

== Presenters and performers ==
=== Presenters ===
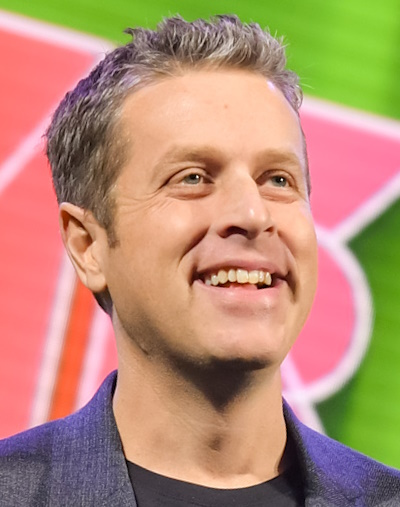
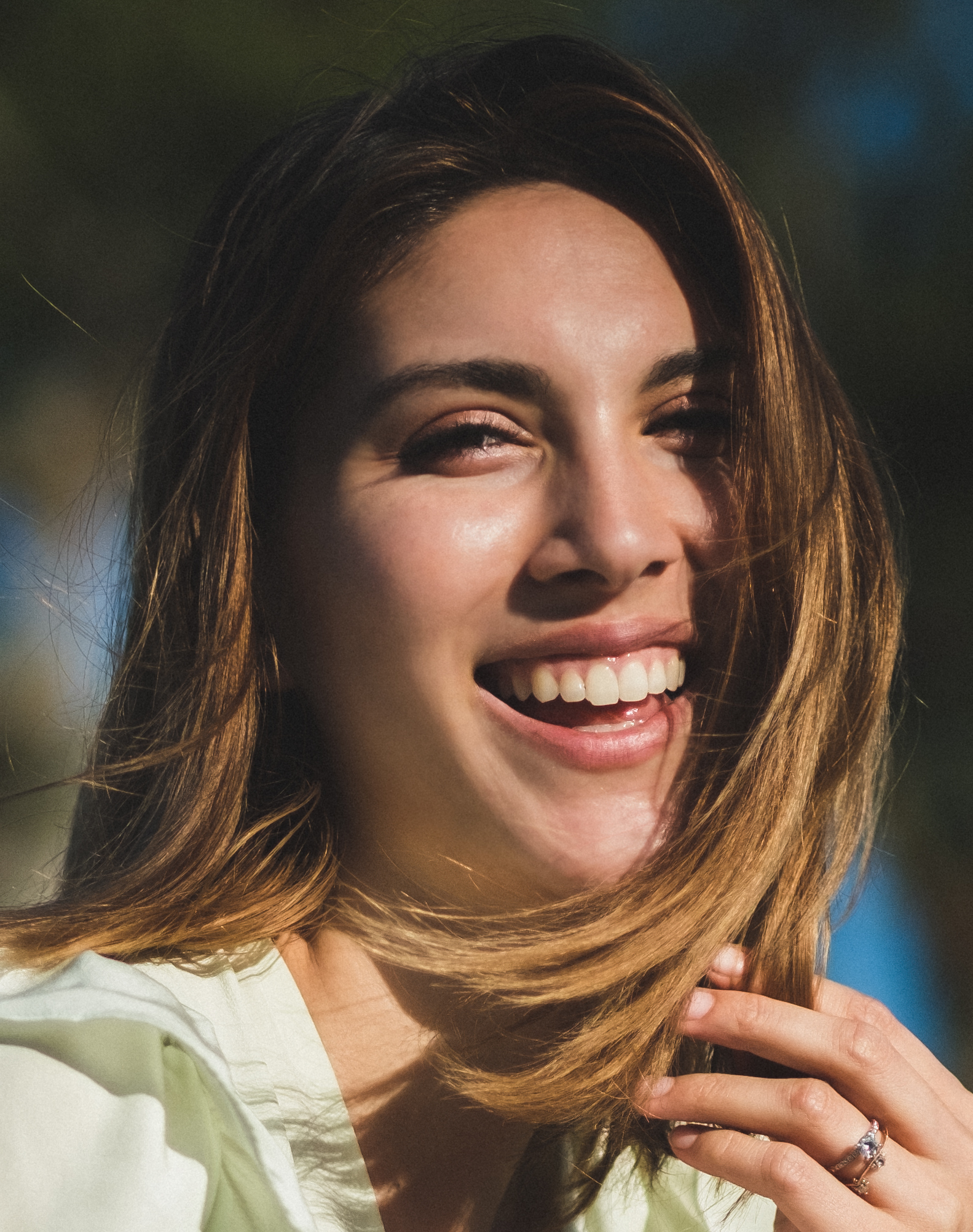
Geoff Keighley (top) hosted the main show while Sydnee Goodman (bottom) hosted the preshow.

The following individuals, listed in order of appearance, presented awards or introduced trailers. All other awards were presented by Keighley or Goodman. Statler and Waldorf also performed comedy skits throughout the show. Keighley and his team monitored the ongoing SAG-AFTRA video game strike when booking celebrity guests and allowed them to choose how they would participate in the show. SAG-AFTRA and the Game Workers of Southern California distributed leaflets outside the Peacock Theatre.

Name	Role
Troy Baker	Presented the award for Best Performance
Harrison Ford	Presented the award for Best Performance
Todd Howard	Presented the award for Best Performance
Abubakar Salim	Presented the award for Best Action Game
Josef Fares	Presented the reveal trailer for Split Fiction
Randy Pitchford	Presented the first look trailer for Borderlands 4
Hideo Kojima	Presented the award for Best Game Direction
Craig Lee Thomas	Presented the reveal trailer for Helldivers 2: Omens of Tyranny
Rebecca Ford	Presented the final trailer for Warframe: 1999
Celia Schilling	Presented the award for Best Debut Indie Game
Sean Velasco	Presented the award for Best Debut Indie Game
Cordell Broadus	Presented the award for Best Ongoing Game
Snoop Dogg	Presented the award for Best Ongoing Game
Isabela Merced	Presented the award for Best Adaptation
Shannon Woodward	Presented the award for Best Adaptation
Khalid	Presented the award for Best Score and Music
Laura Bailey	Presented the reveal trailer for Dispatch
Aaron Paul	Presented the reveal trailer for Dispatch
Sam Lake	Presented the award for Best Narrative
Swen Vincke	Presented the award for Game of the Year

=== Performers ===
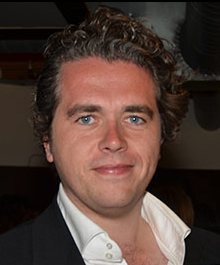
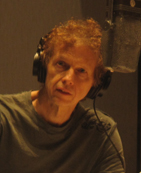
Lorne Balfe (left) conducted the orchestra, with a segment arranged by David Campbell (right).
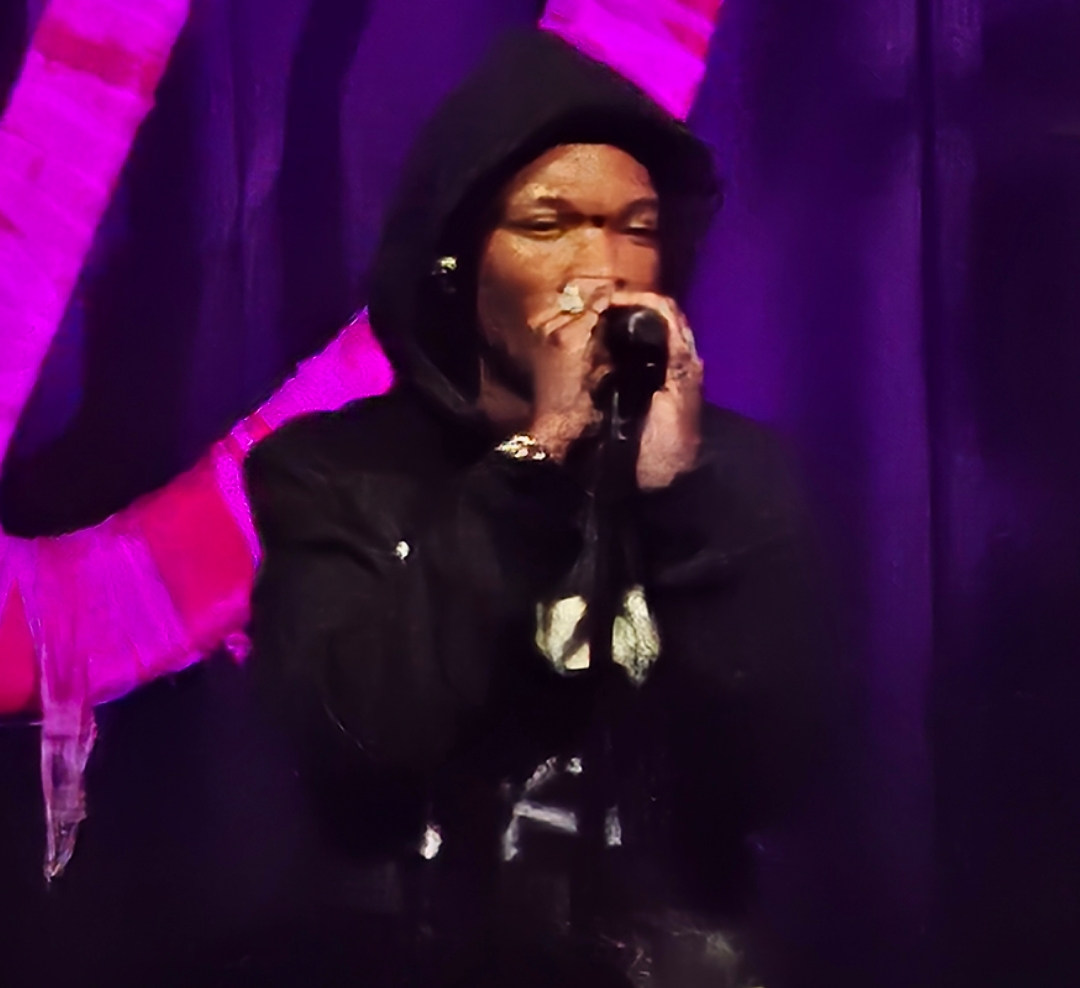
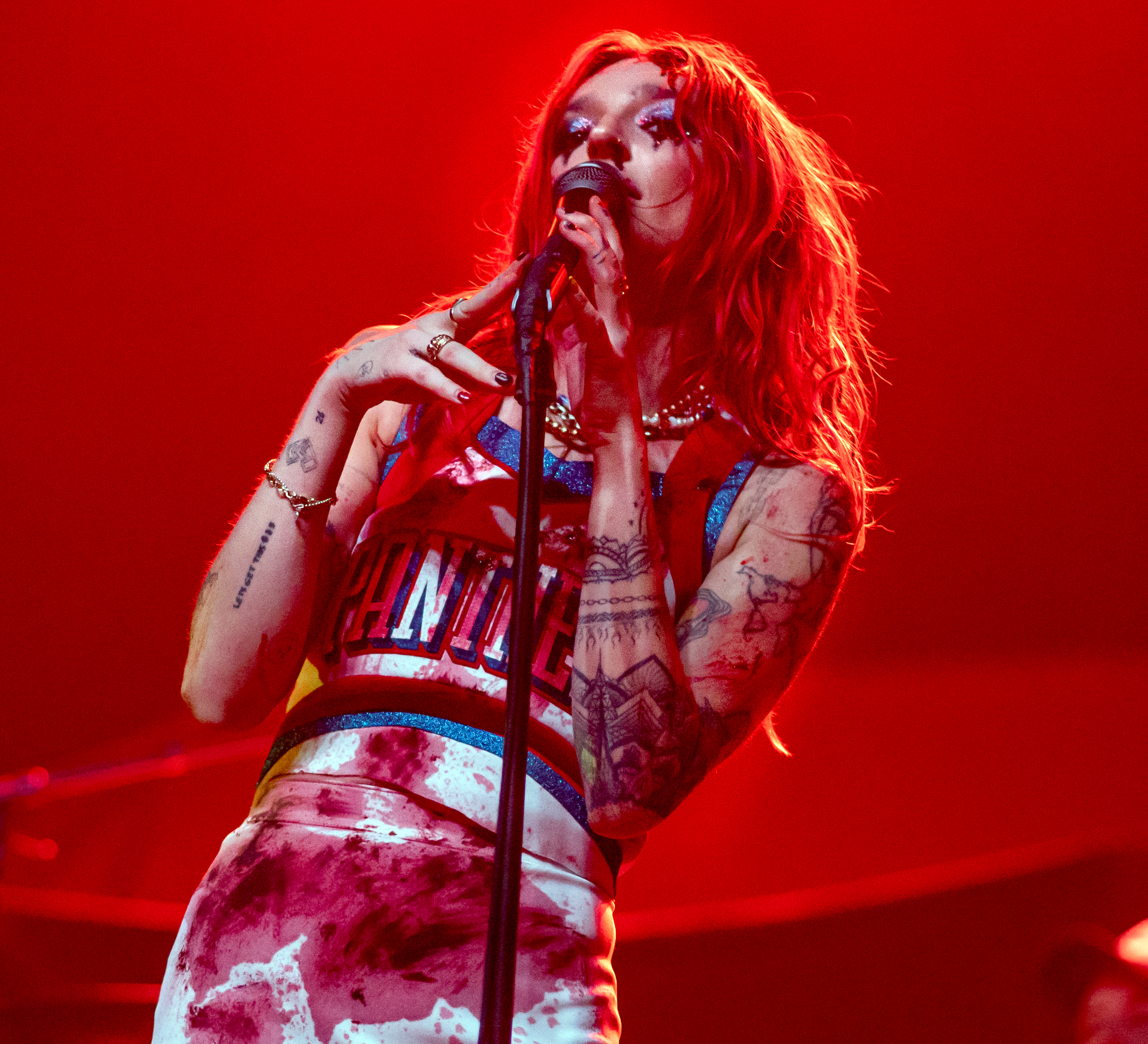
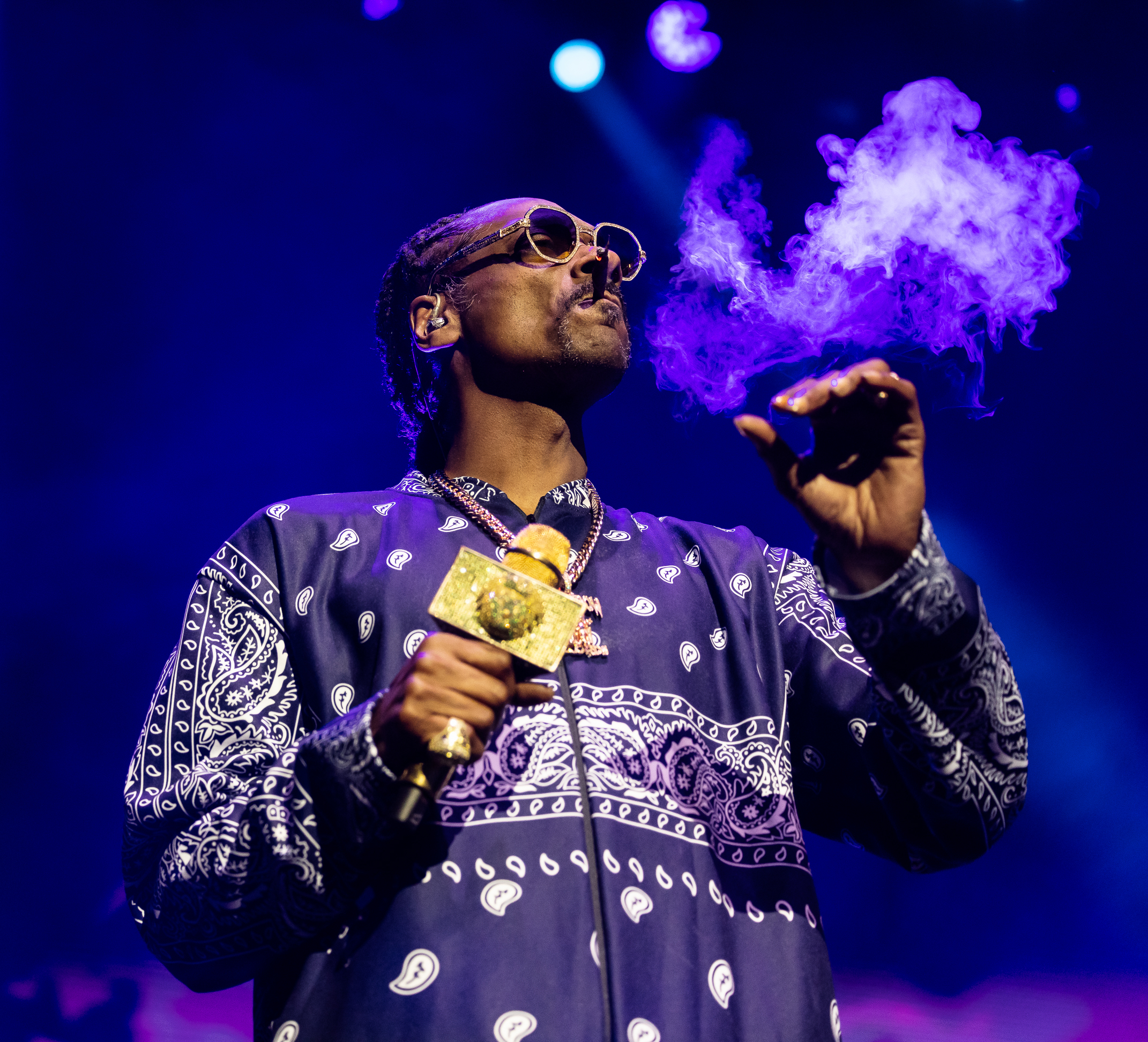
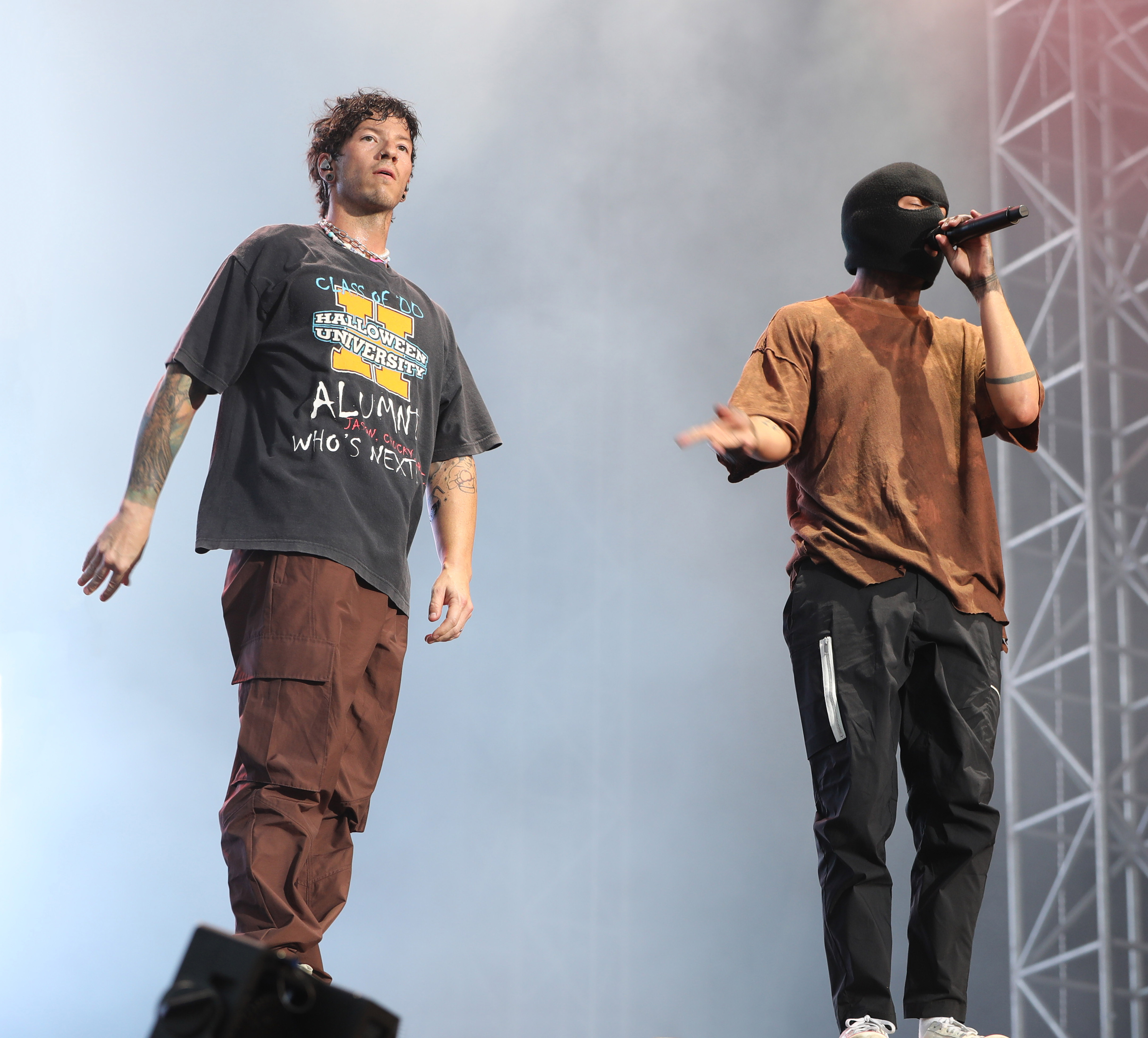
The Game Awards 2024 featured performances from (clockwise from top) d4vd, Royal & the Serpent, Twenty One Pilots, and Snoop Dogg.

The Game Awards Orchestra, conducted by Lorne Balfe, performed during the ceremony, including Pedro Eustache, dubbed "Flute Guy". Balfe remained updated on new game releases throughout the year to ensure he was familiar with their music when the nominees were announced. He worked with David Campbell to arrange a performance of songs from the second season of Arcane. Snoop Dogg debuted a new song during the show.

The following individuals or groups performed musical numbers.

Name	Song	Game(s) / show(s)
The Game Awards Orchestra (Note: Conducted by Lorne Balfe)	"Live Gloriously"	Civilization VII
d4vd	"Remember Me"	Arcane
Royal & the Serpent	"Wasteland"	Arcane
Twenty One Pilots	"The Line"	Arcane
Snoop Dogg	"Thank You"	—N/a (Note: Snoop Dogg's performance followed his appearance in Fortnite and preceded the release of his album Missionary the following day.)
Snoop Dogg	"Gin and Juice"	—N/a
The Game Awards Orchestra	"Rising Sun"	Untitled Ōkami sequel
The Game Awards Orchestra	Game of the Year medley (Note: The Game of the Year medley's songs included: "Warriors in Valour" from Metaphor: ReFantazio; "The Twin Moon Knight" from Elden Ring Shadow of the Erdtree; "Main Theme" from Balatro; "Gatcha" with elements of "I Am Astro Bot [ASTRO BOT Remix]" from Astro Bot; "Main Theme" from Black Myth: Wukong; "Main Theme of FFVII - Battle Edit" from Final Fantasy VII Rebirth)	Astro Bot
The Game Awards Orchestra	Game of the Year medley	Balatro
The Game Awards Orchestra	Game of the Year medley	Black Myth: Wukong
The Game Awards Orchestra	Game of the Year medley	Elden Ring Shadow of the Erdtree
The Game Awards Orchestra	Game of the Year medley	Final Fantasy VII Rebirth
The Game Awards Orchestra	Game of the Year medley	Metaphor: ReFantazio

== Reception ==
=== Nominees ===
Several games saw increased weekly sales following their nominations, including Final Fantasy VII Rebirth by 268% and Metaphor: ReFantazio by 172%, and Balatro had its second-highest-earning week on mobile and a 100% increase in concurrent players on Steam. Balatro's nominations pleasantly surprised critics due to its genre, though some felt other indie games remained overlooked outside of their dedicated categories. TheGamer's Stacey Henley appreciated that Games for Impact "can finally feel like part of the show" as, unlike previous years, some of its nominees were also named in other categories, though The Guardian's Keza MacDonald found its nominees incongruous and criteria confusing. Some felt three of the five Players' Voice nominees being gacha games justified the lack of more audience-voted categories.

The omission of Future Class was criticized; TheGamer's Tessa Kaur called it "a loss for the industry", and Digital Trends's Giovanni Colantonio considered it a troubling indication that Keighley was attempting to avoid controversy and placate the audience in light of an open letter written by Future Class inductees before the 2023 ceremony. Some critics were puzzled by Silent Hill 2's Best Narrative nomination as it is a remake of a 2001 game. Dragon Age: The Veilguard, EA Sports College Football 25, and The Legend of Zelda: Echoes of Wisdom were considered among the biggest snubs by some critics and viewers.

Many journalists and viewers criticized Elden Ring: Shadow of the Erdtree's Game of the Year nomination as it overshadowed other games, though some felt it was justified by its quality and size. The show's website was updated before nominees were announced to clarify DLC's eligibility, which many predicted was in preparation for Shadow of the Erdtree's divisive nominations; some viewers erroneously accused Keighley of changing the rules to make it eligible. Others also felt its eligibility meant DLC was snubbed at previous shows, like Cyberpunk 2077: Phantom Liberty and Xenoblade Chronicles 3: Future Redeemed in 2023, and suggested a new category dedicated to DLC would be more appropriate, though TheGamer's Henley argued there are too few annual releases to justify it.

Some journalists considered Black Myth: Wukong an outlier in the Game of the Year nominees and were surprised by its success; it is the lowest-scoring Game of the Year nominee in the show's history, with 81 out of 100 on review aggregator website Metacritic. TheGamer's Tessa Kaur felt the game's biggest accomplishment was its popularity, comparing it to Barbie's Best Picture nomination at the Academy Awards. Conversely, Vice's Dwayne Jenkins criticized journalists who questioned its deservedness based solely on its critical reception, despite the positive player response; he argued that such discussions are more appropriate for audiences rather than journalists, who should serve as neutral intermediaries, since the awards have no objective criteria.

=== Ceremony ===
The Washington Post's Gene Park called the 2024 ceremony "the best show put on by the Game Awards so far this decade", though he felt the categories required better curation, and Engadget's Mat Smith wrote that "the Game Awards delivered". VentureBeat's Dean Takahashi thought Keighley "redeemed himself" after criticism of the previous ceremony, and Push Square's Sammy Barker felt he deserved credit for responding to past criticism, even if some problems remained. Digital Trends's Colantonio called it "the best possible version" of the show, though he criticized the relegation of important awards to the preshow. Rolling Stone's Issy van der Velde similarly criticized that the esports winners were announced in quick succession during the preshow without acceptance speeches, and TheGamer's Kaur felt the show remained too long and padded with boring advertisements, though found the reveals surprising "for the first time in a long time".

Journalists deemed the winners deserving, including Astro Bot's Game of the Year award considering its polished and joyful gameplay; the game's sales saw an increase after its win, according to estimates published by Alinea Analytics. Many writers considered the game announcements surprising and among the best to date; The Guardian's MacDonald compared it to "an old-school E3 conference". Viewers responded negatively to Catly's reveal trailer; the developer denied claims of generative AI and blockchain technology, and shared a draft version of the trailer with journalists. The musical performances were praised; NME's Surej Singh called the Arcane performance an "emotional and stirring medley". Several commentators appreciated the additional time for acceptance speeches, following criticism at the previous ceremony. Kotaku's Zack Zwiezen considered Statler and Waldorf the highlight for their humorous interjections and heckles directed at Keighley, though TheGamer's Kaur felt their appearance acknowledged the show's issues without addressing them.

Many considered the Game Changer award and Amir Satvat's emotional acceptance speech the show's highlight; Rolling Stone's Van der Velde thought the award meant Keighley was taking criticism seriously, though TheGamer's Kaur and Henley felt its introduction in the same year as Future Class's removal gave the appearance of awarding individuals to reduce the voice of a collective group. Some Future Class members were concerned the award had replaced the program as "it's easier to control one person's message than the message of multiple years Future Class members". Some viewers suggested Satvat's role at Tencent made him "part of the problem" with layoffs. Four days after the show, Satvat said he had received "countless hateful messages", including antisemitic comments directed at his wife. Journalists praised Swen Vincke's speech criticizing publishers who chase "arbitrary sales targets" instead of making games "they want to play".

Some viewers interpreted Vincke's comments as criticism of Black Myth: Wukong, which was partially attributed to a poor Chinese translation of his speech; some subsequently attempted to review bomb Vincke's game, Baldur's Gate 3, on Steam, as well as Astro Bot on Metacritic. Alanah Pearce said that a Black Myth: Wukong developer cried after failing to win Game of the Year, though former IGN China editor-in-chief Charles Young said he was with the developers at the show and none cried. Following the ceremony, the game's producer Feng Ji expressed disappointment over the loss and confusion about the award's criteria, writing "I feel like I came all the way here for nothing!"; (Note: Translated from Chinese; original text reads "我特么白来了!".) he said he had written his acceptance speech two years earlier. Some foreign media interpreted Feng Ji's comments as criticism of the Game Awards, which was attributed to machine translations misconstruing the meaning, self-deprecation, and humorous tone of the original Chinese text.

=== Viewership ===
An estimated 154 million viewers watched the ceremony, the most in the show's history to date and a 31% increase from the previous year. Its figures surpassed the average viewers of the Super Bowl by 30 million, the Academy Awards sevenfold, the Grammy Awards ninefold, and the World Series tenfold. Referencing the viewing figures, Reggie Fils-Aimé called the show "the biggest global entertainment event of our time", though TheGamer's Kaur considered the claim disingenuous, citing the FIFA World Cup finals and Olympic Games, and the fact that shows like the Super Bowl are generally viewed in groups rather than individually.

According to Streams Charts, the ceremony peaked at over four million concurrent viewers—the most in its history to date and a 10% increase from 2023—across 1,498 channels, including 1.25 million viewers on the official YouTube broadcast and 397,000 on Twitch. More than 15,900 content creators co-streamed the event, including over 11,000 on Twitch and a record 4,500 on YouTube. On YouTube, the ceremony peaked at 2.17 million concurrent viewers (a 28% increase), with over 1.3 million on the official channel (a 35% increase). On Twitter, usage of the hashtag #TheGameAwards increased by 150%, with more than 1.59 million posts receiving 6.79 billion impressions.
