= Solasta II =

- Developer: Tactical Adventures
- Publisher: Kepler Interactive
- Engine: Unreal Engine 5
- Platform: Windows
- Release: March 12, 2026 (early access)
- Genre: Tactical role-playing
- Modes: Single-player, multiplayer

Solasta II is an upcoming tactical role-playing video game developed by Tactical Adventures and published by Kepler Interactive. It is the sequel to Solasta: Crown of the Magister (2021). An early access version of the game was released for Windows in March 2026.

== Gameplay ==
Solasta II is a tactical role-playing video game. Players control a party of characters as they explore the continent of Neokos, and combat in the game is turn-based. The story follows four Colwall siblings, who set out to defeat a mysterious entity named Shadwyn following the death of their mother. While it is not set in the Dungeons and Dragons franchise, it used the rule systems of its fifth edition. The game has six main classes, with each further branching into two to three additional subclasses. The game also supports four-player cooperative multiplayer.

== Development ==
Solasta II is currently being developed by Tactical Adventures, which had around 50 employees. Unlike the first game, which was made with Unity, Solasta II was created with Unreal Engine. The team decided to set the game in a new continent in order to keep the experience fresh for returning players and invoke a sense of discovery, and the team introduced a number of new races, factions and locations for the sequel. Studio head Mathieu Girard added that Solasta II told a "story of a family", and that the team recruited several high-profile voice actors such as Ben Starr, Devora Wilde, Amelia Tyler, and Ellen Thomas to voice the game's characters.

In 2025, Tactical Adventures announced that it had become the ninth independent studio to join the collective of studios that co-own Kepler Interactive. Solasta II was announced in December 2024 during The Game Awards. A gameplay demo was released during Steam Next Fest in February 2025. It was released for Windows via early access on March 12, 2026.
