= Catly =

- Developer: SuperAuthenti
- Engine: Unreal Engine 5
- Platforms: Apple Watch; Nintendo Switch; Windows
- Genres: Platform, adventure
- Modes: Single-player, multiplayer

Catly (stylized as Cátly) is an upcoming platformer game developed by SuperAuthenti, set to release for Steam, Nintendo Switch and Apple Watch. Following its announcement on The Game Awards 2024 in December, Catly was subject of criticism over allegations of generative artificial intelligence use for the first trailer and blockchain technologies for the game.

== Gameplay ==
Catly is an adventure game with an open world architecture. It has single-player and multiplayer options. In Catly, players can customize a cat avatar, care for it, and explore environments. Gameplay also includes farming simulator and island-building elements.

== Development ==
Catly is developed by studio SuperAuthenti and was made in Unreal Engine 5. The game was unveiled with a teaser trailer on December 12, 2024 during The Game Awards 2024 presentations. SuperAuthenti announced the release for PC (via Steam), Nintendo Switch and Apple Watch. A trailer showcasing gameplay was launched on Catly's Steam page on December 19.

=== Allegations of artificial intelligence and blockchain technology use ===
Following the game's announcement, assertions circulated that the game or the trailer were created through generative artificial intelligence (AI) technology. The rumours pointed at the trailer's hyperrealistic style, to the apparent presence of AI artifacts in the promotional material, and to the removal of images from the game's website. An aspect commented upon was the vagueness in the game's Steam description, which read "A Cat Open World, with Beautiful Cats. Hyperrealism, Actions, Cuddle, Speed, Islands, Fashion, Dreams, Snow, Robots, Plants -- all with and via Cats." The description was since changed.

SuperAuthenti stated that they did not use generative AI technology for the trailer or game, and that they believed AI tools at the time could not produce a trailer "like that". IGN and Game Developer were shown in-progress material for the game's trailer; both outlets appeared to confirm a lack of generative AI use for the trailer. Online personalities Pokimane, Ninja and Felicia Day promoted the game on Twitter; Pokimane retracted her tweet upon discovery of the allegations.

Rumors alleging Catly's use of blockchain technologies surfaced upon investigations of previous activities by SuperAuthenti co-founder Kevin Yeung. Yeung had reportedly worked on two blockchain-based games under the studio TenthPlanet, as stated in a 2022 VentureBeat article, before co-founding SuperAuthenti. Another point that was emphasized was that Catly's Steam listing featured a testimonial quote from League of Legends and Arcane producer Thomas Vu, a Web3 investor. The SuperAuthenti team said they would not involve blockchain technologies or non-fungible tokens (NFTs) in the game.
