= Amir Satvat =

American business executive

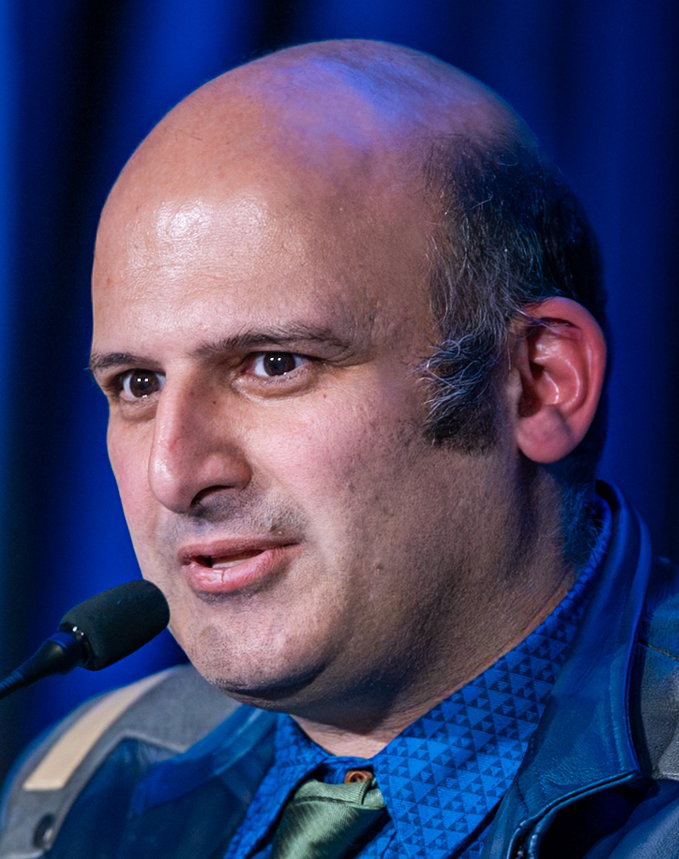
- Satvat at the Game Developers Conference in 2026
- Born: April 1, 1982 (age 44)
- Occupation: Business executive
- Employers: Amazon Inc. (2019–2023); Tencent Games (2023–2026); 1Up Ventures (2026–present)
- Spouse: Jessica Leight (m. 2013)

Amir Satvat is an American business executive. He has been a general partner at 1Up Ventures since 2026, and previously served as a business development director at Tencent Games from 2023 to 2026. He is known for his volunteer efforts in helping jobseekers and laid-off workers find positions in the video game industry.

His efforts in helping jobseekers began in November 2022 on his LinkedIn page, as a spreadsheet of video game job listings scraped from the web. This has since expanded to become a wider network of 14 job-seeking resources and support across multiple platforms. His community's efforts have helped over 5,000 people find work in the industry.

== Early life ==
Amir Satvat was born on April 1, 1982, to Ashraf Owlia Satvat and Behzad Satvat of Avon, Connecticut. Satvat grew up in Farmington, Connecticut, where he continues to live with his family and work remotely from. He graduated from the Loomis Chaffee School in 2000 and went on to receive a bachelor's degree in finance from Boston College. Satvat spent five years in graduate school to pursue three master's degrees; a degree in biotechnology from the University of Pennsylvania, a Master of Business Administration in healthcare administration from the Wharton School, and a Master of Public Administration in health policy from New York University. Satvat married Jessica Ellen Leight on April 13, 2013, at the Peabody Essex Museum in Salem, Massachusetts, officiated by Leight's father.

== Professional career ==
Having aspired to work on video games since the age of four, Satvat began applying for roles in the video game industry after graduating from college. While positions were available at the time, they were mostly based on the West Coast, and Satvat was not willing to leave his family and friends in the New England area, which he has described as the "only thing that trumped games".

While continuing to seek a career in video games, Satvat spent 15 years working in other fields, including as an investment banking analyst at Goldman Sachs, along with various business development, strategy and operations roles at Dell EMC, VMware, and Veeam. He joined Amazon Inc. in 2019 as a chief operating officer in their Amazon Web Services cloud sales center. A year later, Satvat landed his first role in the game industry, after transferring into Prime Gaming as a business development lead. He later became a principal publishing producer with Amazon Games's Montreal studio. In August 2023, he left Amazon to join Tencent Games as a business development director. He left Tencent in September 2026 to join 1Up Ventures as a general partner.

Satvat began his efforts helping others seek jobs in November 2022 after a Thanksgiving dinner, where he heard from friends who had received layoff notices just before the holiday and wanted an easier way to search for jobs. Realizing he could leverage his skills in spreadsheet macros and web scraping to help, Satvat compiled a spreadsheet containing hundreds of job listings and posted it to his LinkedIn page. To simplify the process for jobseekers, the listings are publicly accessible through a Google Sheet, where they are broken down into 20 common categories and automatically updated each month. The spreadsheet has since grown to include over 15,000 postings as of September 2024.

Satvat's efforts expanded to become Amir Satvat's Games Community, which he maintains with a group of volunteers. They now operate a wider network of 14 job-seeking resources and support across multiple platforms, which include job boards and mentorship programs. In June 2026, GamesBeat reported that the community had assisted 5,000 people in finding jobs in gaming, had received more than seven million lifetime visitors, and had involved more than 10,000 people in supporting jobseekers. In December 2025, Satvat announced that the community would be renamed to ASGC, standing for Always Supporting the Games Community, reflecting its evolution from a founder-led initiative into a shared, volunteer-run network intended to endure beyond any single individual.

Satvat is a member of the advisory network at Vivrato, a strategic advisory organization for the games industry founded by Adam Boyes. He also serves as a special advisor to the Zero Abuse Project, an organization dedicated to ending child abuse through education and advocacy. His Games Community participates annually in Gamers for CHOC, a fundraising campaign supporting the Children's Hospital of Orange County.

== Recognition ==
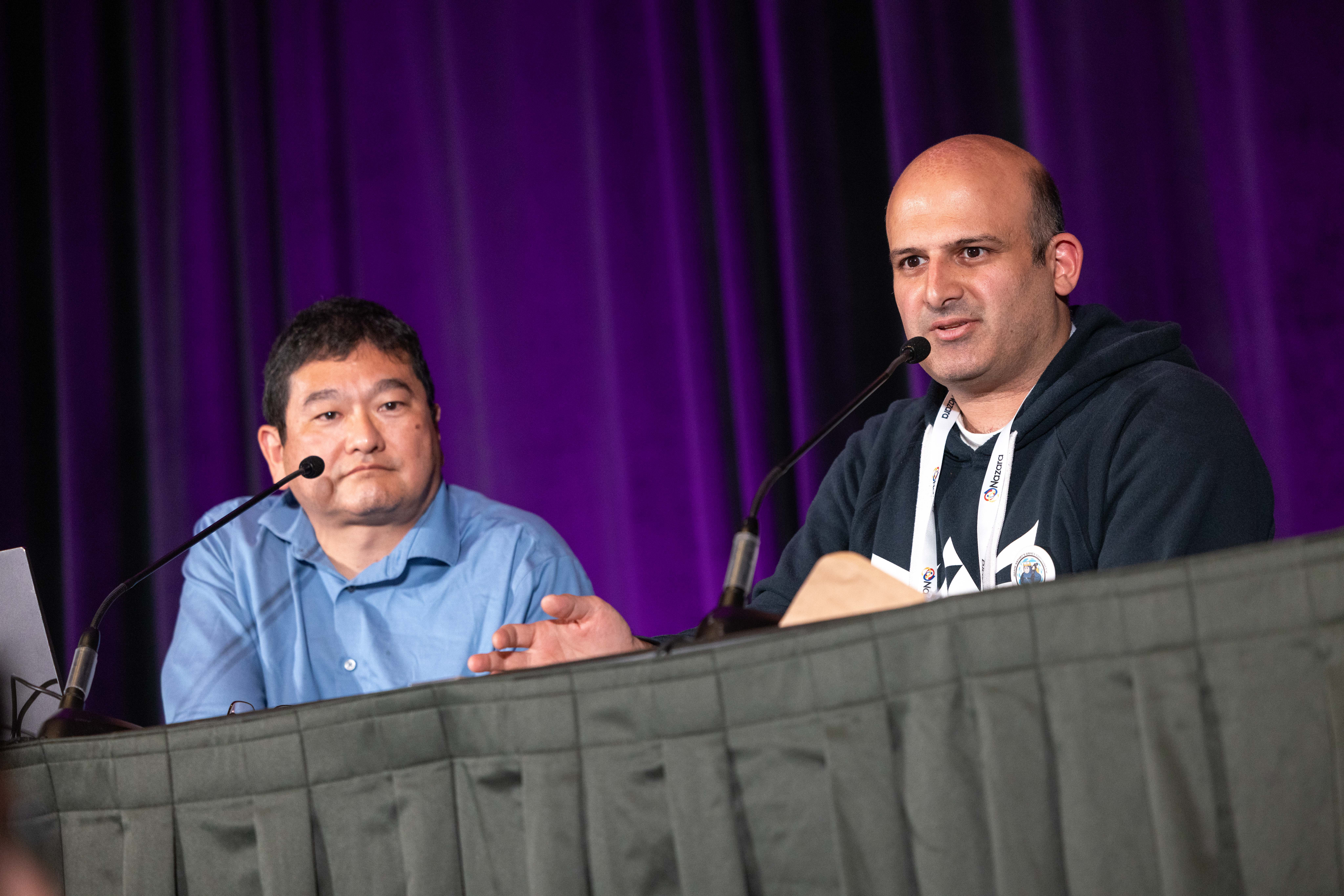
Satvat (right) with Dean Takahashi at the Game Developers Conference in 2025

Satvat was presented with the inaugural Game Changer Award at the Game Awards 2024, a new accolade introduced to recognize individuals who have had a positive impact on the game industry. Many considered Satvat's emotional acceptance speech the highlight of the event. Some viewers suggested Satvat's role at Tencent made him "part of the problem" with layoffs and criticized the ceremony's failure to mention it. Four days after the show, Satvat said he had received "countless hateful messages", including antisemitic comments directed at his wife. He further stated that he has never laid off workers nor worked on "mergers and acquisitions at Tencent or Amazon".

In 2025, Satvat received the Giving Award from Games for Change, an honor recognizing individuals, companies, or organizations making meaningful contributions to the community through initiatives such as fundraising, scholarships, and career support. He was also honored with the inaugural Industry Impact Award from Game Dev Heroes for helping thousands find work during one of the industry’s most difficult periods. That year, Amir Satvat's Games Community was named an official Industry and Media Partner of the Game Developers Conference, contributing 240 Expo Passes valued at over $100,000 to support jobseekers. His community was also recognized as the largest grassroots career support initiative in the video game industry through its inclusion in the Gamescom Cares program. Satvat delivered a keynote speech at the 2025 External Development Summit, a global conference on external development in the video game industry. He was also the recipient of the Unsung Hero Award at XDS 2025, in recognition of his contributions to community building, knowledge sharing, and support for professionals in external development and the wider video game industry.

Since 2023, Satvat has been recognized as a LinkedIn Top Voice in Video Games, an honor awarded to members whose content fosters sustained engagement and community impact. In May 2026, he received GamesBeat's Up-and-Comer Award, part of its annual Visionary Awards program recognizing leaders who are shaping the future of interactive entertainment. In June, Satvat was announced as the opening keynote speaker for Gamescom Dev 2026, and in August he received the Gamescom Dev Ambassador Award for his support in the industry.
