= Gris =

2018 adventure-platform game

- Cover art, showing the game's protagonist
- Developer: Nomada Studio
- Publisher: Devolver Digital
- Director: Conrad Roset
- Producer: Roger Mendoza
- Designers: Óscar Crego; Daniel Cuadrado González
- Programmer: Adrián Cuevas
- Artist: Conrad Roset
- Composer: Berlinist
- Engine: Unity
- Platforms: macOS; Nintendo Switch; Windows; iOS; PlayStation 4; Android; PlayStation 5; Xbox One; Xbox Series X/S
- Release: macOS, Nintendo Switch, Windows; 13 December 2018; iOS; 21 August 2019; PlayStation 4; 26 November 2019; Android; 1 April 2020; PlayStation 5, Xbox One, Xbox Series X/S; 13 December 2022
- Genre: Platform-adventure
- Mode: Single-player

Gris (Spanish pronunciation: [ɡɾis]) is a 2018 platform-adventure game by Spanish developer Nomada Studio and published by Devolver Digital. The game was released for macOS, Nintendo Switch, and Windows in December 2018, for iOS in August 2019, for PlayStation 4 in November 2019, for Android in April 2020, for Amazon Luna in November 2021, and for PlayStation 5, Xbox One and Xbox Series X/S in December 2022. The game has sold over 3 million copies.

== Synopsis ==
Gris in the palm of the statue where she wakes up

The game follows a girl named Gris, who wakes up in the palm of a crumbling statue of a woman. She attempts to sing out, but becomes choked up, and the statue's hands crumble, dropping her to the colourless earth below. After landing, she continues walking forward and discovers a number of strange structures that seem to be powered by mysterious points of light resembling stars. Gris can collect these lights to gain new abilities, such as turning into a heavy block of stone and creating pathways made of constellations.

After reaching a central tower, Gris can travel to four locations to collect lights and restore colour back to her world at statues resembling the broken one from the beginning of the story. These areas include a desert filled with windmills, a lush forest, underwater caverns, and a world with buildings made of light. Along the way she encounters various living beings, some of which help her on her journey, as well as an inky black monster which manifests as large creatures that threaten to consume her. The final power Gris obtains is the ability to sing again, which brings life to various plants and mechanical animals. In addition, hints throughout the story via other statues similar to the first reveal that the woman that Gris constantly grieves in front of is her deceased mother.

Gris collects enough stars to form a constellation path to the heavens, but the final pathway is blocked by the creature, who morphs into a monstrous form of herself and swallows her whole. She wakes up in an ocean of toxic black sludge and swims to the surface. As she climbs a tower rising out of the ocean, the creature tries to pull her back. However, Gris begins singing, and her mother's statue begins to reform itself through the power of her voice. Just as she is completely consumed by the black oil, the statue of Gris's mother comes alive and begins singing as well, banishing the creature and the sea of despair. Encouraged by her mother's song, Gris continues to sing and the duet fully restores the world back to its beauty and colour. Gris and her mother tearfully embrace, with Gris giving a farewell kiss and she climbs the final constellation path into the light and the unknown, having accepted her mother's death and moving forward with the knowledge of her mother's love still being with her.

If all mementos are collected, Gris's childhood is revealed in a secret room. It is nighttime. A child Gris is in the meadows with her mother. Gris's mother encloses a firefly between her hands, then releases it to fly around child Gris. Then under the bright full moon child Gris and her mother embrace.

== Development ==
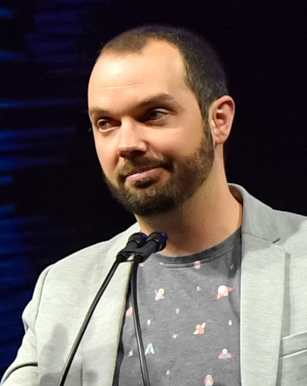
Adrián Cuevas, the programmer for Gris, in 2019

Gris was developed by Nomada Studio, a Barcelona-based company which was formed after a chance meeting between two Ubisoft employees, Roger Mendoza and Adrián Cuevas, and artist Conrad Roset. The two met Roset while attending a going away party held for Cuevas who was temporarily moving to Ubisoft Montreal to work on Rainbow Six Siege. Roset noted to Mendoza and Cuevas that he was interested in working on video games, at the time the two were interested in creating an independent game but lacked the artistic skills, so the three decided to form Nomada Studio.

Intending the game to be "a mix of Journey and Ori and the Blind Forest", the game was designed with accessibility in mind. As such there are no fail states, a decision that proved to be challenging. Mendoza has described their approach as "If there's a puzzle you can probably finish it at the second or third try. When the puzzle is more complicated, we give the player options." Partway through development the team consulted with a psychologist about the game's narrative themes of grief (especially the five stages of grief) and depression, resulting in gameplay decisions to echo the turmoil of the main character. An example of this is how at the beginning of the game the player is unable to jump which helps reinforce the notion that "something is wrong with this girl".

The art style created some unique problems for the developers. Since the game becomes more lively as players progress designing the early areas in an appealing way proved challenging. The team eventually solved this problem by taking inspiration from Iwagumi style aquariums. Another challenging issue was readability, which resulted in several level design and camera angle tweaks during development. Initially the main character's dress was going to change as more colors became unlocked, however this eventually proved impractical due partly to the camera angles. The game's title refers to the name of the protagonist, as well as the Spanish word for the colour grey.

== Reception ==
Reception

Aggregate score
Aggregator	Score
Metacritic	PC: 84/100; NS: 83/100; PS4: 82/100

Review scores
Publication	Score
Destructoid	10/10
Electronic Gaming Monthly	8/10
Eurogamer	4/5
Game Informer	8.25/10
GameSpot	9/10
IGN	6.5/10
Jeuxvideo.com	16/20
Nintendo Life	9/10
USgamer	3/5
VideoGamer.com	6/10

Gris received "generally favorable" reviews, according to review aggregator Metacritic.

EGMNow wrote that "with an arresting art style and admirable commitment to minimalist game design, Gris manages to turn a straightforward, often derivative platformer into something that feels far more special and important."

GameSpot stated "Gris understands intrinsically how magical video games can be and continually pushes your imagination until you're almost bursting with joy. The ways in which it reinvents itself as you gain powers and dive ever deeper into this world is truly special, and just as it knows exactly when to pull back the camera or introduce a new song, it's keenly aware of when it's time to say goodbye. Like a comet streaking across the sky, Gris is full of wonder and beauty and leaves you with a warm glow in your heart."

Apple stated "This spectacularly satisfying puzzle-platformer is a soul-stirring work of digital art—one that explores hope, grief and the triumph of piecing a life back together after tragic loss" and awarded it Mac Game of the Year in 2019.

=== Sales ===
Gris's sales exceeded 300,000 units by March 2019, one million by April 2020, and three million by September 2024.

=== Accolades ===
Year	Award	Category	Result	Ref.
2019	New York Game Awards	Off Broadway Award for Best Indie Game	Nominated	
2019	46th Annie Awards	Character Animation in a Video Game	Won	
2019	22nd Annual D.I.C.E. Awards	Outstanding Achievement in Animation	Nominated	
2019	22nd Annual D.I.C.E. Awards	Outstanding Achievement in Art Direction	Nominated	
2019	National Academy of Video Game Trade Reviewers Awards	Animation, Artistic	Nominated	
2019	National Academy of Video Game Trade Reviewers Awards	Art Direction, Contemporary	Won	
2019	National Academy of Video Game Trade Reviewers Awards	Original Light Mix Score, New IP	Nominated	
2019	SXSW Gaming Awards	Excellence in Art	Nominated	
2019	SXSW Gaming Awards	Excellence in Visual Achievement	Nominated	
2019	SXSW Gaming Awards	Excellence in Musical Score	Nominated	
2019	SXSW Gaming Awards	Most Promising New Intellectual Property	Nominated	
2019	19th Game Developers Choice Awards	Best Debut (Nomada Studio)	Nominated	
2019	19th Game Developers Choice Awards	Best Visual Art	Won	
2019	15th British Academy Games Awards	Artistic Achievement	Nominated	
2019	15th British Academy Games Awards	Debut Game	Nominated	
2019	15th British Academy Games Awards	Music	Nominated	
2019	Italian Video Game Awards	Best Art Direction	Nominated	
2019	Italian Video Game Awards	Best Indie Game	Won	
2019	Italian Video Game Awards	Game Beyond Entertainment	Nominated	
2019	2019 Webby Awards	Best Visual Design	Won	
2019	Games for Change Awards	Best Gameplay	Won	
2019	Golden Joystick Awards	Best Visual Design	Nominated	
2019	Titanium Awards	Best Art	Won	
2019	Titanium Awards	Best Spanish Development	Nominated	
2019	The Game Awards 2019	Best Art Direction	Nominated	
2019	The Game Awards 2019	Games for Impact	Won	
2019	The Game Awards 2019	Fresh Indie Game (Nomada Studio)	Nominated	
2019	The Steam Awards	The "Outstanding Visual Style" Award	Won	

== Legacy ==
In 2021, GQ España named Gris one of the best Spanish-made games ever.

== See also ==
- Neva, the studio's next game
