= BrolyLegs =

American professional esports player (1988–2024)

- Born: Michael Phillip Begum; April 26, 1988; Brownsville, Texas, U.S.
- Died: March 2024 (aged 35)

Twitch information
- Channel: BrolyLegs
- Years active: 2017–2024
- Followers: 11.8 thousand

Esports career information
- Games: Street Fighter V; Ultra Street Fighter IV; Super Smash Bros. Melee
- Last updated: March 21, 2024

Michael Phillip Begum (April 26, 1988 – c. March 19, 2024), better known as BrolyLegs, was an American professional fighting game player primarily known for competing in Street Fighter. Begum's accolades as a competitive player include being ranked the #1 Chun-Li player online in Ultra Street Fighter IV from 2013 to 2017 and placing #25 in Street Fighter V in the 2022 Evolution Championship Series (EVO). He was affiliated with the AbleGamers charity and was a member of the Street Fighter League.

A disabled gamer, Begum was born with arthrogryposis, which hindered his muscle and joint growth and rendered him immobile. Playing video games at a young age, he developed a technique for gripping and pressing buttons on video game controllers with his face. He began his competitive gaming career in his adolescence by participating in tournaments for Super Smash Bros. with his brother. He was a competitive fighting game player for over fifteen years, and stated that competitive gaming had allowed him to pursue opportunities that he otherwise would never have had.

In addition to competitive gaming, Begum worked as an online coach for fighting games. He also streamed on Twitch and wrote an autobiography called My Life Beyond the Floor.

== Early and personal life ==
Michael Phillip Begum was born on April 26, 1988, (Note: "@Brolylegs" (Mike Begum) on X (formerly Twitter)) to Josefine Begum and Michael Begum Sr, and was a native of Brownsville, Texas. His father was a welder and mechanic, and his adoptive paternal grandfather, a Holocaust survivor, built a chain of women's clothing stores after immigrating from the Soviet Union. His parents separated when Begum was six years old, and Begum resided in Brownsville with his father and younger brother Johnny. His father died in January 2009 from a brain aneurysm, leaving Begum and Johnny to live with his mother and younger sister, who had both moved to Houston following the separation. In 2019 he moved with his mother and brother to Austin, Texas shortly before the COVID-19 pandemic.

Begum had arthrogryposis, a rare genetic condition that affected the movement of the joints in his arms and legs, along with impeding his muscle growth. As a result of the condition, he was unable to walk, sit and grab objects. He was also diagnosed with scoliosis, which prevented him from standing. Born with the condition, he was placed in medical care shortly after birth to undergo various surgeries for his limbs, only for doctors to confirm he would never walk. Begum's condition also resulted in him needing assistance throughout his life. His father built various tools and structures to help Begum, such as an electric wheelchair for Begum in middle school. Following his father's death, Begum received care from various caretakers his mother hired before Johnny became legally registered as his caretaker, assisting him with his needs and attending gaming tournaments with him. Despite his need for assistance, Begum developed ways to perform tasks such as writing, typing and texting using his face.

Begum had played video games since he was a child. At the age of two, Begum's parents bought him a Nintendo Entertainment System, and Super Mario Bros. 3 was the first video game he played. Begum stated in a Game Informer interview that in order to access the controller, he would place his wrist on the directional pad and his chin on the buttons. He often played games with his brother where he would operate the controller with his face while his brother held it using his hands; his father would also place the television on the floor in order for Begum to see.

== Career ==
=== History and achievements ===
"I want to be considered one of the best... That's all I want, not to just be recognized as a disabled player but to be seen as a good player. I get that its attached to me, it's part of my legacy. But I want to be more than that, I want to transcend it."

— Mike Begum discussing his legacy as a fighting game player.

Begum began playing video games competitively as a teenager, with one of his first competitive fighting games being Super Smash Bros. in 2004. He regularly attended local Super Smash Bros. Melee tournaments with his brother. Begum's gaming nickname "BrolyLegs" was a reference to the character Broly from the anime Dragon Ball Z, a series he was a fan of as a teenager. In Street Fighter, Begum primarily competed as the character Chun-Li, stating that her abilities matched his playstyle; Begum was able to perform all of her moves despite only being able to efficiently reach some of the gamepad buttons in gameplay.

Begum was a competitive fighting game player for over fifteen years, participating in various gaming tournaments such as DreamHack Dallas, Space City Beatdown, and EVO. Throughout his career, he played against other notable Street Fighter competitors such as Punk during EVO 2022, NuckleDu in a Street Fighter League exhibition match during E3 2019, and Daigo Umehara. Begum was noted for his competitive nature and skill when playing Street Fighter, often being able to place highly in tournaments. He had often expressed his reluctance to make excuses for himself whenever he competed. Publications noted that competitive players often reacted in bewilderment when competing with Begum, mainly due to his impediment. Despite this, Begum often competed with other professional gamers as esports typically lacks the separation of disabled gamers into their own bracket; Luke Winkie of Vice stated that "In BrolyLegs, you have a challenger who's not a mascot, and more than a Make-A-Wish recipient subbed in for one tearful play from scrimmage."

In 2017, Begum became an affiliate of the AbleGamers charity. His van and laptop broke down after he had competed in EVO 2016, and the organization supplied him with a replacement, allowing Begum to partner with them for tournaments. Begum was also a member of the Street Fighter League, a tournament for Street Fighter V. In E3 2019 he partook in an exhibition match for the tournament, and in late June of that year he won $10,000 from the league.

As a competitive gamer, Begum achieved several titles. From 2013 to 2017, he was the #1 ranked Chun-Li player worldwide in the Xbox 360 version of Ultra Street Fighter IV. In EVO 2022, he placed #25 out of over 1,400 contestants in Street Fighter V, making it his best result since first attending the tournament in 2011. Other placements in tournaments include reaching #9 in Space City Beatdown and #17 in DreamHack. Begum stated that he enjoyed playing competitively as a disabled gamer, reflecting on how it gave him opportunities in life such as traveling and accomplishments that he may have never gotten. In 2016, Capcom produced a documentary on Begum's life as a Street Fighter competitive player with disabilities.

=== Technique and views ===
Begum's condition led him to develop a technique for playing video games on controllers not designed for gamers with disabilities. He played video games using his face and mouth. To access the analog stick for movement, he placed his cheek on the left side of the controller, while accessing the buttons via pressing his tongue on his lower lip inside his right cheek. He also took advantage of the flexibility of button remapping that Street Fighter along with other fighting games often include. Despite his ability to play competitively via his technique, Begum had a harder time with games that require the use of buttons on the shoulders, such as shooting games and Super Smash Bros. Melee – the latter game using shoulder buttons for defensive moves. Begum placed 4th in a Melee tournament playing the game using only offensive actions.

Begum shared his appreciation for the strides the video game industry has taken to address disabilities in video games. He used his position as a fighting game player to represent gamers with disabilities, including teaching a disabled gamer from Denmark. He also advocated for custom controllers for disabled gamers, alongside universal button mapping for video games.

== Other ventures ==
Begum worked as an online coach for fighting games. He received rewards as a member of Cross Counter Training, and had coached for games such as Street Fighter, Super Smash Bros. and Guilty Gear. One of his students appeared in EVO 2022 alongside Begum, reaching the top 200 of the tournament.

Begum also streamed on Twitch as another source of income; he had a partnership on the website. He published his autobiography, My Life Beyond the Floor, about how his disability affected his life.

== Death ==
On March 19, 2024, Begum's family announced his death on X. He was 35. No cause was disclosed. Following the announcement of his death, various members of the fighting game community expressed their condolences on social media, including NuckleDu and Maximilian Dood.
