= Dean Takahashi =

American journalist

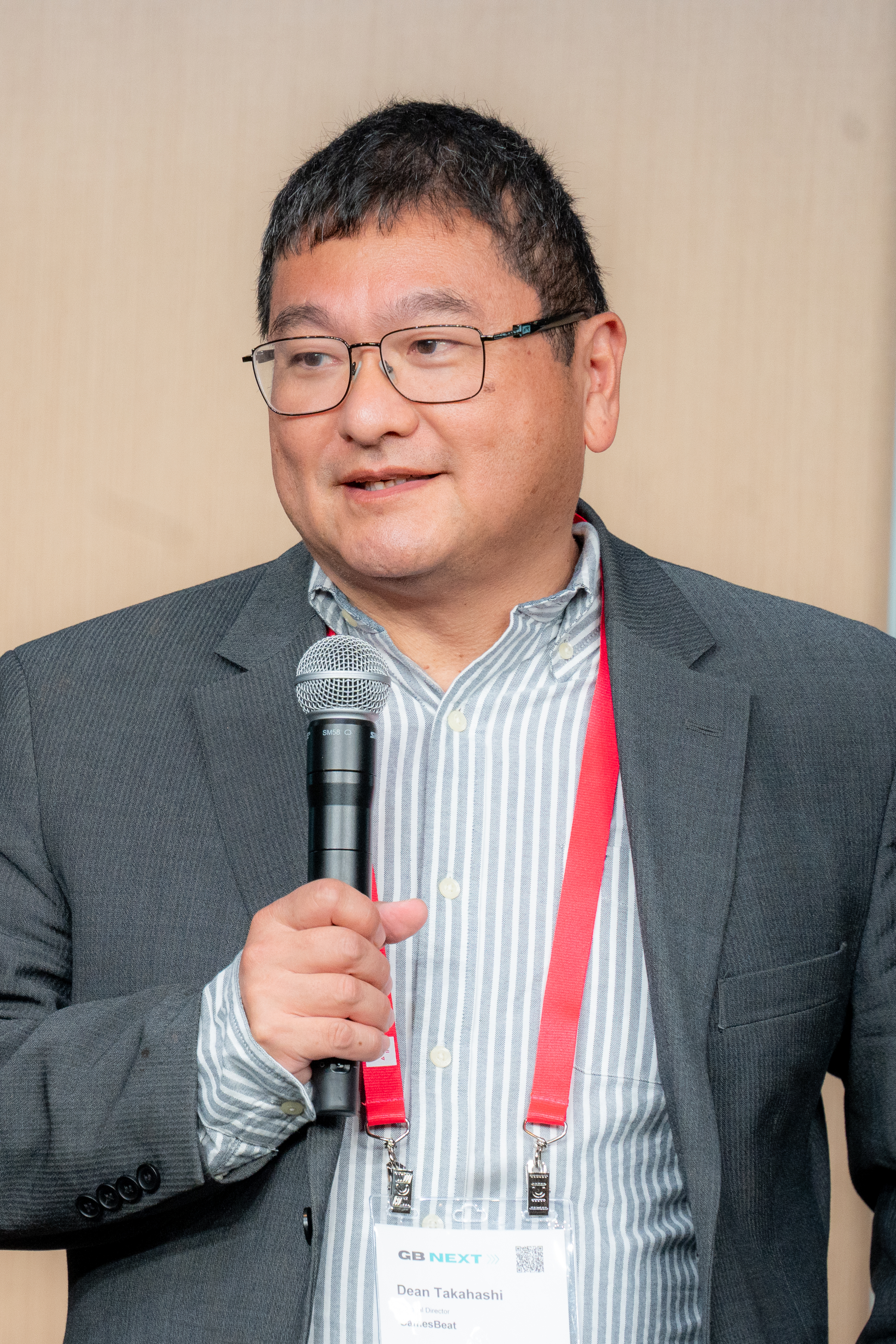
- Takahashi at GamesBeat NEXT 2025
- Born: October 28, 1964 (age 61); Sacramento, California, U.S.
- Occupation: Journalist
- Children: 3

Dean Takahashi (born October 28, 1964) is an American business journalist and author specializing in the tech and video game industries. He is best known as the lead writer for GamesBeat at VentureBeat since 2008.

== Career ==
Takahashi began his journalism career in the late 1980s at the Orange County Register, later working for the Los Angeles Times (Orange County edition) and the Dallas Times Herald. From 1994 to 1996, he was a reporter in the semiconductor industry at the San Jose Mercury News. Between 1996 and 2000, he worked for the San Francisco division of The Wall Street Journal. From 2000 to 2003, he was a senior writer at Red Herring. Between 2002 and 2006, Takahashi wrote two critically acclaimed books on the design of the Xbox and Xbox 360. The first book, Opening the Xbox, was translated into Japanese and French; the second book, The Xbox 360 Uncloaked, was translated into Italian. From 2003 to 2008, he worked as a columnist and journalist covering technology and the video game industry for the San Jose Mercury News. In 2008, Takahashi joined the editorial team at VentureBeat, becoming the first editor of the GamesBeat section dedicated to video games. Also in 2008, he notably published an investigation into the technical issues of the Xbox 360. In 2022, Takahashi reported that "a number of current and former employees" of Moon Studios considered the studio "an oppressive place to work". These allegations were denied by the studio's founders.

== Controversies ==
In 2007, Takahashi published a critical review of the video game Mass Effect, sarcastically renaming it "Mass Defect". He later clarified that his negative experience was due to not knowing it was possible to evolve the character. In 2011, Takahashi faced criticism for stating, in essence, that the game Warhammer 40,000: Space Marine was a clone of Gears of War.

From 2017 onwards, Takahashi became the center of controversies regarding the poor performance of some video game journalists, after he posted videos where he struggled with games like Cuphead and Doom Eternal. It took him 2.5 minutes to complete the Cuphead tutorial, and he was unable to beat the first level after 26 minutes of gameplay. Some observers regarded the criticism against him and other less skilled players as a form of elitism.

In 2020, following an investigation by three French media outlets revealing a "toxic corporate culture" within game development studio Quantic Dream, Takahashi published a counter-investigation. The piece was criticized as biased by some video game journalists, including Cecilia D'Anastasio, and Jason Schreier.

== Personal life ==
Takahashi was born on October 28, 1964, to Japanese American parents Thomas and Hiroko. He had an older brother, Tracy, who was killed by mistake in a shoot-out in 1993. Takahashi lives in the San Francisco Bay Area with his family. He is married and has three daughters.

== Bibliography ==
- Opening the Xbox: Inside Microsoft's Plan to Unleash an Entertainment Revolution. Prima Games. 2002. ISBN 0-7615-3708-2. OL 8018112M. Wikidata Q123906684. Archived from the original on June 4, 2002.
- The Xbox 360 Uncloaked: The Real Story Behind Microsoft's Next-Generation Video Game Console. SpiderWorks. 2006. ISBN 978-0-9777842-1-9. OCLC 70684243. OL 8591774M. Wikidata Q123906567. Archived from the original on July 7, 2006.
