= Duesenberg Twenty Grand =

Twenty Grand
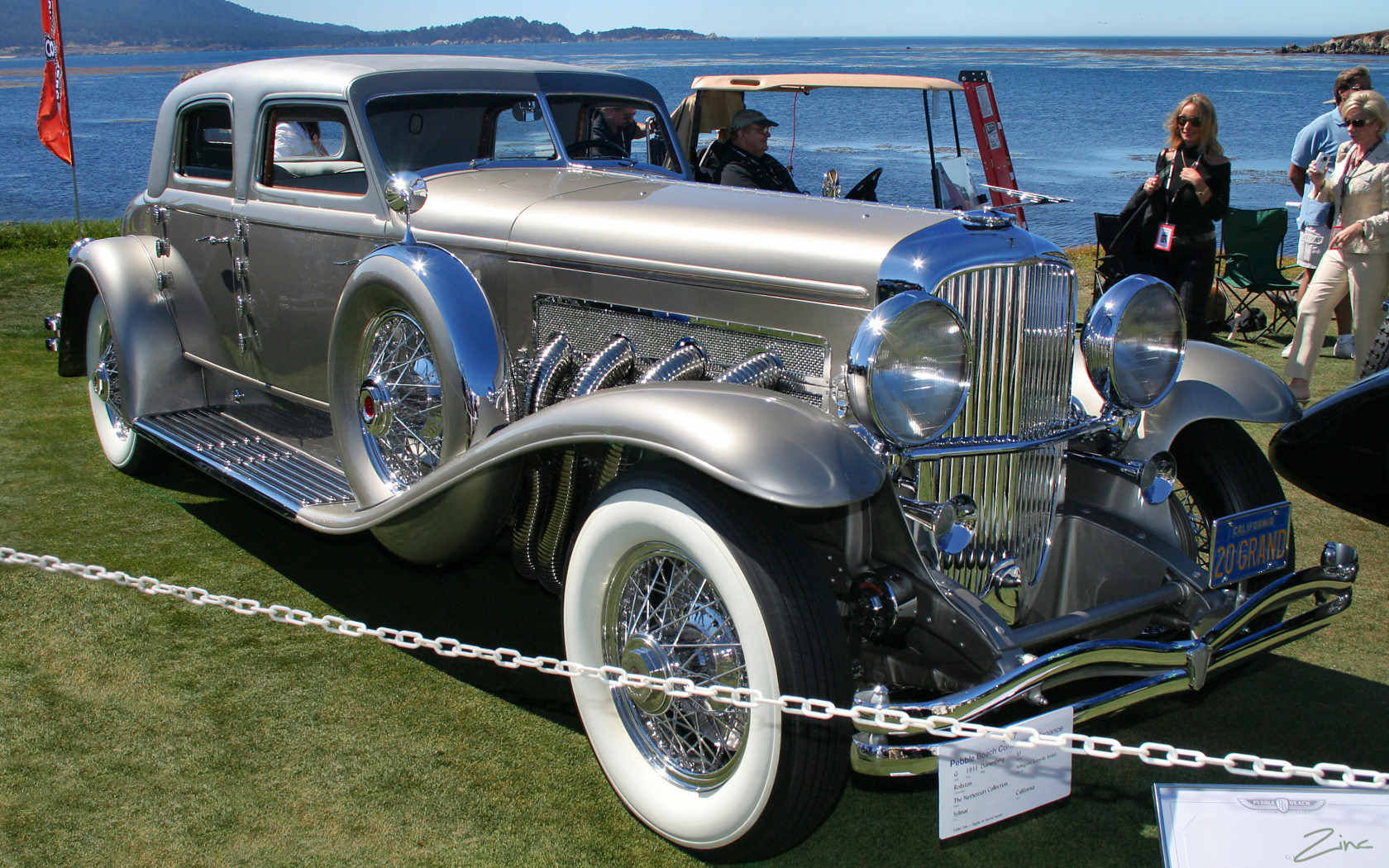

Overview
- Manufacturer: Duesenberg; Rollston
- Production: 1933
- Assembly: Indianapolis, Indiana; New York City (coach building)
- Designer: Gordon Buehrig

Body and chassis
- Class: Ultra-luxury car
- Body style: 4-door ultra-luxury sedan

Powertrain
- Engine: 6.9 L (420 cu in) DOHC Supercharged Duesenberg Straight-8 engine
- Power output: 320 hp (239 kW) at 4200 rpm

The Twenty Grand is a one-off 1933 Duesenberg Model SJ Arlington Torpedo Rollston sedan. Unveiled at the "Dream Car" exhibit at the 1933 Chicago World's Fair, the design's initial price tag of US$20,000 ($497,429 in 2025 dollars) during the height of the Great Depression gave it its nickname of Twenty Grand. It is widely considered as the most famous and beautiful Duesenberg ever built and its design, together with for instance the 1927–1933 Bugatti Royales, pioneered ultra-luxury cars. It is one of the most valuable cars in the world, and potentially the most valuable American car ever made, estimated to be worth US$50 million.

The Twenty Grand is the flagship and most valuable automobile in the Nethercutt Collection. It was purchased and fully restored by J.B. Nethercutt in 1979 and repainted in its iconic silver. It won Best of Show at the 1980 Pebble Beach Concours d'Elegance.

== History ==
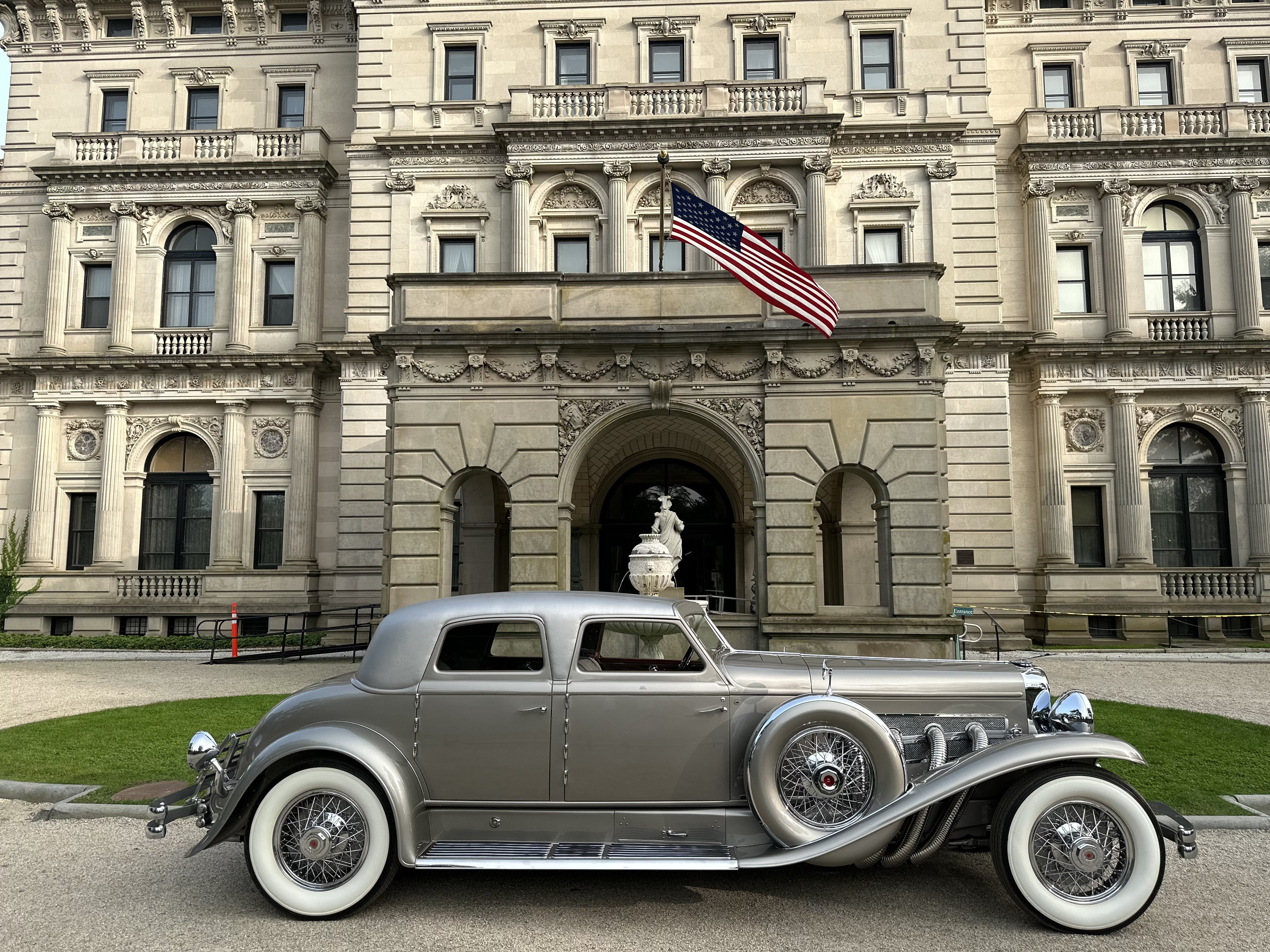
The Twenty Grand in front of The Breakers mansion in Newport, Rhode Island

Luxury brands Duesenberg and Rollston contracted leading American custom stylist Gordon Buehrig to design a one-off ultra-luxury car as the "Dream Car" representing the progress of the United States automotive industry at the 1933 Chicago World's Fair.

Once completed in Indianapolis, the finished automobile's set price was an astronomical $20,000 during the middle of the Great Depression, where cars typically cost around $600–800 ($19,897 in 2025 dollars) and houses $2,000 ($49,743 in 2025 dollars), leading onlookers to nickname the vehicle The Twenty Grand. It competed against the Pierce Silver Arrow and several other marque "Dream Cars", which the Twenty Grand was most remembered for its beautiful opulent ultra-luxury design as the only Model J of its kind, and more infamously its price. Ultimately because of its unprecedented price tag, it proved too expensive even for the wealthy American and foreign dignitaries attending the World's Fair.

Due to the further deterioration of the economy from the Great Depression, the Twenty Grand was untouched for a year before being sold for $20,000 to Shreve Archer during the 1934 run of the Fair, making it the second most expensive new Duesenberg ever sold. Later the Twenty Grand would have several other owners, who made such alterations as a modernized interior, fenders, and black and green paint.

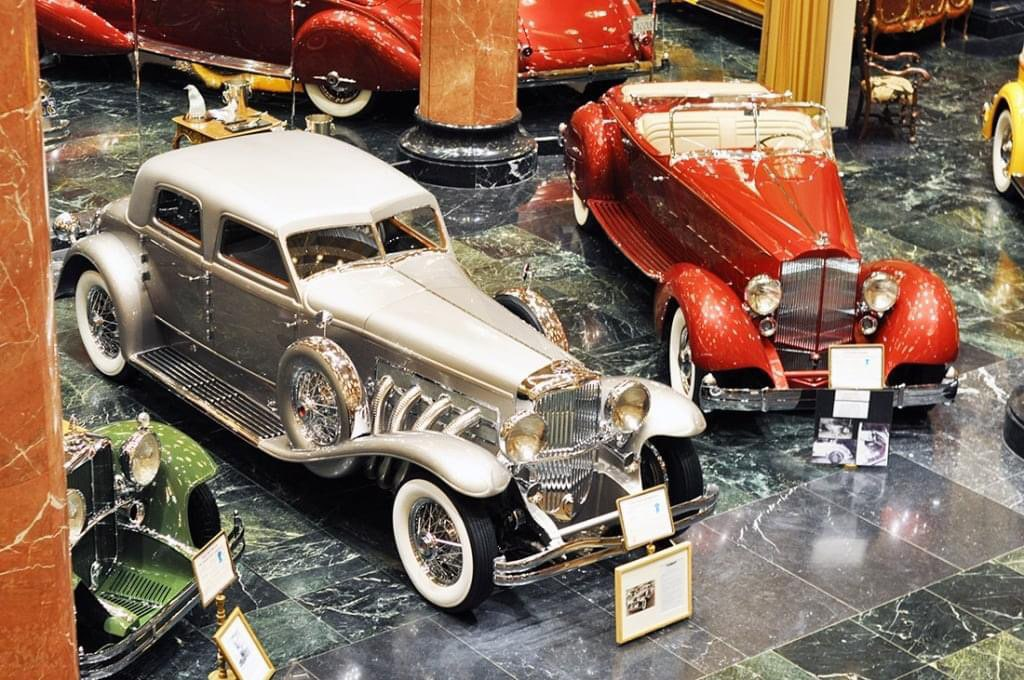
Twenty Grand at the Nethercutt Collection

In 1979, cosmetics entrepreneur J.B. Nethercutt purchased the car for $130,000 ($576,685 in 2025 dollars), making it one of the most expensive vehicle purchases up to that time. It was completely restored at the Nethercutt Collection, changing the exterior color from black to a metallic silver and reverting the interior to its original 1930s opulence. Once the restoration was complete, Nethercutt entered it into the Pebble Beach Concours d'Elegance in 1980, where it won Best of Show. In the late 1980s the Twenty Grand was selected to be exhibited in Essen, Germany, as one of “The Ten Most Beautiful Cars in the World.”

It won Best of Show at the 2011 Amelia Island Concours d'Elegance, and at the 2022 Las Vegas Concours d'Elegance. It returned to the Pebble Beach Concours as a non-competing showcase car In 2021 and 2026. In a 2023 episode of Jay Leno's Garage, Jay Leno described the Twenty Grand as the 20th-century equivalent of the Bugatti Veyron in regards to the unprecedented engine power and prominence of each of the vehicles relative to their times.

== See also ==
- Bugatti Type 51 Dubos
