= Nethercutt =

Nethercutt is a surname. Notable people with the surname include:

- George Nethercutt (1944–2024), American politician, author, consultant, columnist, and commentator
- Helen Nethercutt (born 1952), American businesswoman and autism activist
- J.B. Nethercutt (1913–2004), American entrepreneur and car collector
- Jack Nethercutt II (born 1936), American businessman and former professional racecar driver
