= Jack Nethercutt =

Jack Nethercutt may refer to:

- J.B. Nethercutt (1913–2004), founder of the Nethercutt Collection, a museum and car collection complex
- Jack Nethercutt II (born 1936), American businessman, restaurateur, and former racing driver
