= Bugatti Type 51 Dubos =

Bugatti Dubos
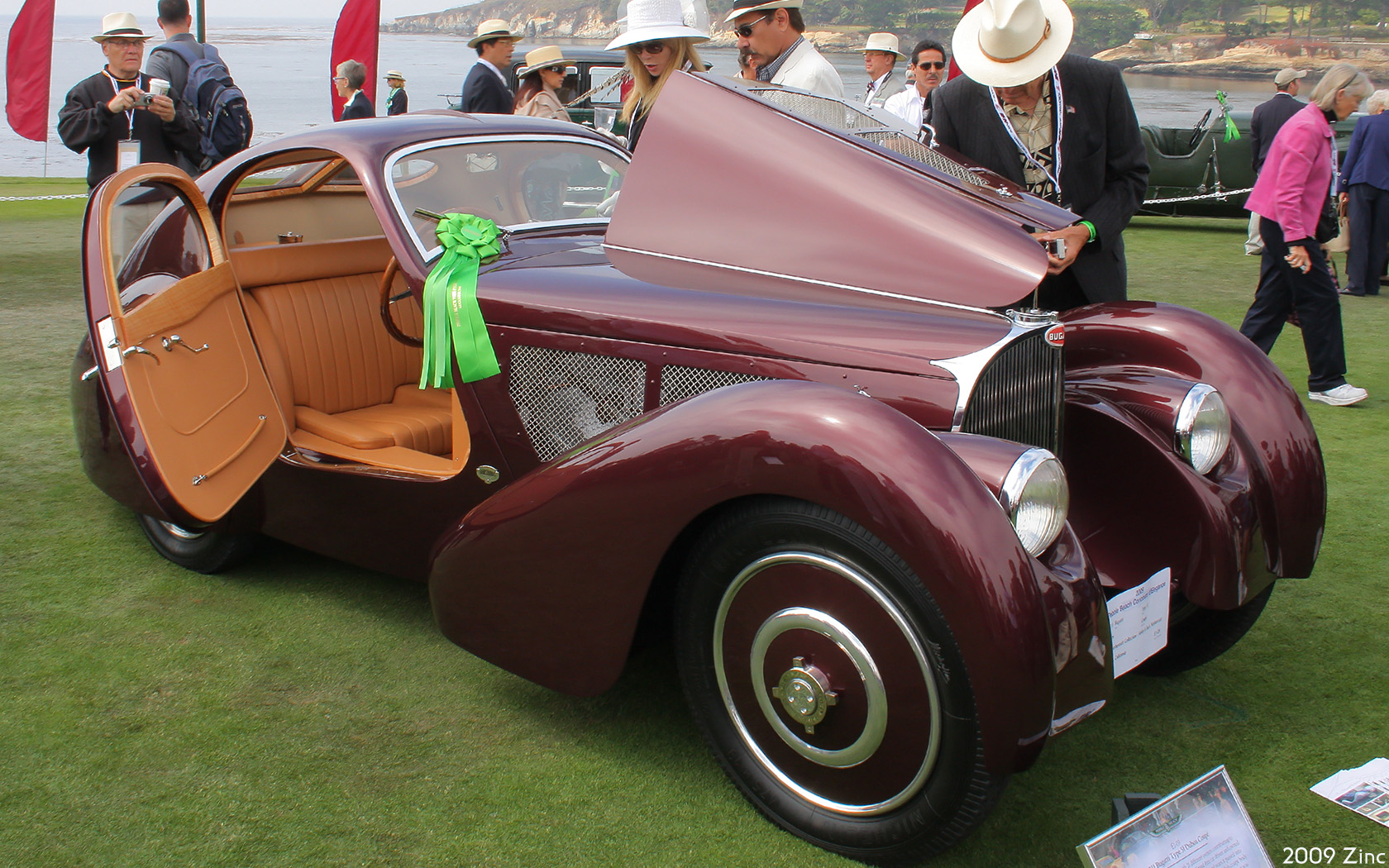
- The Type 51 Dubos Coupe at Pebble Beach

Overview
- Manufacturer: Bugatti (modified)
- Designer: Louis Dubos

Body and chassis
- Class: Sports car
- Body style: 2-door coupe

Powertrain
- Engine: 2.3 L (140 cu in) 16-valve DOHC supercharged straight-8
- Power output: 185 hp (138 kW)

The Bugatti Type 51 Dubos Coupe is a one-off custom automobile originally built by Bugatti in 1931 as an open-top Bugatti Type 51 race car that was driven by legendary racer Louis Chiron, winning the 1931 French Grand Prix with the vehicle. In 1937, it was modified by Louis Dubos to be a street-legal luxury road coupe. It had a price when new of $12,000 (165,000 francs), and is now one of the most valuable cars in the world, estimated at around $20 million as of 2023.

It is owned by the Nethercutt Collection, where J.B. Nethercutt purchased its original racing chassis in 1959 and later fully restored it back to the Bugatti Dubos in 2000.

== History ==
Bugatti chassis No. 51133 was completed in February 1931 as a Bugatti Type 51 race car which was one of only 40 constructed. Starting off as a Grand Prix race car, No. 51133 was driven by legendary Monégasque racer Louis Chiron and won the 1931 French Grand Prix with the vehicle.

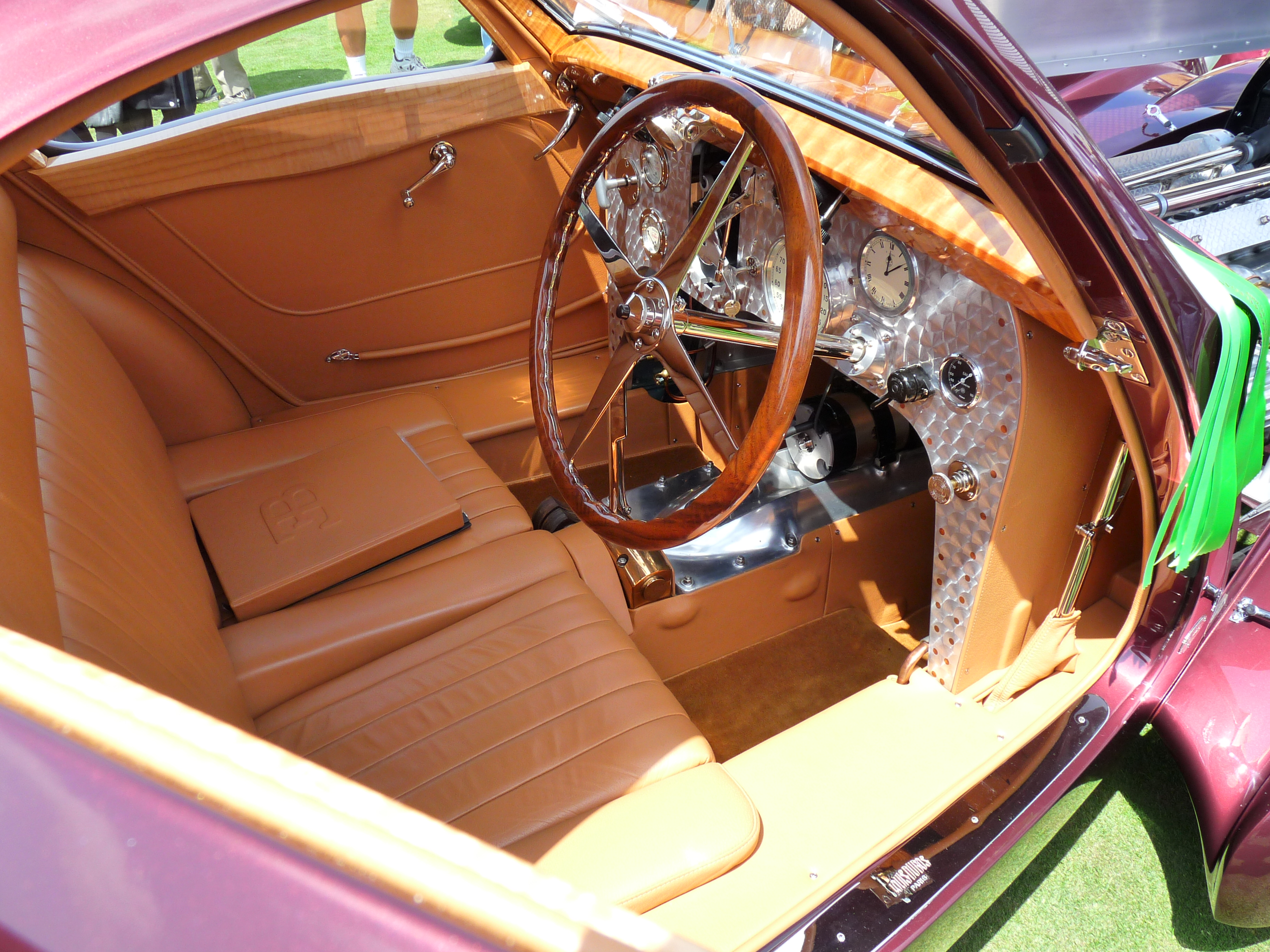
Interior of the Dubos

After its short but successful racing career the vehicle was sold to French Paris-based businessman Andre Bith, who converted it for legal road use by adding fenders and headlamps. In 1937 Pith contracted Louis Dubos to convert the race car's bodywork to become a luxury coupe. After bodywork was completed, No. 51133 became known as the Bugatti Type 51 Dubos Coupé and was entered into the several French concours d'Elegance competitions, including the 1937 Bagatelle Concours d'Elegance where it was awarded second overall. Pith eventually sold the Dubos, where and the one-off body and chassis were separated and was reverted to its original race car design.

In 1959, American cosmetics entrepreneur J.B. Nethercutt purchased the No. 51133 chassis where it was restored with its Chiron-era grand-prix body. The vehicle remained in the family's car collection on display at the Nethercutt Collection. In 2000 the formerly separated Dubos coupe chassis was for sale at an auction, which Nethercutt purchased and restored No. 51133 to the Dubos Coupe design with a dark purple paint. In 2009 the Dubos was restored again by his son, Jack Nethercutt II and it was repainted in the current deep metallic red.

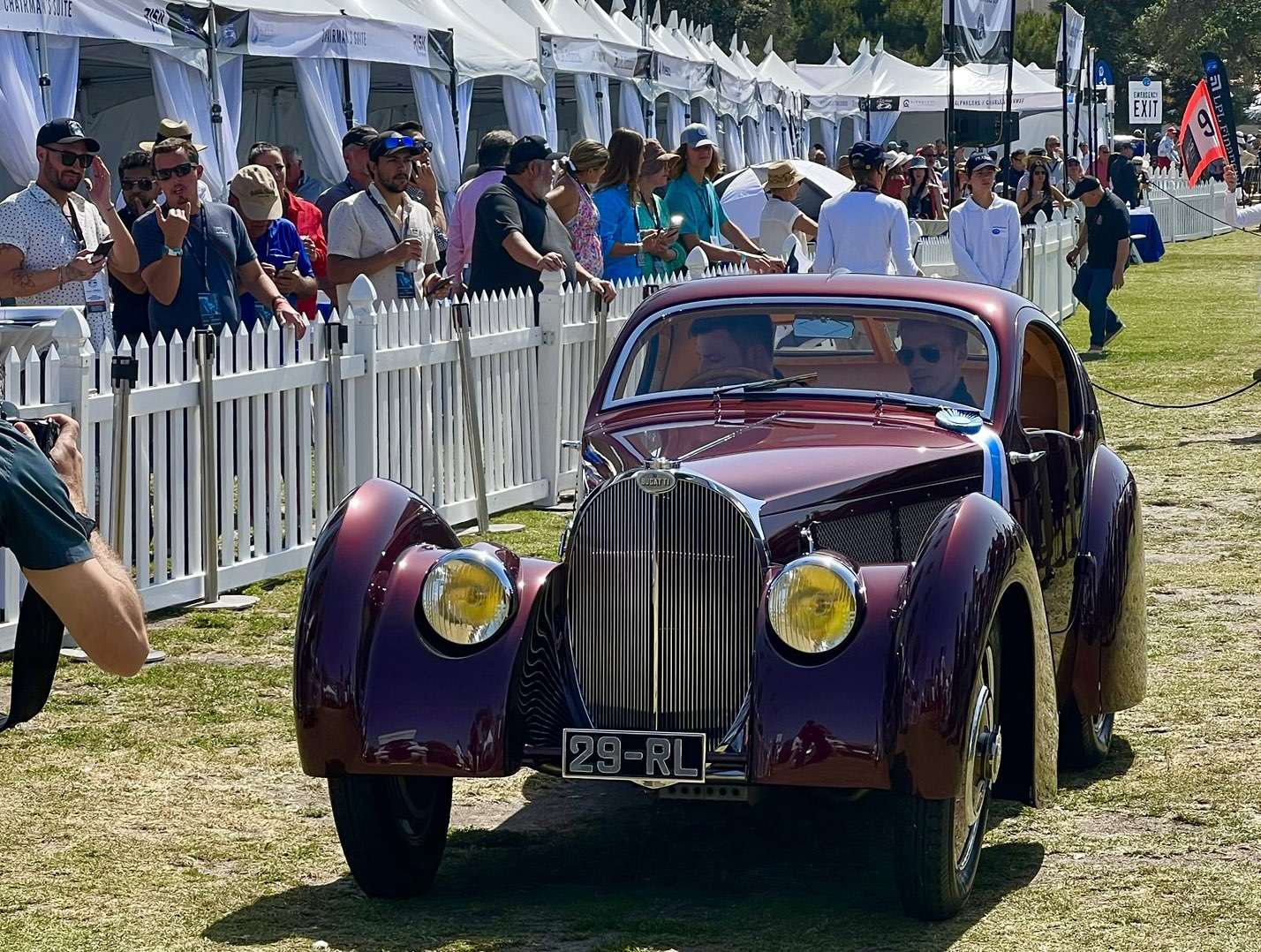
The Dubos at the La Jolla Concours d'Elegance in 2022

Under the Nethercutt Collection the Dubos won Best of Show at the prestigious Amelia Island Concours d'Elegance in 2005, Dana Point in 2011, Las Vegas in 2019, La Jolla in 2022, and Rodeo Drive in 2023.

== See also ==
- Duesenberg Twenty Grand
