= List of Pebble Beach Concours d'Elegance Best of Show winners =

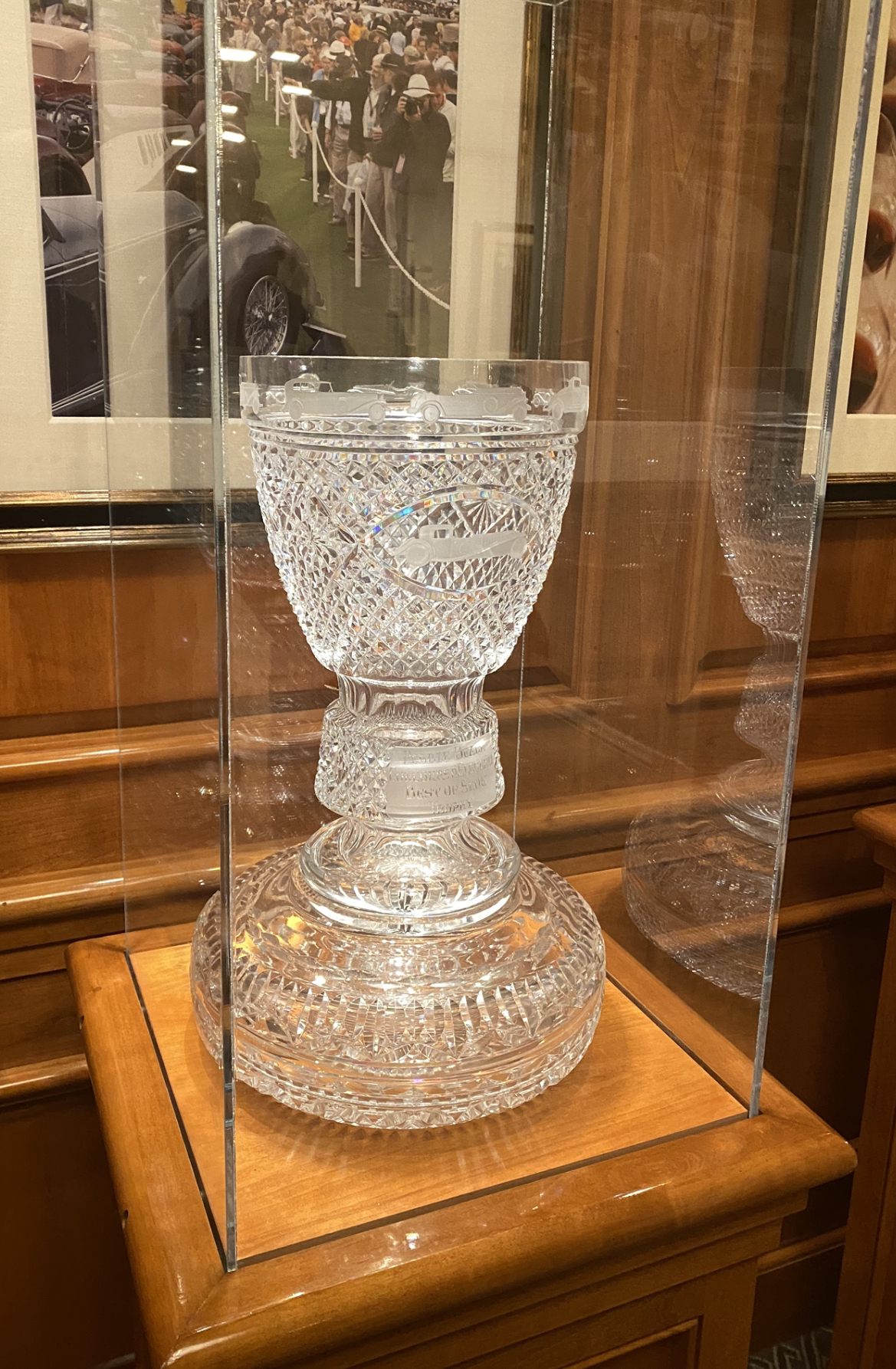
Pebble Beach Best of Show trophy replica in 2023

The Pebble Beach Concours d'Elegance is held annually in Monterey, California. Of the various awards given at the car show, the finale and most significant is the Best of Show. It is considered the most prestigious award achievable for a car collector or restorer worldwide. The winner is presented with an engraved trophy and engraved Rolex watch, which in 2023 was a Rolex Oyster Perpetual DateJust 41.

J.B. Nethercutt holds the most Best of Show awards with 6 wins. Bugatti and Mercedes-Benz are tied as the most successful marque with 10 wins each. Since the beginning of the competition, only 7 post-war cars have won Best of Show; only 1 of which after the 1968 competition (2014).

== Best of Show winners ==
Award year	Vehicle year	Make	Model	Chassis number	Owner
1950	1950	Edwards	R-26 Special Sport Roadster	W3361-8 C	Sterling Edwards
1951	1951	Jaguar	Mark VII Saloon		Mrs. Charles H. Hornberg, Jr.
1952	1952	Jaguar	XK120 Fixed Head Coupe		Glen Sorey
1953	1953	Austin-Healey	100 Roadster		Peter Clowes
1954	1952	Jaguar	XK120 Fixed Head Coupe		Barclay Cotter
1955	1931	Pierce-Arrow	41 LeBaron Town Car Cabriolet		Phil Hill
1956	1930	Bugatti	Type 37 Grand Prix	37193	Dr. Milton R. Roth
1957	1937	Rolls-Royce	Phantom III Mulliner Sedanca de Ville	3BT-179	Frank B. Cox
1958	1930	duPont	Model G Merrimac Town Car		J.B. Nethercutt
1959	1939	Bugatti	Type 57C Gangloff Atalante Coupe	57775	J.B. Nethercutt
1960	None				
1961	1930	Packard	740 Custom Eight Roadster	181252	Scott Newhall
1962	1913	Rolls-Royce	Silver Ghost London to Edinburgh Tourer	2484	Alton H. Walker
1963	1931	Pierce-Arrow	41 LeBaron Sports Sedan		William Harrah
1964	1932	Bugatti	Type 50 Coupe Profile	46546	William Harrah
1965	1927	Bentley	4½ Litre Vanden Plas Tourer	ST3009	Christopher F. Coburn
1966	1931	Bugatti	Type 41 Royale Binder Coupe de Ville	41111	William Harrah
1967	1937	Rolls-Royce	Phantom III Mulliner Sports Saloon	3CM65	Ralph C. Shermund
1968	1964	Maserati	Mistral Coupe	AM109-116	Stanley W. Good, Jr
1969	1934	Duesenberg	J Murphy Dual Cowl Phaeton	2564	J.B. Nethercutt
1970	1931	Daimler	Double-Six 50 Royal Limousine		J.B. Nethercutt
1971	1927	Mercedes-Benz	680S Gangloff Open Tourer		Owen Owens
1972	1922	Hispano-Suiza	H6B Labourdette Torpedo	10317	Mr. & Mrs. Jules M. Heumann
1973	1939	Mercedes-Benz	540K Special Cabriolet A	408371	Mrs. Otis Chandler
1974	1929	Rolls-Royce	Phantom I Brewster Regent Convertible Coupe	S377LR	M. L. Post
1975	1934	Packard	1101 Eight Convertible Victoria	727-42	Robert Milhous
1976	1937	Bugatti	Type 57SC Atalante Coupe	57551	William Harrah
1977	1927	Packard	343 Eight Murphy Convertible Sedan	223084	Mr. & Mrs. Phil Hill
1978	1929	Duesenberg	J LeBaron Sweep Panel Dual Cowl Phaeton	2252	Peter Rosi
1979	1931	Chrysler	CG Imperial LeBaron Dual Cowl Phaeton	7801711	Mr. & Mrs. Gerry Jensen
1980	1933	Duesenberg	SJ Rollston Arlington Torpedo Sedan	2539	J.B. Nethercutt
1981	1929	Duesenberg	J Murphy Convertible Coupe	2239	Terry Radey
1982	1935	Mercedes-Benz	500K Special Roadster	123702	Tom & Gerd Perkins
1983	1930	Isotta Fraschini	Tipo 8A SS Castagna Dual Cowl Tourer	1659	Irwin Ginsberg
1984	1929	Cunningham	Series V-7 Town Car Landaulet	V5423	Mr. & Mrs. Kenneth Vaughn
1985	1939	Bugatti	Type 57 Saoutchik Cabriolet	57735	Jack Becronis
1986	1936	Mercedes-Benz	500K Special Roadster		Arturo Keller
1987	1928	Minerva	AF Hibbard & Darrin Ostruk Berline Transformable	56579	Thomas Lester
1988	1937	Alfa Romeo	8C 2900B Corto Touring Spider	412014	John Mozart
1989	1922	Hispano-Suiza	H6B Labourdette Skiff		Robert L. Meyer
1990	1938	Bugatti	Type 57SC Atlantic	57591	Ralph Lauren
1991	1932	Chrysler	CH Imperial Custom Speedster	7900470	Sam & Emily Mann
1992	1929	Rolls-Royce	Phantom II Brewster Town Car	69WJ	J.B. Nethercutt
1993	1930	Mercedes-Benz	710SSK Count Trossi Sports Roadster	36038	Ralph Lauren
1994	1933	Duesenberg	J Rollston Torpedo Convertible Victoria	2262	Terence & Mary Beth Adderley
1995	1931	Isotta Fraschini	Tipo 8B Dansk Viggo Jensen Cabriolet de Ville	1720	William Haines
1996	1938	Delage	D8-120 deVillars Speedster	51626	Sam & Emily Mann
1997	1937	Talbot-Lago	T150C Figoni & Falaschi Coupe	90104	William E. Connor II
1998	1938	Bugatti	Type 57SC Corsica Roadster	57593	John Mozart
1999	1932	Daimler	Double-Six 40/50 Martin Walter Sports Saloon	32382	George Lingenbrink & Charles Bronson
2000	1937	Delahaye	135 M Figoni & Falaschi Cabriolet	48666	Jacques & Betty Harguindeguy
2001	1930	Mercedes-Benz	700SS Erdmann & Rossi Roadster	36348	Arturo & Deborah Keller
2002	1934	Voisin	C-15 Saliot Roadster	N/A	Sam & Emily Mann
2003	1936	Bugatti	Type 57SC Atlantic	57374	Peter D. Williamson
2004	1938	Horch	853A Erdmann & Rossi Sport Cabriolet	854275	Joseph and Margie Cassini III
2005	1937	Delage	D8-120 S Pourtout Aero Coupe	51620	Sam & Emily Mann
2006	1931	Daimler	Double-Six 50 Corsica Drophead Coupe	30661	Robert M. Lee
2007	1935	Duesenberg	SJ Mormon Meteor Special Speedster		Harry Yeaggy
2008	1938	Alfa Romeo	8C 2900B Touring Berlinetta	412035	Jon & Mary Shirley
2009	1937	Horch	853 Voll & Ruhrbeck Sports Cabriolet	853558	Robert M. Lee
2010	1933	Delage	D8 S deVillars Roadster	38012	Jim Patterson; Patterson Collection
2011	1934	Voisin	C-25 Aerodyne	50010	Peter & Merle Mullin
2012	1928	Mercedes-Benz	680S Saoutchik Torpedo	35949	Paul & Judy Andrews
2013	1934	Packard	1108 Twelve Dietrich Convertible Victoria	902327	Joseph and Margie Cassini III
2014	1954	Ferrari	375 MM Scaglietti Coupe	0402AM	Jon Shirley
2015	1924	Isotta Fraschini	Tipo 8A Worblaufen Cabriolet	605	Jim Patterson; Patterson Collection
2016	1936	Lancia	Astura Pinin Farina Cabriolet	33-3277	Richard Mattei
2017	1929	Mercedes-Benz	680S Barker Tourer	35956	Bruce McCaw
2018	1937	Alfa Romeo	8C 2900B Touring Berlinetta	412020	David & Ginny Sydorick
2019	1931	Bentley	8 Litre Gurney Nutting Sports Tourer	YF5011	Michael Kadoorie
2020	None				
2021	1938	Mercedes-Benz	540K Autobahn Kurier	408336	Arturo & Deborah Keller
2022	1932	Duesenberg	Model J Figoni Sports Torpedo	2509	Lee R. Anderson Sr.
2023	1937	Mercedes-Benz	540K Special Roadster	154075	Jim Patterson; Patterson Collection
2024	1934	Bugatti	Type 59 Sports	57248	Fritz Burkard; Pearl Collection
2025	1924	Hispano-Suiza	H6C Nieuport-Astra Torpedo "Tulipwood Torpedo"	11012	Penny and Lee R. Anderson Sr.
2026	1935	Duesenberg	SSJ LaGrande Speedster	2595	Harry Yeaggy

== Multiple wins ==
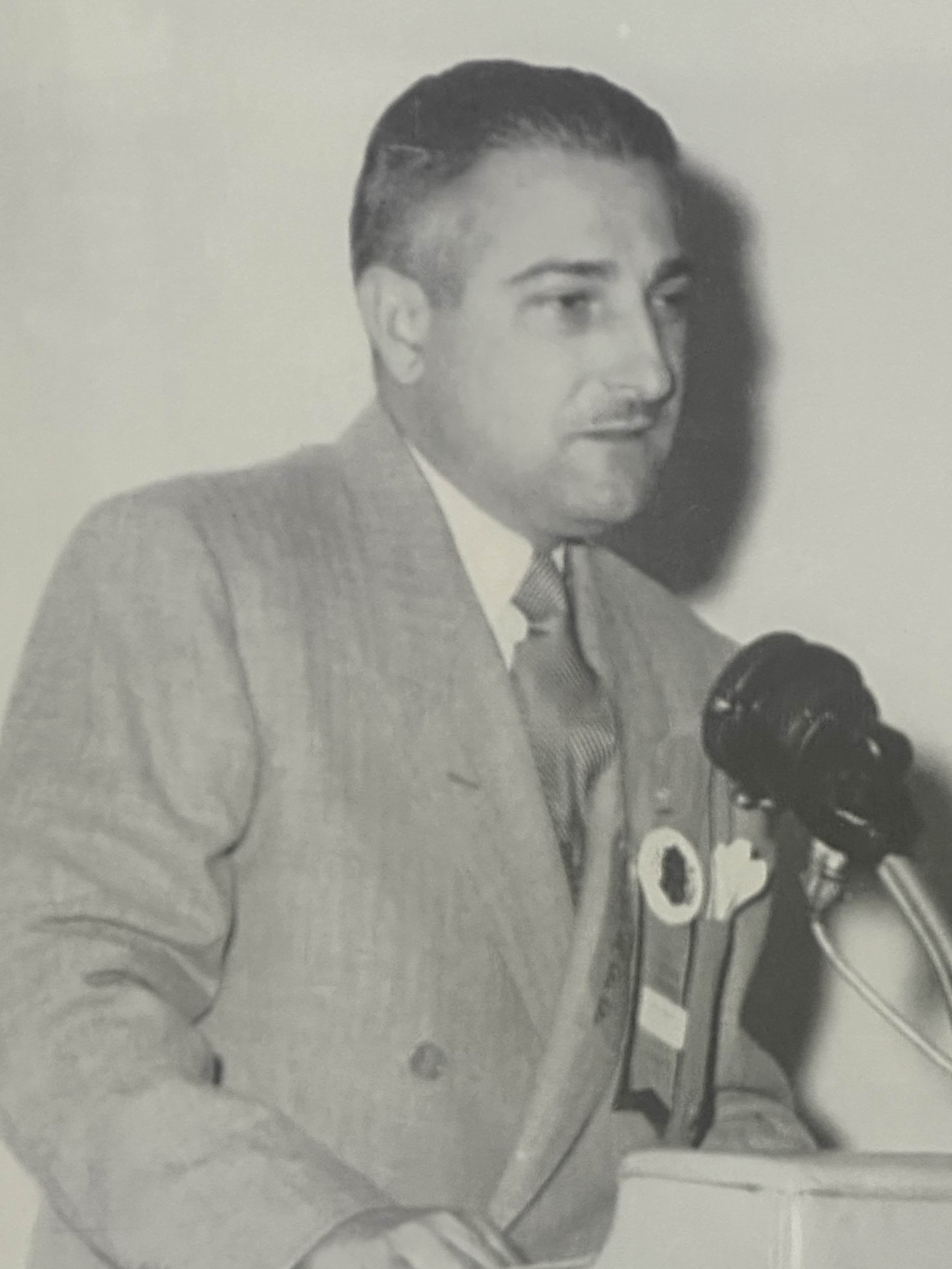
J.B. Nethercutt has won Best of Show a record six times with the Nethercutt Collection.

=== Individual ===
Competitor	Wins	Award Years
J.B. Nethercutt	6	1958, 1959, 1969, 1970, 1980, 1992
William Harrah	4	1963, 1964, 1966, 1976
Sam Mann	4	1991, 1996, 2002, 2005
Arturo Keller	3	1986, 2001, 2021
Jim Patterson	3	2010, 2015, 2023
Phil Hill	2	1955, 1977
John Mozart	2	1988, 1998
Ralph Lauren	2	1990, 1993
Joseph Cassini III	2	2004, 2013
Robert M. Lee	2	2006, 2009
Harry Yeaggy	2	2007, 2026
Jon Shirley	2	2008, 2014
Lee R. Anderson Sr.	2	2022, 2025

== Winning marque ==
Maker	Nat.	Wins	Best of Show Vehicle
Mercedes-Benz	(Germany)	10	1971, 1973, 1982, 1986, 1993, 2001, 2012, 2017, 2021, 2023
Bugatti	(France)	10	1956, 1959, 1964, 1966, 1976, 1985, 1990, 1998, 2003, 2024
Duesenberg	(United States)	8	1969, 1978, 1980, 1981, 1994, 2007, 2022, 2026
Rolls-Royce	(United Kingdom)	5	1957, 1962, 1967, 1974, 1992
Packard	(United States)	4	1961, 1975, 1977, 2013
Hispano-Suiza	(Spain)	3	1972, 1989, 2025
Jaguar	(United Kingdom)	3	1951, 1952, 1954
Daimler	(United Kingdom)	3	1970, 1999, 2006
Isotta Fraschini	(Italy)	3	1983, 1995, 2015
Alfa Romeo	(Italy)	3	1988, 2008, 2018
Delage	(France)	3	1996, 2005, 2010
Chrysler	(United States)	2	1979, 1991
Horch	(Germany)	2	2004, 2009
Pierce-Arrow	(United States)	2	1955, 1963
Voisin	(France)	2	2002, 2011
Austin Healey	(United Kingdom)	1	1953
Cunningham	(United States)	1	1984
Delahaye	(France)	1	2000
Du Pont	(United States)	1	1958
Edwards*	(United States)	1	1950
Ferrari	(Italy)	1	2014
Lancia	(Italy)	1	2016
Maserati	(Italy)	1	1968
Minerva	(Belgium)	1	1987
Talbot-Lago	(France)	1	1997

* Custom car

== See also ==
- List of motor vehicle awards
