= Anunay Sood =

Indian travel influencer and photographer (1994–2025)

- Sood at Las Vegas Concours d'Elegance 2025
- Born: 6 February 1993; Delhi, India
- Died: 4 November 2025 (aged 32); Las Vegas, Nevada, U.S.
- Education: Amity University, Noida
- Occupations: Travel influencer, photographer, videographer
- Years active: 2010–2025
- Known for: Cinematic travel vlogs; Forbes India Top 100 Digital Stars (2022–2024)

Anunay Sood (6 February 1993 – 4 November 2025) was an Indian travel blogger, photographer and videographer based in Dubai, United Arab Emirates. He produced travel content across 46 countries and appeared on the Forbes India Top 100 Digital Stars list for three consecutive years (2022–2024).

== Early life ==
Sood completed his Delhi Public School, Noida. Sood initially worked in the corporate sector.

== Career ==
Sood built a following through travel photography and vlogs on Instagram. Relocating to Dubai expanded his global reach. His work featured in National Geographic India, Condé Nast Traveller India, and Lonely Planet India.

He served as an OPPO brand ambassador and won Exhibit and Cosmopolitan Travel Influencer of the Year (2021–2022).

Sood was also co-founder of Meta Social FZ LLC.

== Bigg Boss ==
Sood appeared as a guest on Bigg Boss OTT 2 in August 2023, entering the house for tasks and engaging with contestants.

He was the first YouTuber to vlog inside the Bigg Boss house and supported winner Elvish Yadav during the finale, sharing behind-the-scenes content post-show.

== Personal life ==
At the time of his death, Sood was in a relationship with influencer Shivani Parihar.

=== Death ===
Sood died on 4 November 2025, at the age of 32, while attending the Concours d'Elegance car show at the Wynn Hotel in Las Vegas. The Las Vegas Metropolitan Police Department stated the incident as non-criminal; no cause of death was publicly disclosed.

As reported by 8NewsNow, a woman staying with Sood told investigators that she, Sood, and another woman purchased what they believed to be cocaine from a man on the casino floor at around 4 a.m. She stated that the three consumed the substance before going to sleep, and when the two women awoke later, Sood was found unresponsive. Police reportedly recovered a small bag containing an unidentified white substance and additional evidence suggesting the powder had been snorted. As of 19 November 2025, authorities have not made any arrests in connection with the incident.

In an earlier statement to HT.com, the Las Vegas Metropolitan Police Department said: “On November 4, 2025, LVMPD responded to a dead body located in the 3100 block of South Las Vegas Boulevard. Officers assisted the coroner and took a non-criminal/medical report.”

Over a month later, the findings of the official coroner's report concluded that the cause of death was the combined effect of fentanyl and ethanol toxicity.

==== Repatriation and funeral ====
Sood's body was repatriated to India from Las Vegas, United States, and brought to his residence in Noida on the evening of 10 November 2025. Friends, followers and well-wishers gathered to pay their last respects. The funeral was held the following day, 11 November 2025, at the Sector 94 cremation ground in Noida.
