= Helene Rother =

American female industrial designer

- Born: 1908; Leipzig, Germany
- Died: 1999 (aged 90–91); Michigan, U.S.
- Awards: Inducted to the Automotive Hall of Fame (2020)

Helene Rother (1908–1999) was the first woman to work as an automotive designer when she joined the interior styling staff of General Motors in Detroit in 1943. She specialized in designs for automotive interiors, as well as furniture, jewelry, fashion accessories, and stained glass windows. In the early 1940s, Rother was also active as a comic artist.

She was posthumously inducted into the Automotive Hall of Fame in 2020.

== Early life ==
A native of Leipzig, Germany, Rother studied art at the Kunstgewerbeschule (a school of applied arts) in Hamburg. It is also claimed that she studied at the Bauhaus, although the details of when this occurred remain unclear. No dates are available, and some sources say she went to the Weimar Bauhaus (open 1919-1925), while others claim she went to Dessau (open 1926-1932).

Rother later moved to Paris, where she designed both high fashion jewelry and popular miniature animal pins worn by women on hats and dresses before World War II.

In 1932, Rother gave birth to her daughter, Ina Ann Rother, whose father would later be active in the French Resistance and on the run for years.

Rother fled from Nazi-occupied France, together with her seven-year-old daughter Ina, to a refugee camp in Morocco, where they stayed for four months before finding passage to the U.S. on a ship and arriving in New York City on 11 August 1941.

== Career ==
Rother's first employment in New York was as an illustrator for Marvel Comics. In 1943, she moved to Detroit, Michigan, to work for General Motors. She joined the interior styling staff and was responsible for upholstery colors and fabrics, lighting, door hardware, and seat construction.

Although she was Detroit's first female automotive designer, it was downplayed at the time, and her salary, as reported in a newspaper, was US$600 a month. At this time, the average wage was $200 for a man. "She was one of the few women to succeed in a man's job during an era when the vast majority of women couldn't even see a glass ceiling-it was hidden behind steel doors."

In 1947, Rother established her design studio on the 16th floor of the landmark Fisher Building, specializing in designs for automotive interiors, furniture, and stained glass windows. Her business was named Helene Rother Associates. In 1948 she published a technical paper with the Society of Automotive Engineers (SAE) asking "Are we doing a good job in our car interiors" She participated in SAE conferences describing that much can be and should be done in improving automobile interior design and the materials used at that time, summarizing what determines quality in textiles "You get exactly what you pay for." Her presentation at the annual conference also marked the first time that a woman addressed the SAE.

In 1949, The SAE Journal reported on Rother's work and her activities advocating for women in the industry. They described her "efforts have encompassed items ranging from jewelry and accessories to several of today's automobiles, and quoted her that "even the Army is ahead of industry in employing the talents of women."

== Nash Motors ==
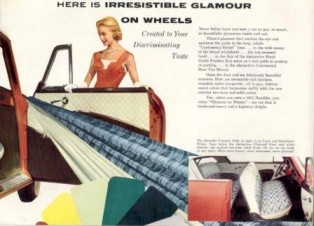
1955 brochure copy for Rambler American "Created to Your Discriminating Taste" by Helene Rother

Rother was soon contracted by Nash Motors and styled the interiors of most of their cars from 1948 to 1956. Even the economical Nash Rambler models were prominently promoted as "irresistible glamour" on wheels. The 100 inches (2,540 millimetres) wheelbase Rambler was conceived initially as a well-appointed convertible with its interior designed with the aid of Rother as a consultant. Nash used a strategy to give the new Rambler a positive public image by avoiding it being seen by the public as a "cheap little car." It was "well-equipped and stylish" with no "stripped-down" versions. The focus on design and quality features helped establish a new segment in the automobile market, as the Rambler is widely acknowledged to be the first successful modern American compact car.

Rother designed the Rambler's interiors to appeal to women's tastes because she knew what women looked for in a car. Her designs featured elegant, stylish, and expensive fabrics coordinated in colors and trim. The new 1951 Rambler models were also "given the custom touch" with fabrics and colors selected by Rother that "equaled the best of interiors in American luxury cars of the period."

She toured the 1951 Paris Auto Salon and was the first woman to address the Society of Automotive Engineers in Detroit. In 1953, Nash was awarded the Jackson Medal, "...since 1898, one of America's most sought-after awards," according to an advertisement, for the excellence of design. Many Nash sales brochures and Rambler advertisements of the time featured the copy stating: "Styling by Pinin Farina and interiors by Madame Helene Rother of Paris" as proof of the European influence on company's automobile styling. She conferred with Pinin Farina, who styled the exterior of the 1953 Nash Airflytes, to coordinate with the interiors and new custom fabrics. In 1954, the Nash Ambassadors had a significant feature: the completely new interior by Rother. That year, Nash merged with Hudson to create American Motors Corporation (AMC), but her influence on interior fashion in automobiles continued.

Rother enjoyed driving, received speeding tickets, and was involved in accidents. While at Nash, she "bought a Nash car to match her new role—and promptly totaled it".

== Other work ==
Rother purchased a home on Chicago Boulevard in Detroit, with living quarters upstairs and a studio downstairs, where she continued other independent consulting work. Her clients included tire companies Goodyear, B.F. Goodrich, and U.S. Rubber, along with clients such as Stromberg-Carlson and International Harvester. She was also responsible for designing the interiors of ambulances and hearses for Miller-Meteor.

A sterling flatware pattern called "Skylark" was designed by Rother for Samuel Kirk & Son, a silver craftsmen firm since 1815, which the company issued from 1954 into the late 1980s. The Skylark brand and logo expired in 1997.

Rother decided she wanted to begin producing art again, so she visited Europe in the 1960s and enrolled in courses to learn the techniques of stained glass. She saw the struggle to restore or rebuild war-damaged churches and cathedrals. She also designed stained glass for churches in the U.S. and had installations in the mid-1960s, mainly in Michigan. Examples include the Beverly Hills United Methodist Church in Beverly Hills, and the St. Lazarus Serbian Orthodox Cathedral in northeast Detroit with all thick "chunk" faceted glass, that was fabricated in France. In 1962, the St. James United Church of Christ in Dearborn, was dedicated featuring windows and the reredos designed by Rother. She also designed stained glass windows for a modern cathedral, Our Lady Queen of Peace, in Harper Woods, Michigan. She used 1-inch (25 mm) thick pieces of glass, which consisted of twelve elongated triangular frames that merged at the top of the circle. The glass was selected and fabricated into small pieces by a family group of craftsmen in Buche, a suburb of Paris, before being shipped to the U.S. for final assembly during the construction.

Rother remains relatively unknown in the world of stained glass as women who designed stained glass, either independently or under a major studio name, were mostly unrecognized at the time.

In her later years, Rother also spent time on her horse farm near Metamora, Michigan. She earned awards for thoroughbred horse training between 1982 and 1990.

== Legacy ==
In 1953, Tide, a magazine covering the sales and advertising industry and trends, wrote: "A most attractive woman, whom I have thus encountered along the periphery of advertising, is Madam Helene Rother — pretty and vivacious enough to serve as a prototype of Parisian women. She is an industrial designer with an impressive record."

According to automotive historian Patrick Foster, Rother is one of the important people in the automotive industry who have been overlooked or forgotten. She was not the first woman to work in styling; however, "she was an early pioneer and one of the best."

Rother has been identified as the "patron saint" of the Las Vegas Concours d'Elegance, and a bust inspired the design of the award trophies.

In 2020, her contributions were recognized by the Automotive Hall of Fame for "her influence on the styling and design of vehicle interiors."
