= Harry Yeaggy =

American banker and car collector (born 1946)

Harry Yeaggy (born 1946) is an American banker and car collector. He and Louis Beck co-own the Cincinnati-based Union Savings Bank and Guardian Savings Bank, a subsidiary of U.S. Bancorp; the pair became business partners in the 1980s. In 2008 Yeaggy was a director of Janus Hotels & Resorts following their merger with Beck Hospitality. Yeaggy has held a major stake in Beck Hospitality, and served as chief operating officer.

His car collection is displayed at a private museum in Ohio. Yeaggy has 25 cars in his collection and sells a car before he acquires a new one. His family could not afford a car when he was a child. He started to collect cars after acquiring a 1937 Packard and restoring it; he then bought Dusenbergs. His garage was profiled by Phil Berg in Autoweek magazine in April 2008. In 2022 Yeaggy lost a legal case against the Ohio Board of Tax Appeals regarding sales tax and was ordered to pay $950,000 in use tax, plus penalties and interest.

Notable automobiles owned by Yeaggy have included:

- The Mormon Meteor which won Best of Show at the 2023 Las Vegas Concours d'Elegance
- The Aston Martin DB5 that was driven by Sean Connery in Goldfinger and Thunderball, which he bought in 2010 at RM Auctions in London for £2.6 million.
- A 1956 Cadillac parade car used by the American presidents Dwight D. Eisenhower, John F. Kennedy and Lyndon B. Johnson and believed to have been travelling directly behind Kennedy's car during his assassination; he bought this in 2006 at auction for $400,000.
- A 1962 "bubbletop" Lincoln that Kennedy used when president.
- The 1956 Chevrolet Corvette C1 SR that came ninth at the 1956 12 Hours of Sebring, which he sold around 2011.
- The No. 1076 Ford GT40
- The 001 chassis Chevrolet Corvette Grand Sport with a 427 "big block" engine, which he bought in 2002 for $4.2 million.
- A Ferrari F40, F50 and Ferrari Enzo.
- A 1967 Ferrari 412 P which was once displayed at the Cincinnati Art Museum.
- A 1929 Duesenberg J/SJ Convertible that won the Best in Show Concours d'Elegance Trophy at the 23rd Amelia Island Concours d'Elegance in 2018.
