= Las Vegas Concours d'Elegance =

Automotive elegance contest and car show in Las Vegas, Nevada, US

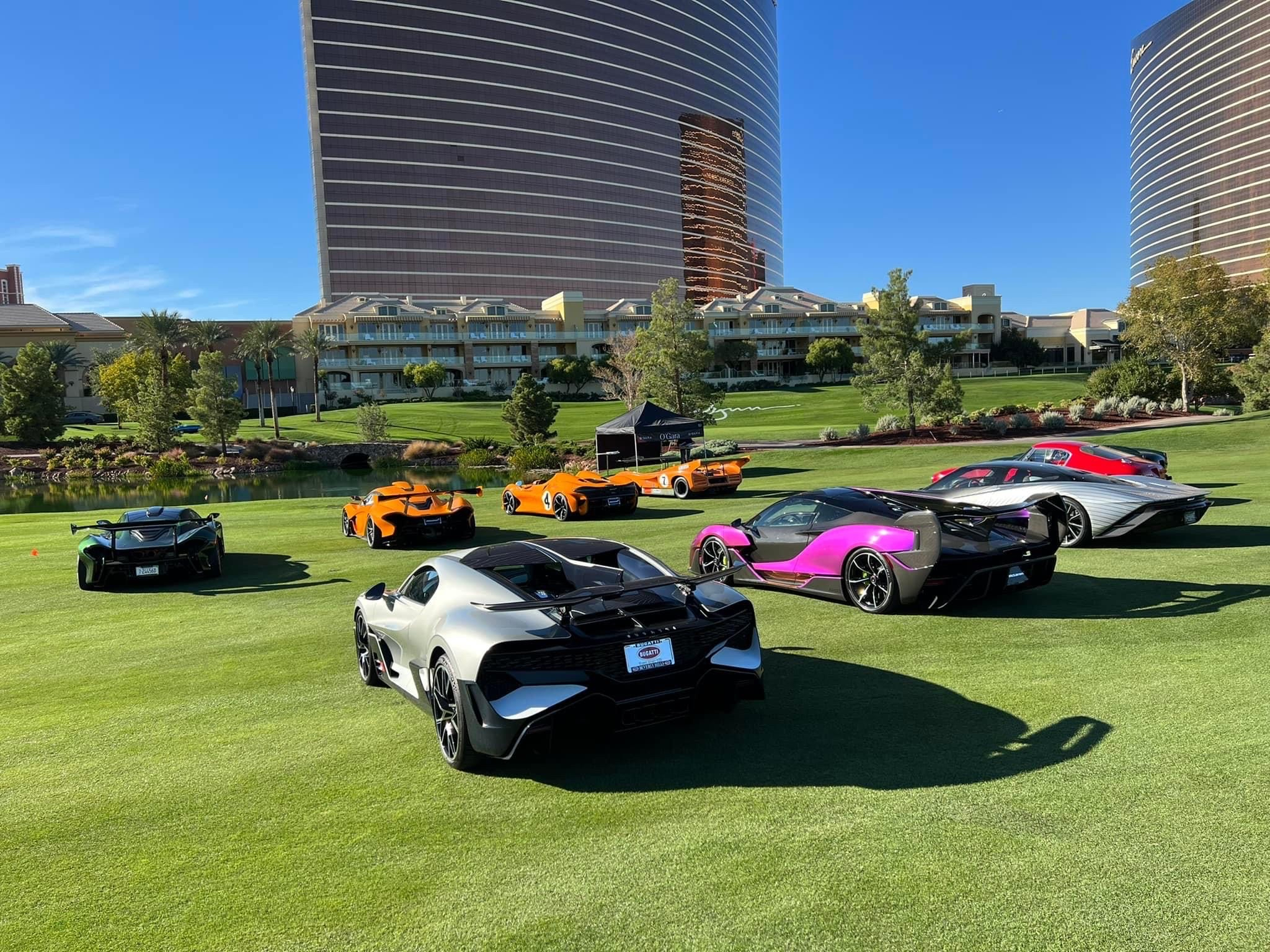
2022 event at the Wynn Golf & Country Club

The Las Vegas Concours d'Elegance (officially known as the Concours at Wynn Las Vegas) is an automotive Concours d'Elegance event and car show held annually at the Wynn in Las Vegas, Nevada.

== History ==
The inaugural Las Vegas Concours d'Elegance was held on Saturday October 26, 2019 at the DragonRidge Country Club in MacDonald Highlands. The 2020 event was cancelled due to the COVID-19 pandemic. The 2021 event was hosted at the Las Vegas Ballpark in Summerlin.

Starting in 2022, the event has been hosted as a weekend-long event the Wynn Las Vegas and was renamed the Concours at Wynn Las Vegas. The 2022 event featured over 250 cars, and the Duesenberg Twenty Grand won pre-war Best of Show. The event's Grand Marshal was Jay Leno, and the 35th anniversary of the Ferrari F40 was celebrated at the event.. The 2023 event was hosted on November 11 to 12, 2023 to take place as the beginning of the Race Week for the Formula One Las Vegas Grand Prix race. The event emcee was British racecar driver Justin Bell. The event began the Sunset GT experience the night before the concours with the Wynn rooftop full of supercars.

In 2025, the event was further expanded and started a multi-year sponsorship deal with watchmaker Richard Mille. The event hosted the largest ever assembly of Bugattis with 60 to celebrate the 20th anniversary of the Bugatti Veyron, and hosted several factory displays of Bentley, Bugatti, Czinger, Hennessey, Karma, Koenigsegg, Lamborghini, McLaren, Pagani, and Rolls-Royce. The total value of the year's car display of hypercars and antiques was estimated by Forbes to be over US$1 billion.

The 2026 event featured several global debuts for several cars, including brands Aston Martin, Bentley, Czinger, Hennessey, Lanzante, Pagani, and Shelby, as well as aircraft manufacturer displays of Cirrus Aircraft and Dassault Falcon. The world premiere of the Aston Martin Valhalla Spider and Pagani Huayra 70 Anima was unveiled at the event, with the McLaren McL 6GT staged its first public appearance. The 2026 event also hosted the Hagerty Broad Arrow auctions at the Wynn, which consisted of a record-setting $92.8 million in sales. The entire show field as a whole accounted for 385 cars and $1.3 billion in total vehicle value, with approximately 7,500 people attending the event.

== Tour d'Elegance ==
On the day after the Saturday Concours event, many of the participating supercars and antiques tour the Las Vegas Strip in a motorcade parade with Las Vegas Metro Police escorts.

== Best of Show winners ==
Below is a list of the Best of Show award of the concours event.

| Year | Site | Pre-war Winner | Pre-war Vehicle | Post-war Winner | Post-war Vehicle |
|---|---|---|---|---|---|
| 2019 | Dragonridge Country Club | Nethercutt Collection (Jack & Helen Nethercutt) | 1931 Bugatti Type 51 Dubos Coupe | Kevin & Connor Cogan | 1953 Ferrari 250 Europa Vignale |
| 2021 | Las Vegas Ballpark | Michael Sullivan | 1936 Packard Gentlemen’s Tailback Speedster | Michael Hammer | 1963 Rolls-Royce Silver Cloud III |
| 2022 | Wynn Las Vegas | Nethercutt Collection (Jack & Helen Nethercutt) | 1933 Duesenberg SJ Arlington Torpedo "Twenty Grand" | Mullin Automotive Museum (Peter & Merle Mullin) | 1951 Delahaye 235 Roadster |
| 2023 | Wynn Las Vegas | Harry Yeaggy | 1935 Duesenberg SJ "Mormon Meteor" | Jeffrey Maier | 1969 Lamborghini Miura S |
| 2024 | Wynn Las Vegas | William Lyon family | 1931 Duesenberg Model J Taper Tail Speedster | David MacNeil | Ferrari 250 GTO Berlinetta |
| 2025 | Wynn Las Vegas | Bruce McCaw | 1929 Mercedes-Benz Barker Tourer | Brian Ross | 1951 Ferrari 212 Export |
| 2026 | Wynn Las Vegas | Nethercutt Collection (Cameron Richards) | 1933 Hispano-Suiza J12 | Thomas Peck | 1954 Ferrari 375 MM Ghia |

=== Trophy design ===
The designs of the Best of Show and honorary individual trophies "The Helene Awards" are modeled after Helene Rother, the first woman to be an automotive designer at GM in 1943 after being hired by Harley Earl, and later an Automotive Hall of Fame inductee.
