= J.B. Nethercutt =

American businessman (1913–2004)

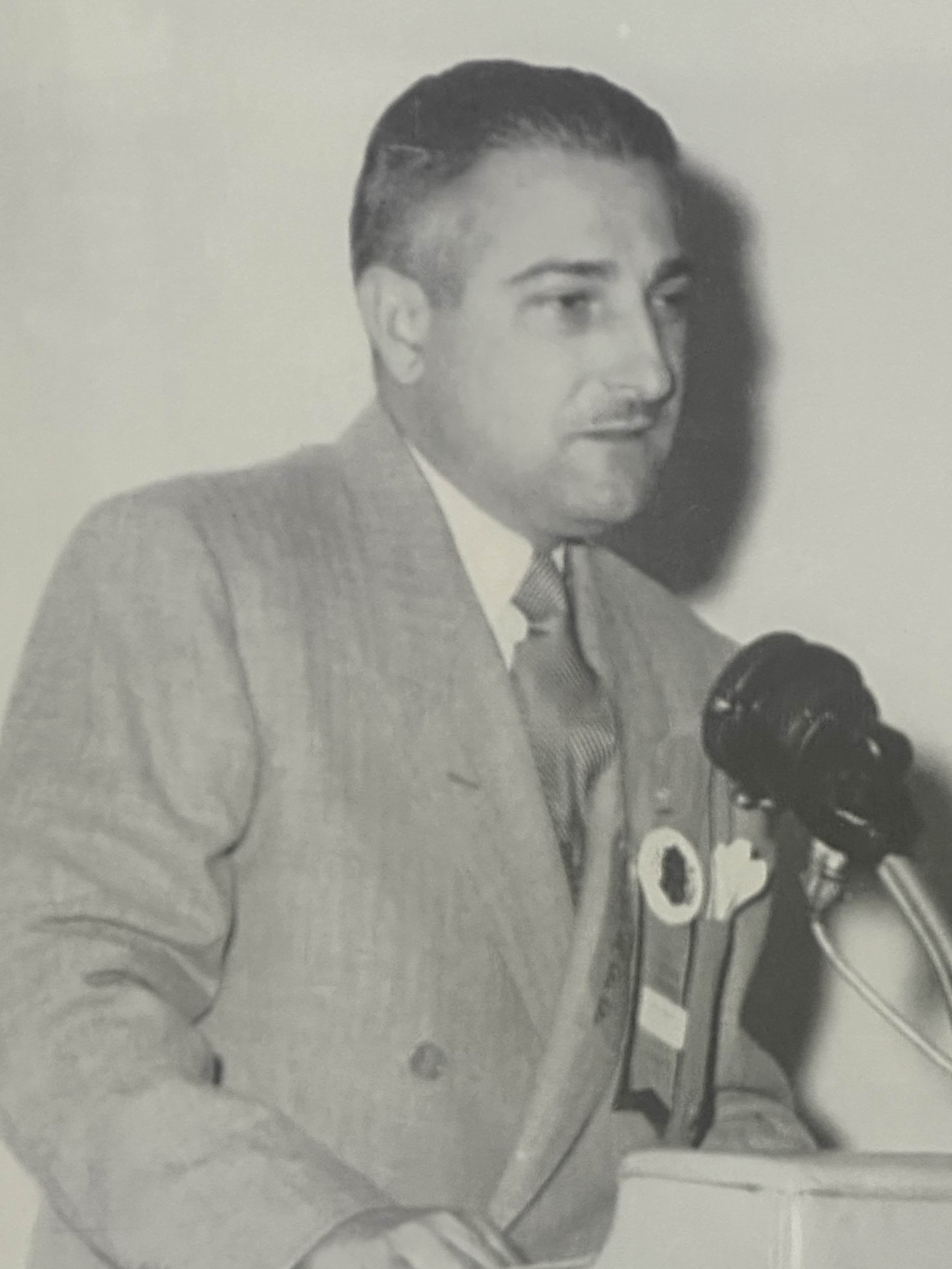
- Nethercutt in 1952
- Born: Jack Boison Nethercutt; October 11, 1913; South Bend, Indiana, U.S.
- Died: December 6, 2004 (aged 91); Santa Monica, California, U.S.
- Education: California Institute of Technology (dropped out)
- Spouse: Dorothy Sykes (m. 1933; died 2004)
- Children: Jack • Robert
- Family: Nethercutt-Richards

Jack Boison Nethercutt (October 11, 1913 – December 6, 2004) was an American businessman and car collector. He was the founder and namesake of the Nethercutt Collection, through which he is considered a pioneer of car collecting. Nethercutt holds the record for the most Best of Show titles (6) at the Pebble Beach Concours d'Elegance.

He co-founded Merle Norman Cosmetics in 1931 with his aunt Merle Norman and started as a delivery peddler for her early products, later ascending to the positions of chairman and chief executive officer of the company. He also served as a board member of the national Personal Care Products Council trade association and was president of the California Cosmetics Association.

Nethercutt used his wealth to collect over 200 antique and prestigious cars. In 1971 founded the Nethercutt Collection to house them, later also becoming a music museum. Within his car collection he oversaw the restoration of dozens of cars including the Bugatti Dubos and Duesenberg Twenty Grand, two of the most valuable cars in the world. He was posthumously inducted into the American Theatre Organ Society hall of fame in 2005.

== Early life and education ==
Nethercutt was born in South Bend, Indiana, United States, to Carl and Florence Nethercutt with two other siblings. At the age of 9, his mother died and he moved to Santa Monica, California in 1923 to live with his aunt, Merle Norman and Uncle, Andy Norman.

He attended Santa Monica High School and later enrolled to study chemistry at the California Institute of Technology. During his time in college, his aunt had created a small local cosmetics business in her home, making formulas in her kitchen. He dropped out of college to help her with the business.

== Career ==
=== Merle Norman Cosmetics ===
In 1931, Nethercutt's aunt spent $150 to open a small local cosmetics studio named Merle Norman Cosmetics in downtown Santa Monica to sell their homemade products. Norman created the products and Nethercutt peddled to dealers on his bicycle, picking up discarded boxes from groceries for packing shipments. By 1934, the company had expanded to 94 independently owned franchises across the country, the majority of which were owned by women. Nethercutt later served as Vice-Chairman of Merle Norman until Norman stepped down in 1963. In 1969, Nethercutt took the private family owned enterprise public on the American Stock Exchange. In 1974, Nethercutt purchased all the public stock back at roughly US$10 million, roughly $55 million adjusted for inflation. Following his purchase, he would again make Merle Norman a privately owned company.

Under his tenure, Merle Norman was recognized as one of the top 10 largest American cosmetic companies by People magazine. By 1981, Nethercutt spent $5 million on Merle Norman's first nationwide advertising campaign, which had previously only used word-of-mouth marketing. The company also had begun experimentally selling in European markets, specifically Switzerland and Austria, earning a million dollars in first year sales. By the end of 1981, Merle Norman as a whole made over US$130 million and had expanded to over 2,700 studios in the US and Canada. In 1993 Nethercutt stepped down as CEO but remained the chairman of the board. In 1999 he directed the refurbishment of all Merle Norman studios in North America for a universal consistent interior design, which was last updated in the late 70s. By 2004, Merle Norman had expanded to eight countries internationally and was consistently in the top 50 of Entrepreneur magazine's Franchise 500. The company had a revenue of over $100 million and he passed the company down to his son, Jack Nethercutt II.

=== Cosmetic committee positions ===
Nethercutt served as the President of the California Cosmetics Association. He was on both the board of directors and executive committee of the national Personal Care Products Council trade association.

== Cars ==
In 1956, Nethercutt purchased two cars, a 1936 Duesenberg Convertible Roadster for $5,000 and a 1930 DuPont Town Car for $500, which both needed restoration. He estimated the restoration of the DuPont would take a few weeks, but ended up taking over 18 months and over $65,000. In 1958, his prolonged project to rebuild his DuPont was not in vain and he won Best of Show at the Pebble Beach Concours d'Elegance. In 1971, Nethercutt purchased a large land lot in the Los Angeles neighborhood of Sylmar. Construction began on a personal 60,000 square-foot 10 story tall building with six floors to house his vehicles and other antique collections, featuring his private penthouse on the top floor. The Nethercutt Collection was built next to a Merle Norman manufacturing plant.

The first two stories of the tower, the Lower and Grand Salon, feature his vehicle collection of 30 cars on display. The third story features an awards room from concours competitions and collection of hood ornaments. The fourth story consists of a music room with several large antique music boxes and player pianos, with a Wurlitzer theatre organ in the centerpiece of the room. The fourth floor also featured a Louis XV style dining room with a private chef for his family and friends. The fifth floor has a theatre and a large collection of pianos. The top floor featured his private penthouse. The collection's first four floors are open to the public free of charge with reserved guided tours.

In the late 1970s, Nethercutt purchased the Twenty Grand, the only 1933 Rollston Arlington Torpedo-bodied Duesenberg SJ and gave it a full original restoration, changing the exterior color from black to a metallic silver and refining the interior. Once the restoration was completed, Nethercutt entered it into Pebble Beach in 1980 and won Best of Show. Because of the car's reputation and beauty, it was exhibited in Essen, Germany as one of The Ten Most Beautiful Cars in the World.

In 1984 he bought back a 1936 Duesenberg Convertible Coupe for $800,000 that he sold to Las Vegas-based businessman William F. Harrah in 1961 for $5,000.

Over the period of 1959 to 2000 he gave the Bugatti Type 51 Dubos several restorations from its reverted Grand Prix No. 51133 chassis design to its former famous Dubos Coupe design with a dark purple paint.

In the early 2000s, the Nethercutt Collection expanded with a 40,000 square foot addition to the tower and a 60,000 square foot new display building directly across the street called the Nethercutt Museum, which is self-guided. Outside of the museum are his CPR steam locomotive Royal Hudson No. 2839 with a 1912 Pullman private car. By 2004, Nethercutt Collection and Museum included nearly 250 automobiles and led Autoweek to call the Nethercutt Collection one of America's five greatest automobile museums. Jay Leno described Nethercutt's collection as a "Smithsonian-style effort on the history of transportation in America" and "the hall of fame for cars." Nethercutt passed his company and the collection down to his son Jack with his wife, Helen.

Every year, Nethercutt would take dozens of cars from the collection with family, friends, and invited guests on a cruise through the hills to a picnic at Frazier Park with catered foods from the professional chefs at the collection. The event was described as one of the most exclusive items on any car lover's wish list. As Autoweek magazine put it, "You can be as rich as Bill Gates or have a collection as big as that of the Sultan of Brunei, but you don't get a personal invitation from J.B. Nethercutt himself."

He received widespread recognition as a notable car restorer.

=== Concours d'Elegance ===
Nethercutt competed in dozens of Concours d'Elegance shows in North America with his cars from the collection and was one of the most successful competitors in history. He holds the most Best of Show victories at the pinnacle Pebble Beach Concours d'Elegance at six: 1958 with a duPont Model G Merrimac Town Car, 1959 with a Bugatti Type 57C Gangloff Atalante Coupe, 1969 with a Duesenberg J Murphy Dual Cowl Phaeton, 1970 with a Daimler Double-Six 50 Royal Limousine, 1980 with the Duesenberg Twenty Grand, and 1992 with a Rolls-Royce Phantom II Brewster Town Car.

Nethercutt is widely regarded to be the greatest car restorer of all time.

== Philanthropy ==
In 1985 he donated US$1 million to the town of Kenora, Canada for a new emergency department at the hospital. In 1986, he donated several million to the UCLA Medical Center, Santa Monica, which led to the construction of the six-story Merle Norman Pavilion complex.

== Personal life ==
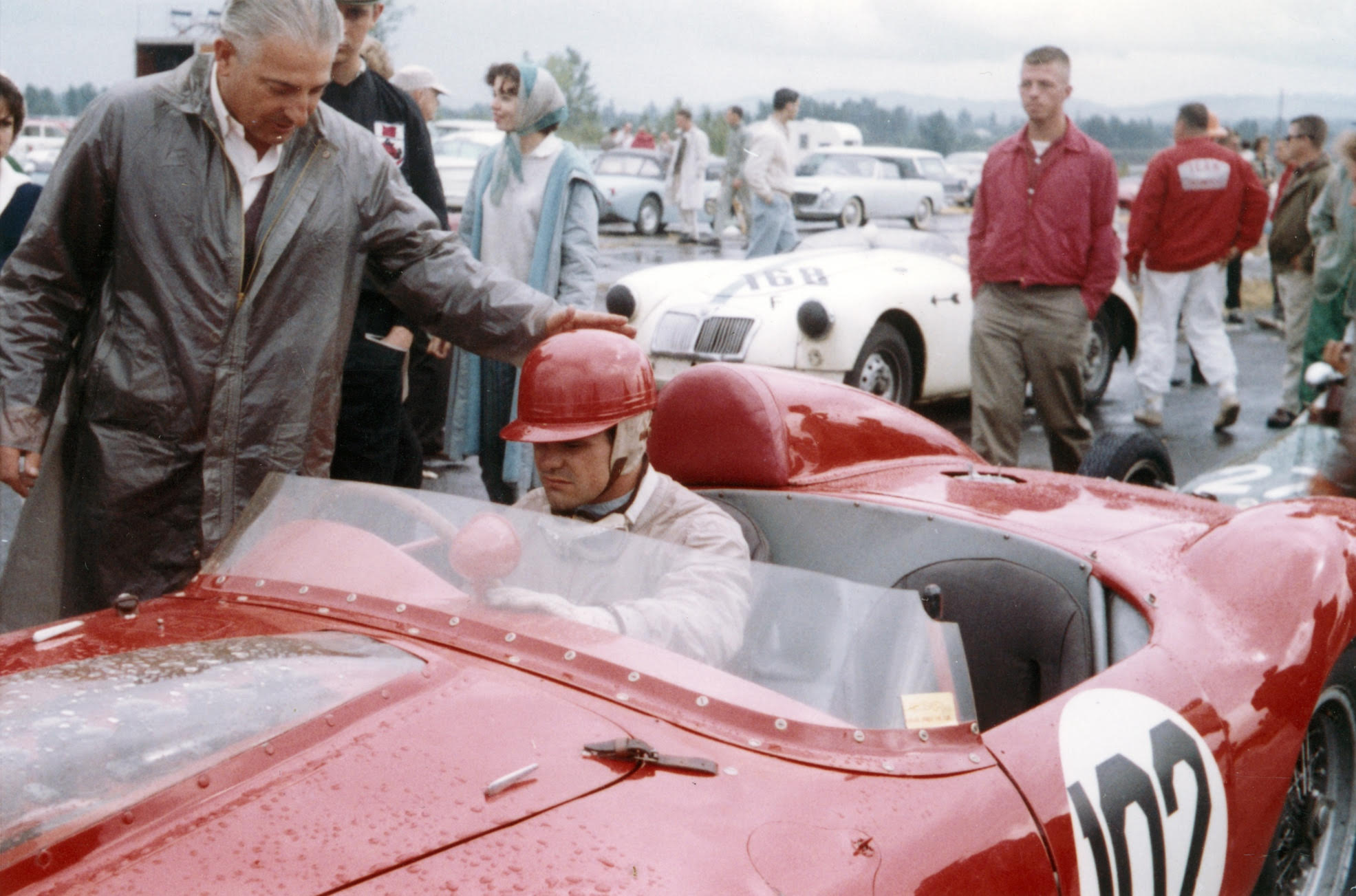
J.B. and his son, Jack

Nethercutt married his high school sweetheart Dorothy Sykes in 1933. Dorothy was a collector of David Winter sculpted ceramics, including cottages, miniature pianos, and dolls which are featured in the Nethercutt Collection. Their marriage lasted over 70 years and they had two children, Jack and Robert, later having two grandchildren. Through Jack and his wife Helen he had three great-grandchildren, the Richards.

Nethercutt was friends with fellow Los Angeles-based car enthusiasts and collectors Jay Leno, Barry Meguiar, and Bruce Meyer.

He was an avid fisher and frequently visited Lake of the Woods near Kenora, Canada and owned a private island. Nethercutt once diverted his plane to Kenora for a fry feast at Ye Old Chip Truck.

His San Sylmar estate was one of the largest houses in the United States at 60,000 square feet. It included a Louis XV style dining room and a large industrial kitchen that J.B. used for private dinners with French private chef Yvon Hunckler, who previously cooked for The Beverly Hills Hotel, Grand Hotel Birmingham, and Hôtel de Paris in Monaco. The sixth floor penthouse included a full balcony and a rotating Rococo-style bedroom overlooking the San Gabriel Mountains.

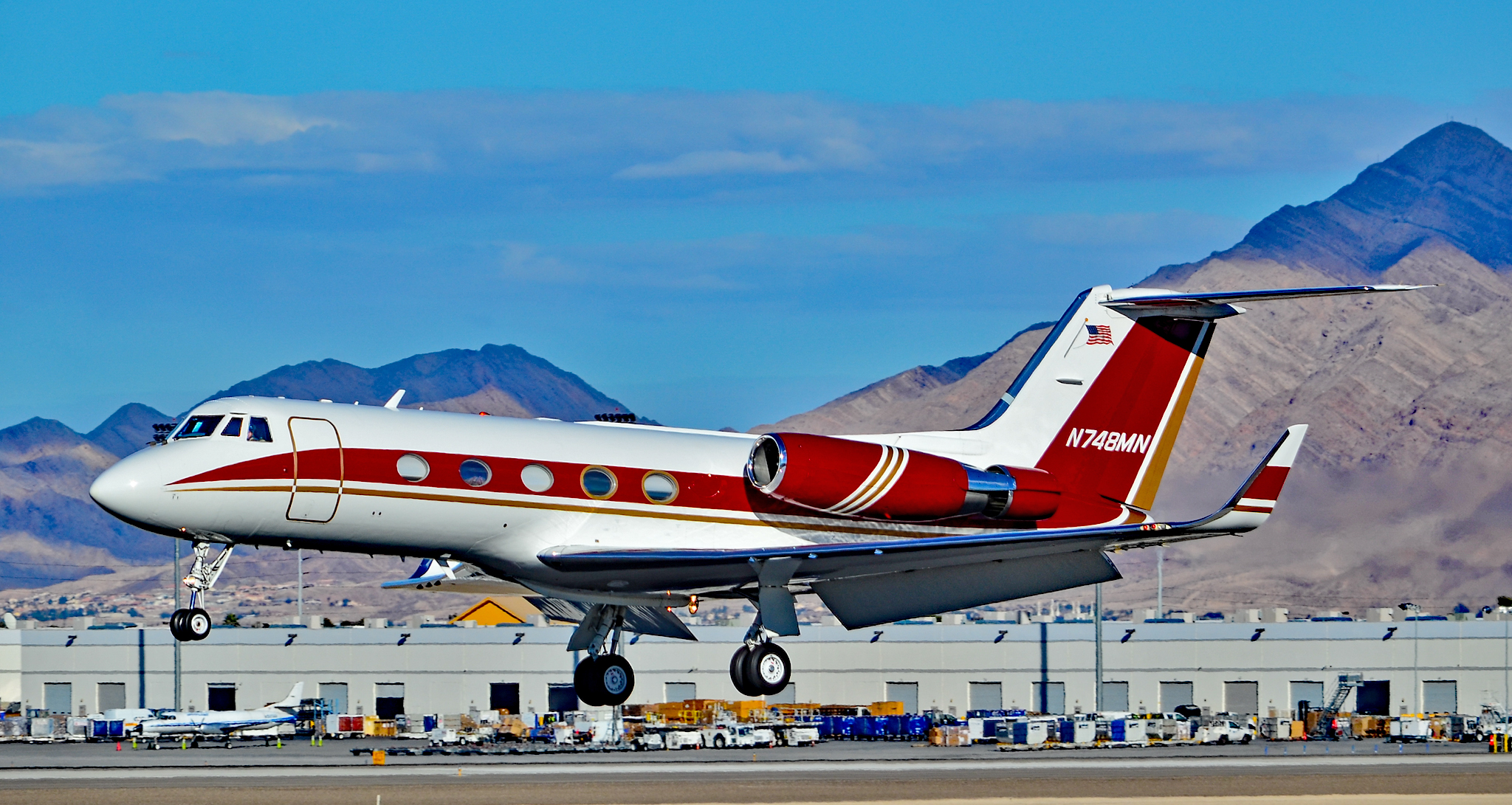
J.B. Nethercutt's former Gulfstream II

Nethercutt owned several private aircraft through Merle Norman Aviation: a Gulfstream I, Gulfstream II, and a Cessna 206, alongside a small helicopter fleet.

== Awards and honors ==
He won the 2001 Meguiar's Award for his 50 years of dedication to the restoration of historic automobiles. He was posthumously inducted into the American Theatre Organ Society hall of fame in 2005. The J.B. & Dorothy Nethercutt Most Elegant Closed Car Award at the Pebble Beach Concours d'Elegance is named in their honor. The Nethercutt Emergency Center at the UCLA Medical Center, Santa Monica was posthumously named after him. A road in Kenora was named after him in 2001.

== Death ==
Nethercutt died on December 6, 2004, in Santa Monica.
