= Amelia Island Concours d'Elegance =

Automobile show of classic and sports cars

Amelia Island Concours d'Elegance logo

The Amelia Island Concours d'Elegance is an automotive charitable event held each year during the second weekend in March at The Ritz-Carlton Amelia Island in Amelia Island, Florida. A New York Times article about celebrity car ownership listed "the nation's top concours d'elegance: Pebble Beach in California, Meadow Brook in Michigan, Amelia Island in Florida, and the Louis Vuitton Classic in midtown Manhattan."

A concours d'elegance (French, literally "a competition of elegance") is, according to The New York Times writer Keith Martin, like a "beauty pageant for rare and elegant cars". Each entry is rated for authenticity, function, history, style, and quality of restoration by a team of judges that includes specialists for each car type. A perfect score is 100, but any imperfection, no matter how slight, requires a fractional point deduction. Classes are arranged by type, marque, coachbuilder, country of origin, or time period.

Judges select first-, second-, and third-place finishers for each class in the event, and the judges confer the best of show award on one car from the group of first-place winners. In addition, a group of honorary judges—typically individuals who have made significant contributions to the automotive industry or motorsports—give subjective awards to recognize standout vehicles regardless of class ribbons, as well as memorial awards created to honor automotive industry personages.

== History ==
Businessman and car collector Bill Warner, a photographer and writer for Road & Track magazine since 1971, founded the Amelia Island Concours d'Elegance in 1996 at the urging of other northeast Florida auto enthusiasts who wanted a classic car show in Florida like the Pebble Beach Concours d'Elegance in California. Warner selected Community Hospice of Northeast Florida, which had provided service to his parents as well as his wife, as the beneficiary of the event. The first event was held April 6, 1996, at the Ritz-Carlton Amelia Island. Warner assembled a group of 163 cars, and attendance was around 2,200.

By 1999, attendance had increased to 8,500, 205 cars were exhibited, and $268,000 was raised for Community Hospice. The New York Times assigned a reporter to write a story. In his full-page feature article, Keith Martin stated, "The Amelia Island event, which is sponsored by Mercedes-Benz, is the only one in its region to aspire to the same standard of excellence (as the) Concours d'Elegance at Pebble Beach, in California, as well as the Louis Vuitton Classic at Rockefeller Center".

This event was moved from March to May in 2021 and is scheduled to return to March the next year. Also in 2021, the event was bought by Hagerty.

== Events ==
Each year's Amelia Island Concours honors an outstanding person from motorsports, a featured marque (manufacturer) and/or theme, plus judging and awards for each class of the Field of Dreams, the showcase exhibition. Events have included a golf tournament, automobile auctions, art and fashion shows, dinners with honored guests, silent auctions of memorabilia, charity raffles, and autograph sessions. The top concours awards are the Best of Show Concours d'Elegance and the Best of Show Concours de Sport. Additionally, there are various corporate awards, vehicle class awards, and special awards such as the People's Choice award.

Entrants submit an application for each car, and the concours field is selected from each year's pool of applicants. Vehicles newer than 1974 models are normally not eligible to enter, and vehicle participation is by invitation only. Many collectors spend years and hundreds of thousands of dollars purchasing and restoring a car in hopes of being chosen. Once a car is accepted to the Concours, it cannot again be entered in the event for five years, with three exceptions: if the ownership of the car has changed, the car has been restored, or if the featured marque is obscure, the Concours car selection committee can reach out to invite cars of varying restoration quality—or cars that have previously been entered in the Concours—in order to provide a healthy representation of the marque for exhibition.

Most of the owners display their cars because they want everyone who appreciates style and beauty to see their project. Most view the weekend as a social gathering rather than a special interest event. The organizers attempt to invite vehicles from varying time periods so that spectators who prefer a certain style of car will always find several examples to examine. Many of the competing cars are valued in the hundreds of thousands of dollars, with some worth millions. For this reason, along with its setting and amenities, the Amelia Island Concours is considered one of the premier concourses in the world.

Show summaries
Year	Honoree	Marque/theme	Attendance	Best in Show Concours d'Elegance	Best in Show Concours de Sport
2019	Jacky Ickx	Coachbuilt Volkswagens, Dragsters and Funny Cars, Porsche 962 race cars, Jaguar XK120s, Head of State Cars, Ferrari 250 GT SWB, and Cars of Rock Stars		1938 Mercedes-Benz 540K Autobahn-Kurier	1957 Ferrari 335 S
2018	Emerson Fittipaldi	Cars of Martini Racing; Cars of ‘Big Daddy’ Ed Roth; the 50th anniversary of the Ferrari Daytona; IMSA Grand Touring Prototypes; Jaguar E-Type; the 70th anniversary of N.A.R.T; Pre-War MGs		1929 Duesenberg J/SJ convertible	1963 Ferrari 250/275P
2017	Al Unser Jr.	Jaguar D-Type; Chevrolet Camaro, Mercedes-Benz Gullwings The Cars of the Movies		1935 Duesenberg SJ 582	1939 Alfa Romeo 8C 2900 Lungo Spider
2016	Hans-Joachim Stuck	Trophy Cars		1930 Rolls-Royce Phantom II Town Car	1952 Pegaso Z-102 BS 2.5 Cupula Coupe
2015	Stirling Moss	Stutz, Cars of the Cowboys, Speedsters, Orphan Concepts, Horseless Carriages, Forgotten Fiberglass	32,000	1930 Cord L-29 Speedster	1932 Alfa Romeo 8C 2300 Zagato Spider
2014	Jochen Mass	Offenhauser-powered cars; American Underslung; Selections from Zagato	29,000	1937 Horch 853	1958 Scarab Mark II Sport Racer
2013	Sam Posey	Porsche 911, Corvette Sting Ray, Ford GT40, Cars of Harry Miller, Ducati Motorcycles	25,000	1936 Duesenberg SJN	1968 Ford GT40
2012	Vic Elford	Ferrari GTO; Shelby Cobra; Custom Coachwork Cadillacs	23,000	1962 Ferrari 330 LM	1938 Bugatti Type 57
2011	Bobby Rahal	Duesenberg; Allard; Kurtis	15,000	1933 Duesenberg SJN Arlington Torpedo Sedan	1935 Duesenberg SJ Speedster (Mormon Meteor)
2010	Richard Petty	40th anniversary of Porsche's inaugural victory at the 24 Hours of Daytona & Le Mans; the last Cuban Grand Prix	18,000	1937 Mercedes-Benz 540K Special Roadster	1960 Maserati Tipo 61
2009	David Hobbs	Bohman & Schwartz	15,000	1931 Voisin C20 Demi-Berline	1923 Miller Special 122 Supercharged
2008	Parnelli Jones	100th Anniversary of GM, Model T, New York-to-Paris "Great Race" of 1908	20,000	1935 Duesenberg J Roadster	1957 Ferrari 335 Sport
2007	Derek Bell	Discontinued road races: Mille Miglia, Targa Florio, Carrera Panamericana, Isle of Man TT motorcycle race	18,000	1937 Talbot-Lago T-150 CSS	1953 Ferrari 375 MM
2006	Johnny Rutherford	Stanley Steamer	18,000	1931 DuPont Model H Sport Phaeton	1961 Ferrari 250 TRI/61
2005	Bobby Allison	Alfa Romeo & 50th Anniversary of Chevy small block V8	18,000	1931 Bugatti Type 51 Dubos	1953 Porsche 550 Coupe
2004	Bobby Unser	100th Anniversary of Rolls-Royce	18,000	1934 Voisin C-15	Award did not exist until 2005.
2003	Jim Hall	50th Anniversary of Corvette and 100th Anniversary of Buick	Rain	1958 Dual-Ghia Chrysler-powered	
2002	Dan Gurney	100th Anniversary of Cadillac	14,000	1937 Delage D8 120SS Aerodynamic Coupe	
2001	John Surtees	100th Anniversary of Pierce-Arrow	11,000	1937 Hispano Suiza Dubonnet	
2000	Brian Redman	Mercer	8,500	1938 Alfa Romeo 8C 2900	
1999	Carroll Shelby	100th Anniversary of Packard	7,200	1938 Delage D8 120	
1998	Hurley Haywood	50th Anniversary of Porsche	6,500	1932 Lincoln KB Dual Cowl Phaeton	
1997	Phil Hill	50th Anniversary of Ferrari	3,500	1937 Mercedes-Benz 540K Special Roadster	
1996	Sir Stirling Moss	Mercedes-Benz	2,200	1938 Talbot-Lago 150SS Figoni & Falaschi	

== Charitable contributions ==
The non-profit Amelia Island Concours d'Elegance Foundation was formed in 2000 to organize and manage the workload of more than 300 volunteers. The proceeds of the Amelia Island Concours d'Elegance have helped support Community Hospice of Northeast Florida with total contributions of over $1.5 million through 2008. The event's goal is to raise at least $100,000 for Community Hospice each year. Other charities receiving funding include the Spina Bifida Association of Florida at Jacksonville, Shop with Cops, the Duval County 4-H Foundation, and the Navy Marine Corps Relief Society. The concours' foundation has donated over $3.5 million since 1996 to these charitable organizations.

== See also ==
- Concours d'Elegance
