= Jack Nethercutt II =

American businessman and race car driver

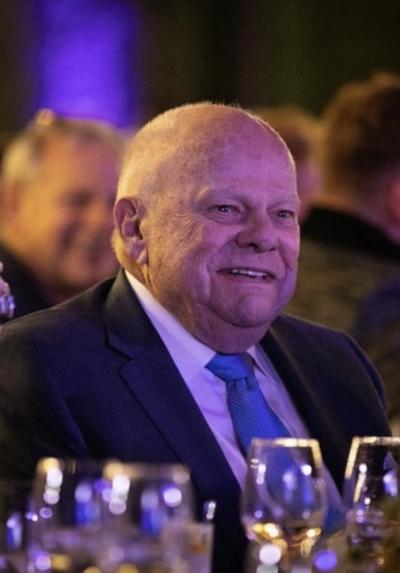
- Nethercutt in 2021
- Born: Jack Boison Nethercutt II; December 22, 1936 (age 89); Los Angeles, California, U.S.
- Education: University of Southern California
- Spouse: Helen Richards
- Father: J.B. Nethercutt
- Family: Nethercutt–Richards

Jack Boison Nethercutt II (born December 22, 1936) is an American businessman and former racing driver with Ferrari and Lotus. He is the chairman of Merle Norman Cosmetics and president of the Nethercutt Collection.

Nethercutt raced from 1957-1965 and notably used number #102. He competed in the World Sportscar Championship with Ferrari from 1960-1961, winning the 1960 12 Hours of Sebring in class (3rd overall) in a Ferrari 250 TR, and was a part of Ferrari's winning 1960 championship season. Nethercutt also raced in the USAC Road Racing Championship and United States Road Racing Championship. In 2004, he became the second president of the Nethercutt Collection and holds five Best of Show titles at the Amelia Island Concours d'Elegance.

== Early life ==
Nethercutt was born on December 22, 1936, the son to entrepreneur J.B. Nethercutt and Dorothy Sykes in Los Angeles, California. He attended the Harvard-Westlake School. Nethercutt graduated from the Marshall School of Business at University of Southern California in 1958.

== Racing career ==
Nethercutt entered professional auto racing in 1956 at the age of 19 while also studying in college, getting his funding primarily from his father. He began racing with the Lotus Eleven and notably used the number #102 throughout his career. With the Lotus he was featured on the cover of Road & Track Magazine. He raced the Ferrari 500 TRC from 1958 to 1960.

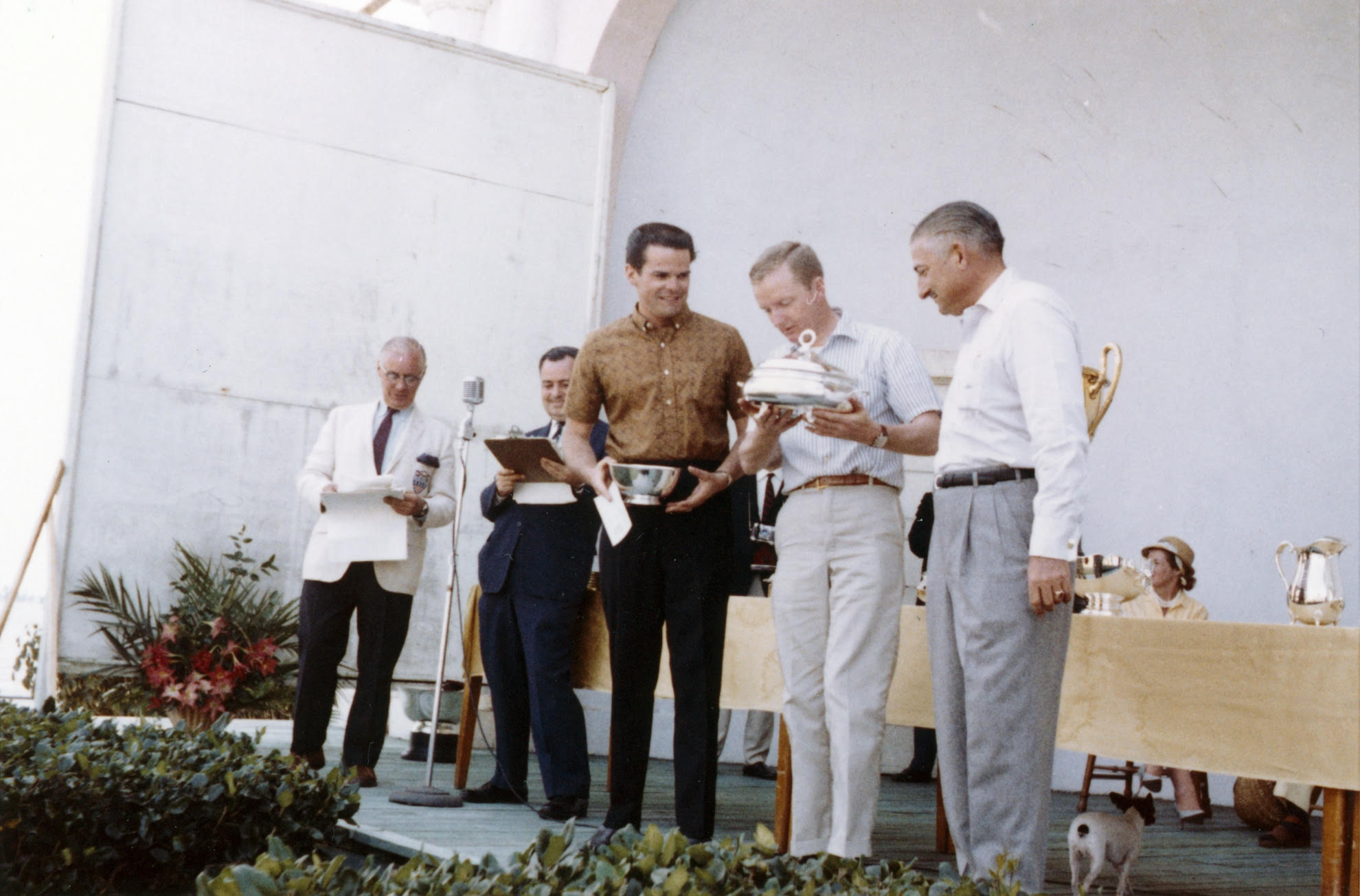
Nethercutt at the 1960 12 Hours of Sebring podium

In 1960, Nethercutt acquired the Ferrari 250 Testa Rossa and entered the World Sportscar Championship for the 1960 season. At the 1960 12 Hours of Sebring, Nethercutt finished in the podium third overall and won the S3.0 class after 186 laps with American co-driver Pete Lovely, scoring 4 manufacturer's championship points for the eventual 1960 season winners Ferrari. During the following 1961 season at the 1961 12 Hours of Sebring his Ferrari's oil pump broke on the first lap and the team was disqualified. Competing with the Ferrari 250 TR at the 1960 USAC Road Racing Championship, he and Lovely finished second in class and third overall behind Carroll Shelby and Ken Miles. He won the 1960 3 Hours of Westwood. In 1961 he sold his Ferrari for $25,000 because it was "last years racecar" and according in a 2023 interview Jay Leno, it was now worth over $30 million.

From 1961 to 1963, Nethercutt switched to a Lotus 19, competing in the Sports Car Club of America and achieved several podiums, including a victory at the 1962 SCCA Divisional. Nethercutt competed in the United States Grand Prix with the vehicle for one season in 1963.

=== Mirage racecar ===
In 1965, Nethercutt would build his custom racecar called the Mirage, which was envisioned as the pinnacle Can-Am design. The Mirage was supposed to debut two years earlier, but his father J.B. was against the vehicle's construction and would not fund it, which caused Nethercutt to experience financial constraints leading to its delay. Racing experts claim that if the Mirage was completed on time a couple of years earlier, it would have been internationally competitive because of its revolutionary design from its low drag aerodynamics. It was also one of the first racecars with a monocoque chassis and wheels, powered by a lightweight Oldsmobile V8 engine. The Mirage was test driven by Ken Miles. Nethercutt and the Mirage were featured on the cover of the Sports Car Graphic Magazine. The Mirage was later destroyed by J.B. in a dispute.

== Racing results ==
=== World Sportscar Championship ===
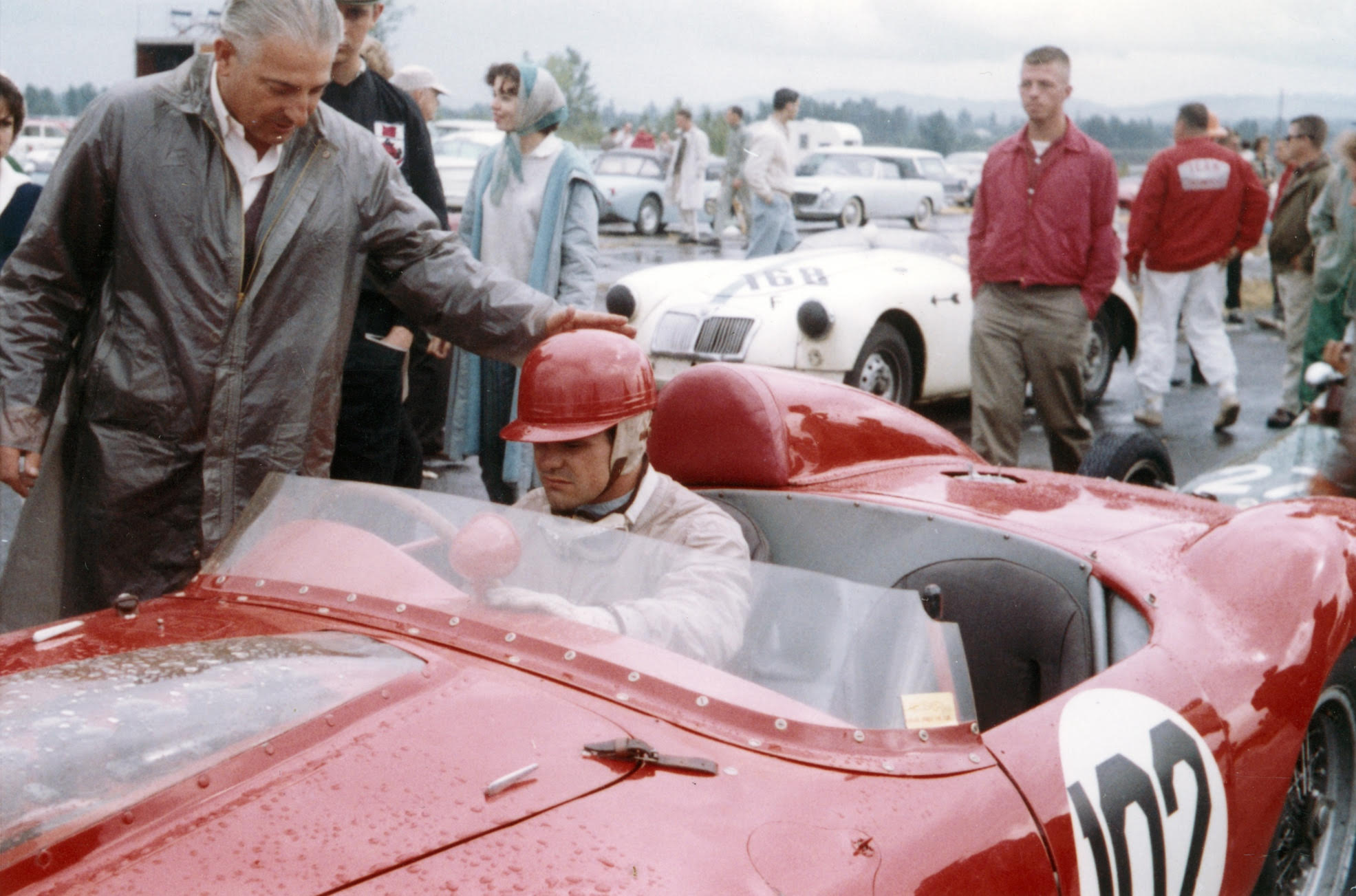
Jack and J.B. Nethercutt

==== 12 Hours of Sebring results ====
| Year | No | Car | Drivers | Class | Laps | Pos. | Class Pos. | Points |
|---|---|---|---|---|---|---|---|---|
| 1960 | 8 | Ferrari 250 Testa Rossa 59 Ferrari V12 2996 | (United States) Jack Nethercutt (United States) Pete Lovely | S3.0 | 186 | 3rd | 1st | 4 |
| 1961 | 9 | Ferrari 250 Testa Rossa 59 Ferrari V12 2996 | (United States) Jack Nethercutt (United States) Pete Lovely | S3.0 | 1 | DNF Oil Pump | | 0 |

=== Career results ===
(United States) Jack Nethercutt
| Vehicle | Years active | Win(s) | Podiums |
|---|---|---|---|
| Lotus Eleven | 1957-1958 | 0 | 1 |
| Ferrari 500 | 1958-1960 | 0 | 1 |
| Ferrari 250 TR | 1960-1961 | 3 | 6 |
| Lotus 19 | 1961-1964 | 1 | 8 |
| Mirage | 1965 | 0 | 0 |
| Total | 1957-1965 | 4 | 16 |

== Business career ==
In the 1980s to 1990s, Nethercutt and his wife Helen owned a luxury restaurant named Boison's near the Las Vegas Strip which won a Best of Las Vegas award from the Las Vegas Review-Journal. He became chairman and president of Merle Norman Cosmetics in 2004.

In 2004, he took over the Nethercutt Collection from his father and became its second president. He restored the 1931 Bugatti Type 51 Dubos in 2011. In 2020 Nethercutt bought back and restored his Lotus 19 racecar, which was completed in 2023. Nethercutt competed in several Concours d'Elegance competitions throughout the United States, notably achieving five Best of Show victories at the Amelia Island Concours d'Elegance in 2005, 2007, 2011, 2013, and 2016. He also won the Palos Verdes Concours d'Elegance in 2007, 2009, and 2012, Kirkland in 2007, Dana Point in 2011, and Las Vegas in 2019 and 2022.

== Personal life ==
Nethercutt had two children and later had a divorce. He married Helen Richards for his second marriage and later had three grandchildren from his step-son, Travis Richards.

He has donated millions to his alma mater, the University of Southern California, including for Merle Norman Stadium, USC Trojans women's beach volleyball, USC Trojans football, USC Trojans men's basketball, and the USC Trojan Marching Band.

Nethercutt is a fan of fishing.
