= One-off vehicle =

A one-off vehicle is a vehicle designed for normal circulation and produced in almost single units following specific instructions from the customer. Generally the model is made on a small or large series, with significant technical, functional and aesthetic variations between each unit. In the field of vehicles authorized to drive, the production of unique vehicles is reduced to almost one unit in each case. The easiest cases to analyze are those of cars and motorcycles.

Unique automobiles and unique motorcycles are usually kept and displayed in museums. Aeronautical vehicles, with notable exceptions, are not preserved in the same way (due to accidents and disappearances). Naval vehicles feature myriad unique models. A non-exclusive base of examples could be the field of sailing yachts and motorboats.

Some cases of non-legalized vehicles may be included in this article if they have particularly noticeable characteristics, such as engine, chassis, and body types.

== Origin of one-off ==
A one-off is something made or occurring only once, independently of any particular pattern. First used in 1934, this term is employed to differentiate singular items from those in a series: e.g. "the Lincoln Futura was a one-off". It has been suggested that it is a misspelling of "one-of", but this etymology is not supported by sources such as the Oxford English Dictionary.
