= Rollston =

Defunct American automotive coach builder

Rollston Company
- Industry: Automotive
- Founded: 1921; 105 years ago
- Founders: Harry Lonschein, Sam Blotkin
- Defunct: April 1938
- Fate: Bankruptcy
- Successor: Rollson, Inc.
- Headquarters: Manhattan, New York, United States
- Key people: Harry Lonschein, Sam Blotkin, Julius Veghso, Rudy Creteur
- Products: Coachwork

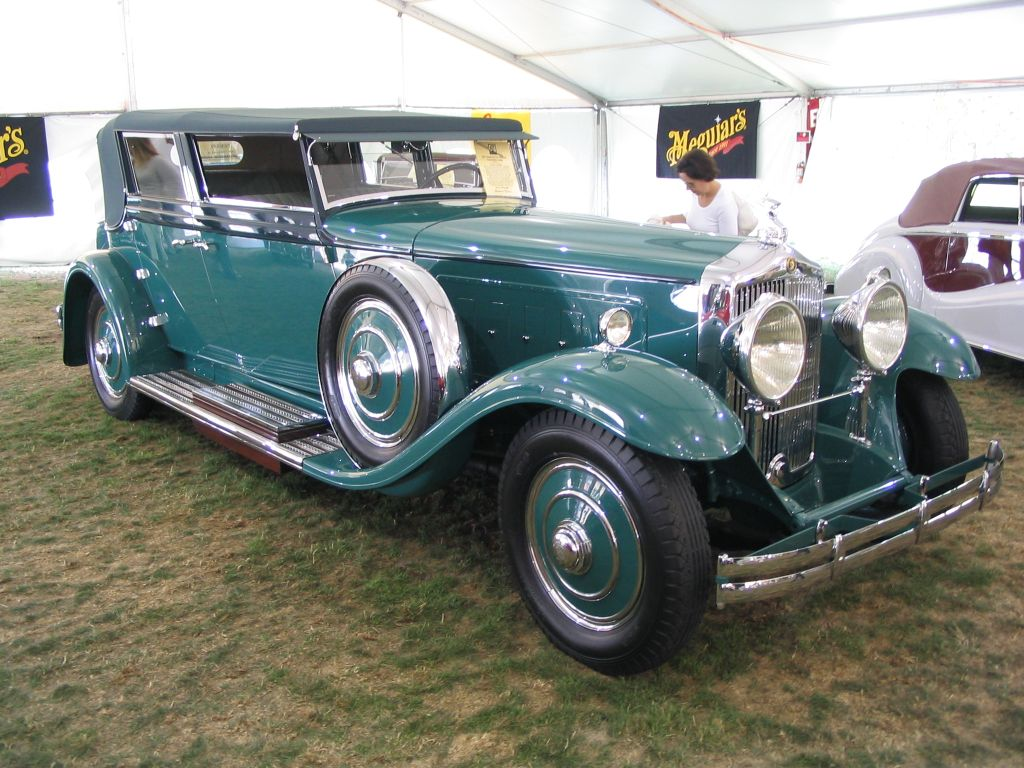
1931 Minerva - Rollston Coachwork

Rollston Company was an American coachbuilder producing luxury automobile bodies during the 1920s and 1930s readily acknowledged to be of the very highest quality.

After bankruptcy in 1938 some of the same owners began a very similar business under the name Rollson.

== History ==
Harry Lonschein was 16 when he became employed by Brewster & Co. He would found Rollston Company together with his partner Sam Blotkin in 1921. The business began as a repair shop at 244 West 49th Street in Manhattan. Their first factory was in a building on the corner of 12th Avenue and West 47th Street later expanding to all its four floors, 48,000 square feet.

Rollston built bodies for chassis supplied by Bugatti, Buick, Cadillac, Chrysler, Cord, Duesenberg, Ford, Hispano-Suiza, Lancia, Lincoln, Mercedes-Benz, Minerva, Packard, Peerless, Pierce-Arrow, Rolls-Royce, Stearns-Knight and Stutz.

Rollston closed in April 1938.

== Rollson, Inc. ==
Rollson, Inc.
- Predecessor: Rollston Company
- Founded: September 1938
- Founders: Harry Lonschein, Rudy Creteur, Hjalmar A. Holm, Frank Sever
- Headquarters: Plainview, New York, United States
- Products: Marine manufacturing

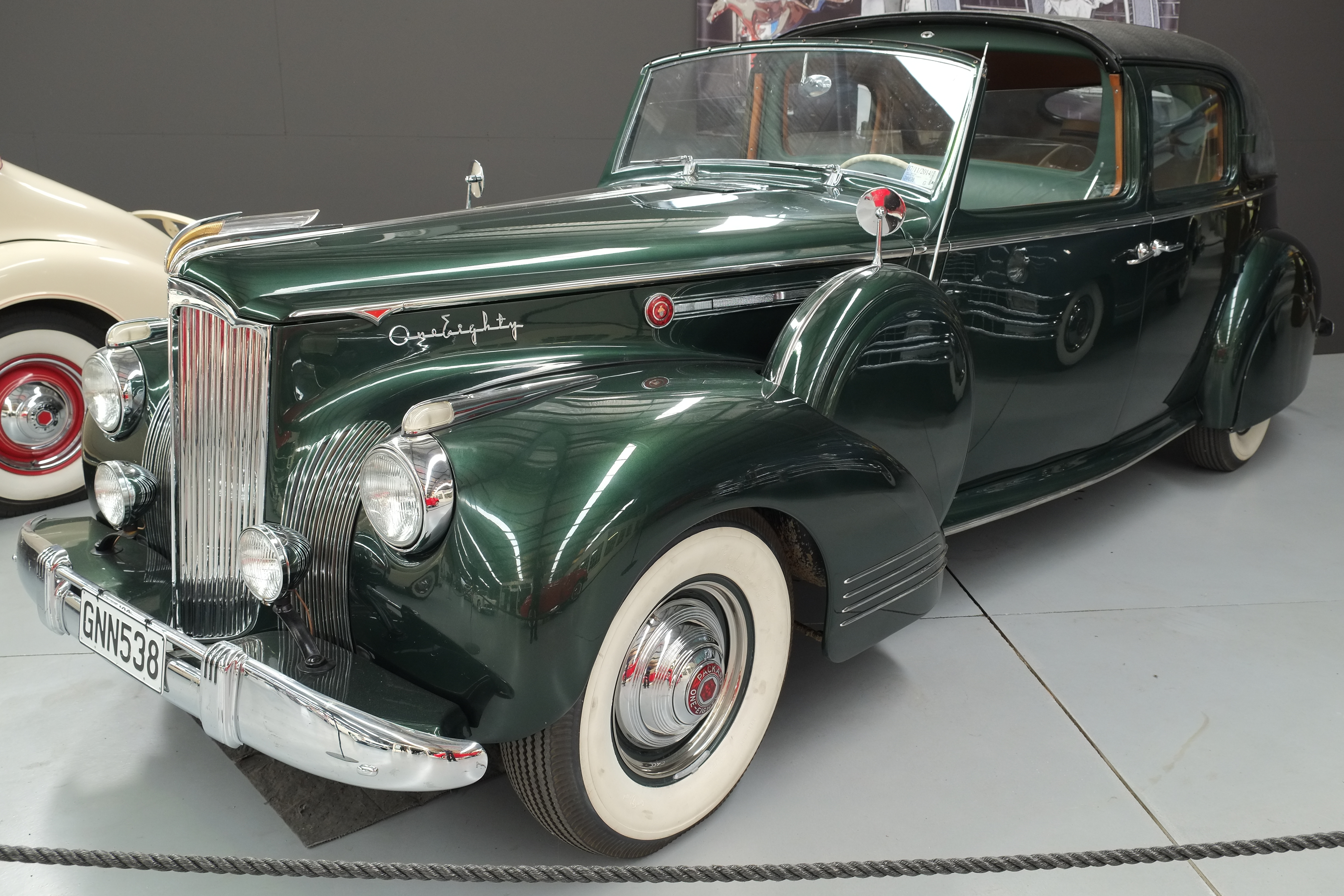
1941 Packard Custom Super Eight One-Eighty Town Car - Rollson coachwork

Rollson, Inc. was formed in September 1938 by four partners; Lonschein, Holm, Sever, and Creteur and continued to make bodies mainly for Packard chassis at 311 West 66th Street and West End Avenue.

During World War II, Rollson Inc. switched to small components for ships and fuselage sections and nose-cones for aircraft. A contract for Liberty ship cowl ventilators, toilet fixtures, life boat food tanks, storage bins, galley equipment, ship's doors, Pullman beds, berths and furniture.

After the war, Rollson did not produce car bodies but fitted out luxury ships, yachts and private aircraft in Plainview, Long Island, New York. In 2022 Rollson Inc. is listed as a marine hardware manufacturer operated by Rudolph Creteur.

== See also ==
- Rollston and Rollson at Coachbuilt.com
- Old Cars Weekly article on Rollston
- Coachwork by Rollston at Conceptcarz
