= Helen Nethercutt =

American businesswoman

- Born: Helen Ann Wilkins; September 12, 1952 (age 73); Buckingham, Illinois, U.S.
- Spouse(s): John Richards (div) Jack Nethercutt II
- Children: 2

Helen Richards-Nethercutt (born September 12, 1952) is an American autism philanthropist.

== Career ==
Helen Wilkins was born in 1952 in Buckingham, Illinois and graduated from Herscher High School in 1969. She married U.S. Army specialist John Richards and adopted the name Helen Richards. They had two children, Travis and an autistic son Trent. In 1980 she had a divorce and moved to Las Vegas, where she worked at a grocery store and would meet Jack Nethercutt II whom she later married. The couple operated a luxury restaurant named Boison's near the Las Vegas Strip. She became a financial contributor for the USC Trojans athletic program and donated for the Galen Center, Merle Norman Stadium, USC Trojans beach volleyball, and the Spirit of Troy marching band.

=== Autism charity ===
She has donated to several autism-friendly charities and schools within California, Nevada, and Illinois. She became a major financial contributor to the Exceptional Children's Foundation (ECF) based in Culver City, California, supporting housing and vehicles.
