= Pebble Beach Concours d'Elegance =

Annual classic automobile show held in Pebble Beach, California

Coordinates: 36°33′49″N 121°56′18″W

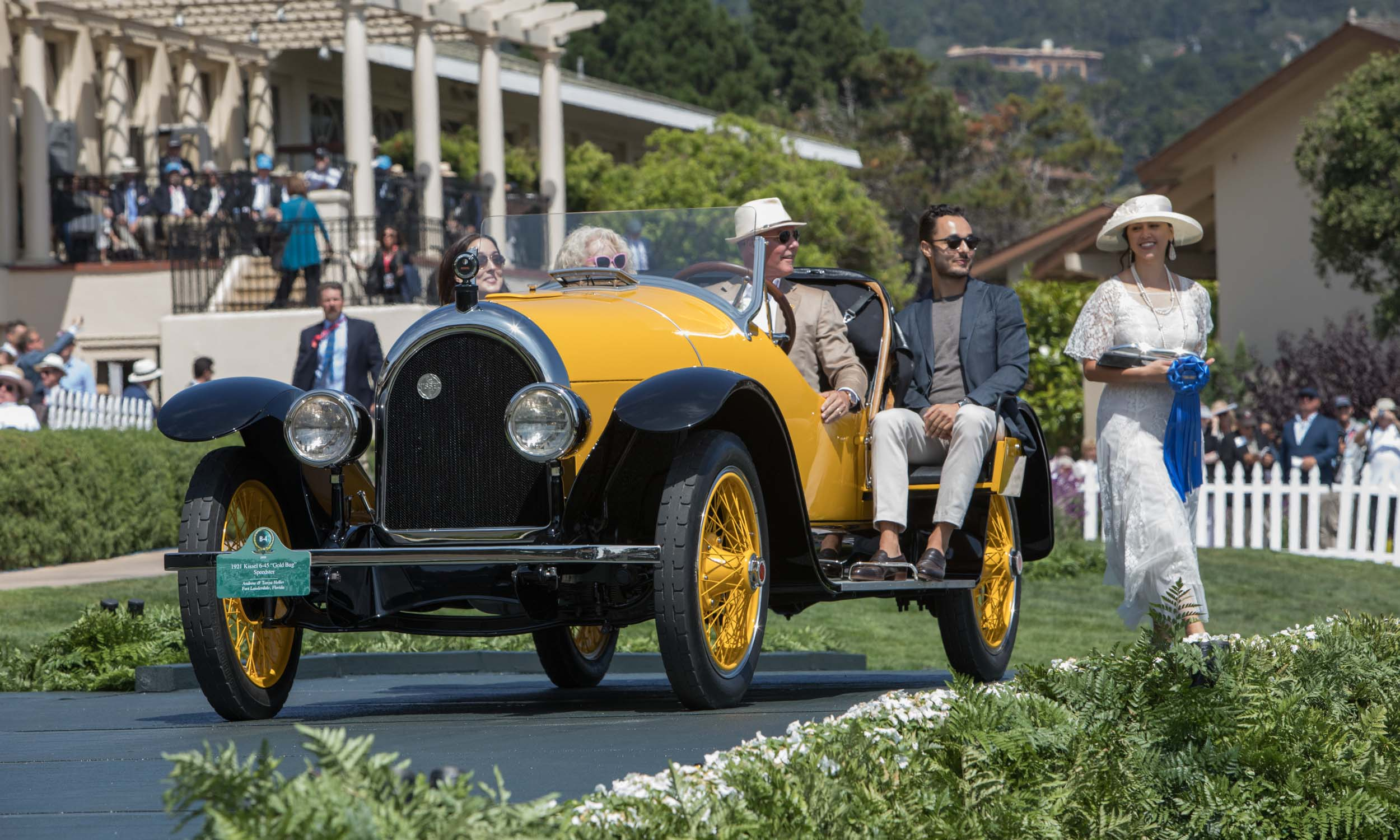
- Genre: Concours d'Elegance
- Frequency: Annual, held in August
- Locations: Pebble Beach Golf Links; Pebble Beach, California, U.S.
- Country: United States
- Inaugurated: August 1950 (76 years ago)
- Most recent: August 17, 2025
- Attendance: 15,000
- Website: pebblebeachconcours.net

The Pebble Beach Concours d'Elegance is an annual automotive event held on the Pebble Beach Golf Links in Pebble Beach, California. The finale of the annual Monterey Car Week, it is widely considered the most prestigious car show in the world and it is the pinnacle Concours d'Elegance competition worldwide.

A Concours d'Elegance (French, literally "a competition of elegance") is an event open to both prewar and postwar collector cars in which they are judged for authenticity, function, history, and style. Entrants are accepted through an application process, and classes are commonly arranged by type, marque (manufacturer), coachbuilder, country of origin, or time period. Judges select first-, second-, and third-place finishers for each class in the event, and the judges confer the pinnacle "Best of Show" award on one car from the group of first-place winners, which includes with an engraved trophy and engraved Rolex watch.

J.B. Nethercutt has won the most Best of Show titles with six, while the winning marques Bugatti and Mercedes-Benz are tied with ten wins each. In addition, a group of honorary judges—individuals who have made significant contributions to the automotive industry or motorsports—award a number of subjective awards to recognize standout vehicles regardless of class ribbons, as well as memorial awards created to honor specific automotive industry personages.

Dozens of world-renowned luxury and supercar brands use the event to officially debut new models and showcase their future concept cars, with many of the participating manufacturers having their own corporate display building for the duration of the event. Participating brands have included Aston Martin, Bentley, Bugatti, Ferrari, Koenigsegg, Lamborghini, McLaren, Rolls-Royce, and dozens of others. The concours also hosts Pebble Beach Auctions, which is primarily focused on high-end vehicles valued in the millions. Pebble Beach is one of the most-attended concours events worldwide, with approximately 15,000 spectators attending the 2012 event.

== History ==
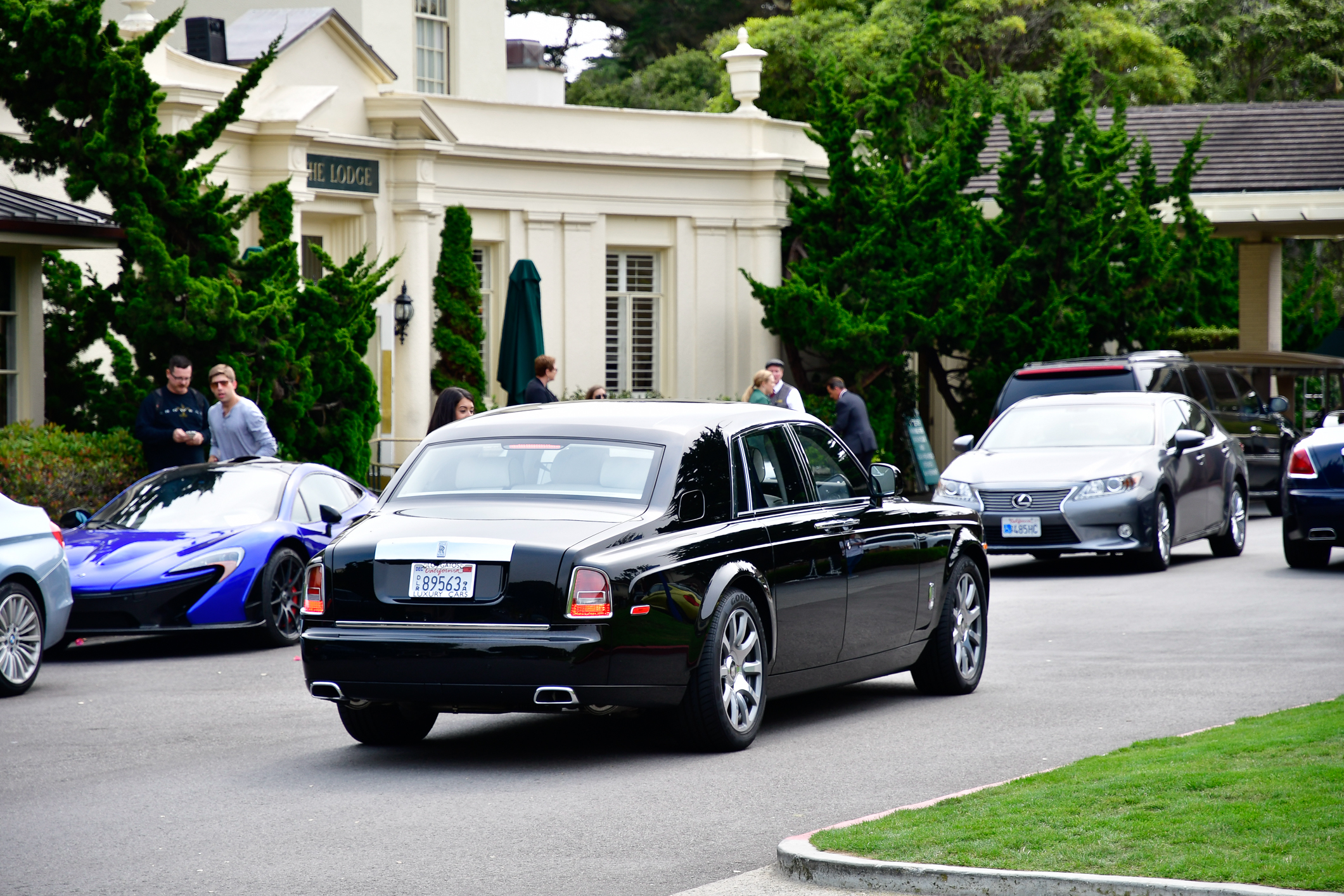
2016 Pebble Beach Concours d'Elegance

The Pebble Beach Concours d'Elegance was founded in 1950 as an adjunct to the Pebble Beach Road Race, a race event sponsored by the Sports Car Club of America and conducted on a circuit of closed public roads. The 1950 and 1951 Concours were held on a practice tee and driving range adjacent to the Beach Club, a private club near the Del Monte Lodge (now known as "The Lodge at Pebble Beach"). Thirty cars were exhibited on November 4, 1950, and a smaller field of 23 on May 27, 1951. In 1952, the event was moved to the 18th green of the Pebble Beach Golf Links, between the Lodge at Pebble Beach and the Pacific Ocean, overlooking Carmel Bay.

The Pebble Beach Concours d'Elegance has continued since 1950 with one missed year: in 1960, the show was cancelled due to scheduling conflicts. In addition, heavy rain at the event in 1963 and 1965 made the lawn area unusable, and so the cars were shown at the old start/finish line of the road race, near the horse stables now known as the Pebble Beach Equestrian Center.

In 2001, the event saw an introduction of a new category for preservation cars. This category was designed to "bear witness to the passage of time", including the so-called barn find car.

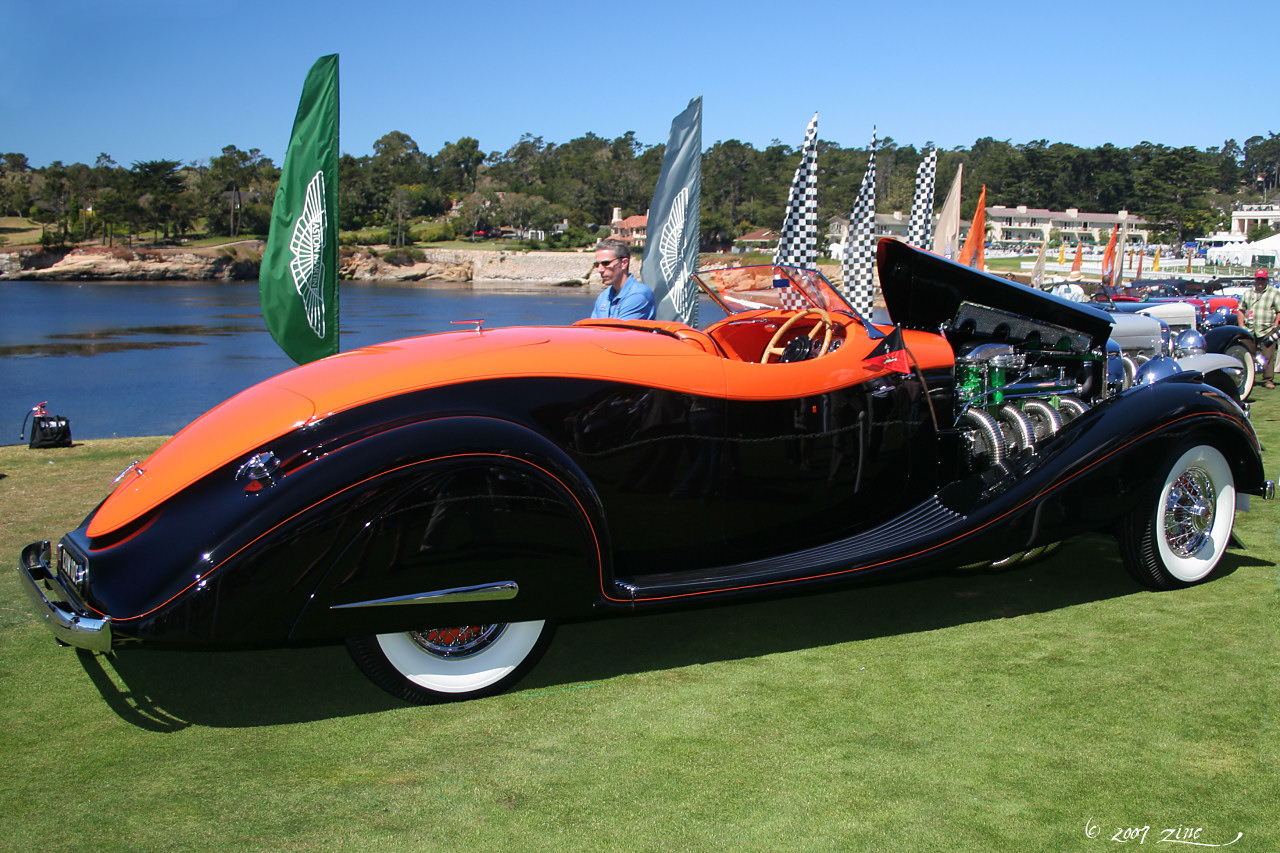
1935 Duesenberg Model J Gurney Nutting Speedster

The 2006 event saw 175 cars lining the 18th green and hole of Pebble Beach Golf Links with 25 judged classes, with cars brought to Pebble Beach from 27 states and 13 countries (including the U.S.). The event describes itself as "Exhibiting prewar and postwar automobiles along with the latest in concept car designs, the Pebble Beach Concours d'Elegance is the premiere concours in the world."

24 of the 175 cars in the field come from outside the U.S., representing Italy, England, France, Switzerland, Australia, China, Germany, Mexico, Czech Republic, Netherlands, and the Philippines. The total estimated cost of the vehicles spread across the 18th fairway at the 2006 event was US$200 million. From 227 cars in 2005, the 2006 event had a field reduced to 175 cars. Organizers said the change was made to allow more time to judge each car.

In 2009, the Pebble Beach Concours included classic motorcycles for the first time under the theme of pre-1959 British Motorcycles.

The Concours received the 2011 Motoring Event of the Year award by the International Historic Motoring Awards.

With the 2020 event being scrapped by the COVID-19 pandemic, the 70th was deferred to 2021.

Each year's Pebble Beach Concours honors a featured marque (manufacturer), coachbuilder, or type. Though the original European "Concours d'Elegance" events of the early 20th century focused on then-new cars and coachwork, the modern Concours show circuit focuses primarily on classic and vintage collector cars.

== The competitive field ==
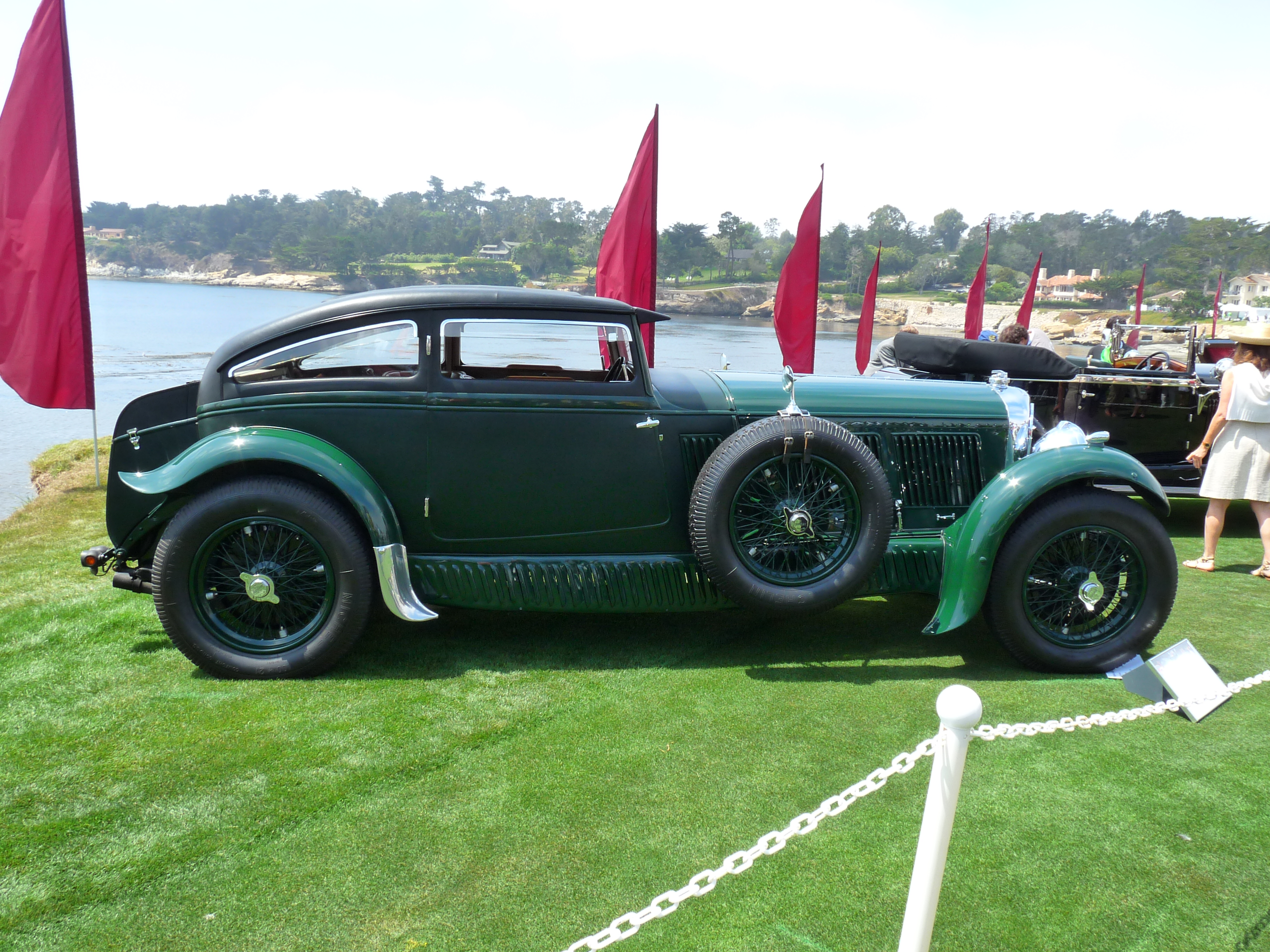
1930 Bentley Speed Six Nutting Coupe, 2009 Concours. This car once belonged to Woolf Barnato, Kimberley diamond heir and three-time winner of the 24 Hours of Le Mans race.

Prospective entrants must submit an application for each car, and the Concours field is selected from each year's pool of applicants. Many collectors spend years and hundreds of thousands of dollars purchasing and restoring a car in hopes of being chosen. Once a car is accepted to the Concours, it cannot again be entered in the event for ten years, with three exceptions; the ownership of the car has changed, the car has been restored, or if the featured marque is obscure, the Concours car selection committee can reach out to invite cars of varying restoration quality—or cars that have previously been entered in the Concours—in order to provide a healthy representation of the marque for exhibition.

Many of the competing cars are valued in the hundreds of thousands of dollars, and more recently into the millions of dollars. For this reason, along with its setting and amenities, the Pebble Beach Concours is considered the premier concours in the world, and is the centerpiece of over 50 related events spanning over a week, including vintage racing cars running at the Rolex Monterey Motorsports Reunion (formerly called the Monterey Historic Automobile Races) conducted at nearby WeatherTech Raceway Laguna Seca, as well as classic car auctions.

== Awards ==
=== Best of Show ===
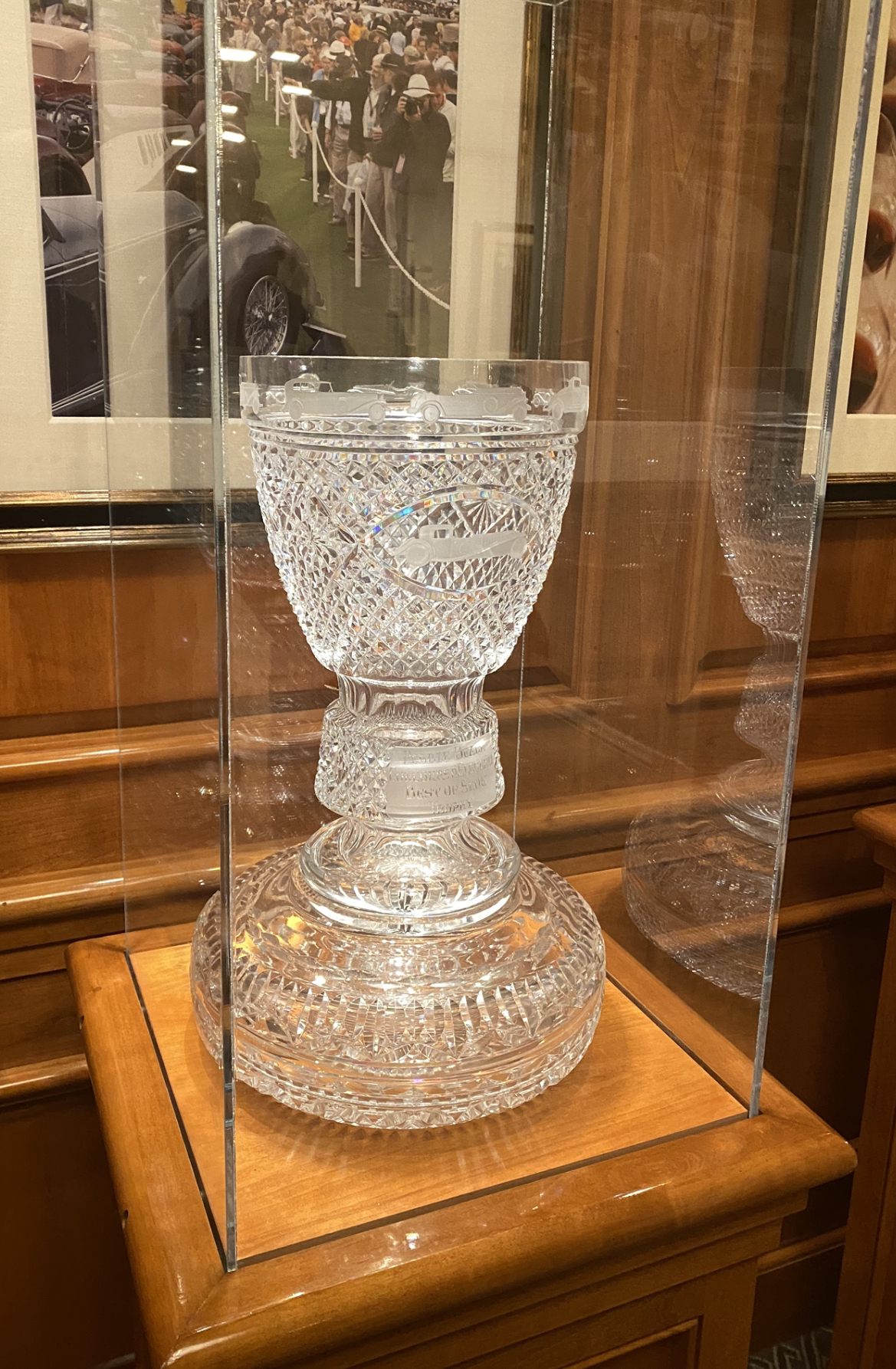
Best of Show trophy replica in 2023

The Best of Show award is the pinnacle accolade given to the overall winner of the Concours that is chosen from a selection of the three highest judged vehicles from the entire event. It is considered the most prestigious award achievable at any car show worldwide.

J.B. Nethercutt has the most Best of Show awards with 6 wins, while Bugatti and Mercedes-Benz are tied as the most successful marque with 10 wins each as of 2024.

=== Elegance Awards ===
- J.B. & Dorothy Nethercutt Most Elegant Closed Car
- Gwenn Graham Most Elegant Convertible
- Jules Heumann Most Elegant Open Car
- Strother MacMinn Most Elegant Sports Car

=== Other Awards ===
==== The Stanford Award ====
The Stanford University Center for Automotive Research at Stanford (CARS) and the Hasso Plattner Institute of Design (also known as the D.school) present the Award for Automotive Innovation to vehicles which have truly impacted the challenge of a sustainable future through excellence in technology and innovation. The judging team is composed of Stanford students who, in the quarter leading up to the Concours, enroll in a course to do a rigorous dive into the principles of design, innovation, and automobile engineering to create an evaluation rubric to judge vehicles.

During Monterey Car Week, students travel to Pebble Beach for their capstone project, using the rubric they created to evaluate a slate of vehicles and select the Award winner.

In 2023, the Stanford Award recipient was a 1928 Mercedes-Benz SSK 710 Sport Two-Seater, shown by John Houlihan of Ireland.

In 2024, the Stanford Award recipient was a 1934 Bugatti Type 59 Sports, shown by Fritz Burkard of Switzerland. The same Bugatti also took home Best of Show that year.

The course was launched and taught by Design thinking proponent David M. Kelley, the co-founder of IDEO and founder of the D.school.

==== Gran Turismo Award ====
Since 2008, Japanese-American Kazunori Yamauchi and the president of Polyphony Digital, creator of the Gran Turismo series, has presented the Gran Turismo Award to the participant vehicle that stands out as exemplary among the competition, whether it be due to rarity, quality of restoration, or stunning appearance. The owners of the winning vehicle are then offered the opportunity to have their car featured in the Gran Turismo series. Yamauchi is also an honorary judge for the main awards.

In 2021, the Gran Turismo Award went to a 1969 Ferrari 512 S Berlinetta once driven by Jacky Ickx and John Surtees owned by Swiss-based Frenchman Pierre Mellinger.

==== The French Cup ====
This award, established in the 1980s (unknown year), is given to, as the name says, a car of French origin considered the most significant. In 2021 the award went to a 1937 Delahaye 135 M Chapron Cabriolet owned by Tom McGough Sr. and Tom McGough Jr. of North Oaks, Minnesota.

== Concept cars ==
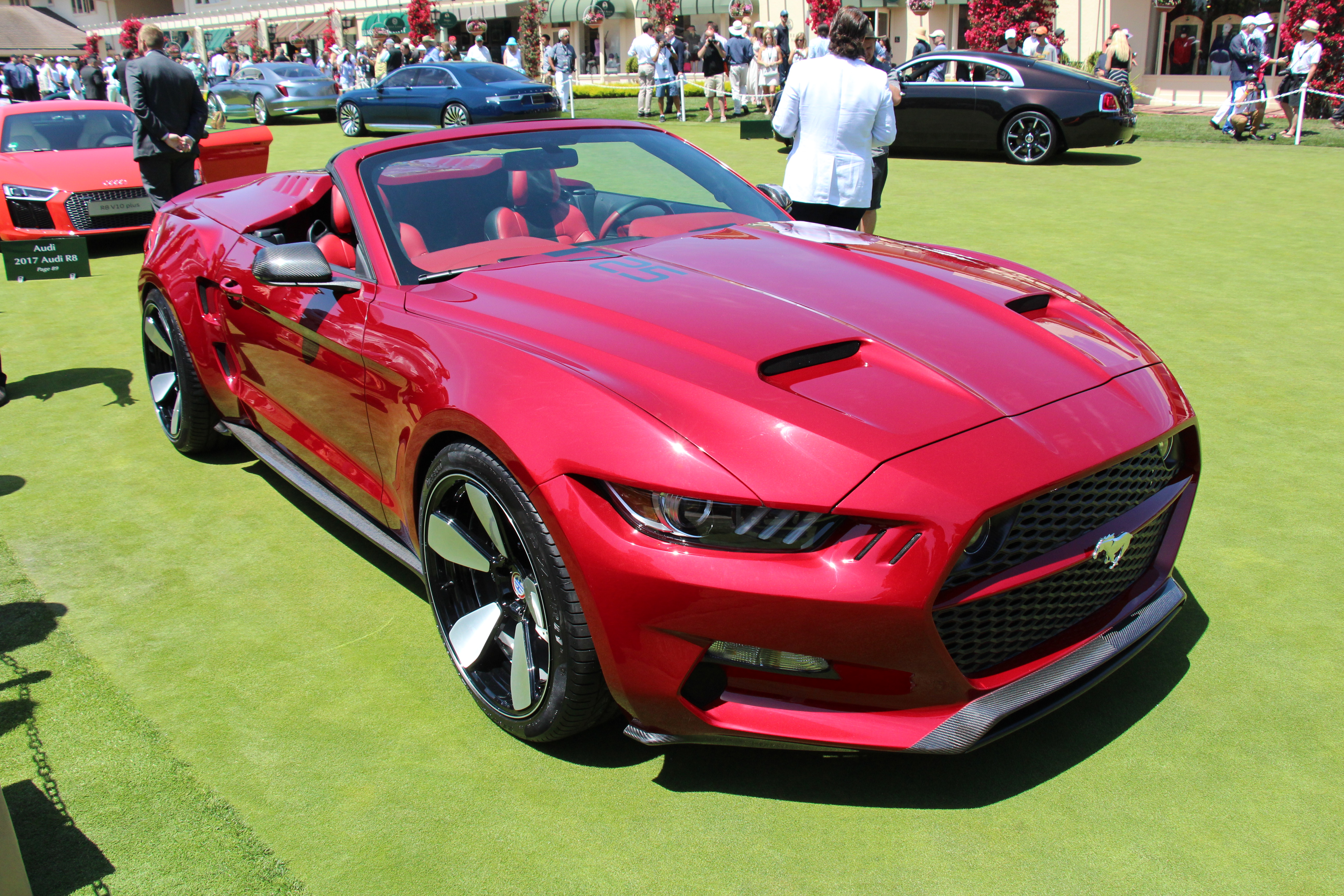
2015 Galpin Mustang Rocket Convertible Concept at the 2015 Pebble Beach Concours d'Elegance

Luxury and supercar brands use the event as an auto show, and officially debut their new models and concept cars. Many of the participating manufactures have their own corporate display building for the duration of the event.

Participating brands have included Aston Martin, Acura, Audi, Bentley, BMW, Bugatti, Cadillac, Corvette, Czinger, DeLorean, Ferrari, Ford, Hennessey, Koenigsegg, Lamborghini, Land Rover, Lexus, Lincoln, Lucid, Mercedes-Benz, McLaren, Pagani, Porsche, Rolls-Royce, SSC, and several others.

The Bugatti Veyron Grand Sport was revealed at the 2008 Pebble Beach Concours.

== Pebble Beach Auctions ==
The event hosts the Pebble Beach Auctions, which is an auto auction centered around high-end vehicles valued in the millions. In 2022 alone the auction's total sales accounted for US$469 million.

== Charitable performance ==
The proceeds of the Pebble Beach Concours d'Elegance have supported the United Way of Monterey County and the Pebble Beach Company Foundation for a combination of 56 years. It also supports a number of other local and national organizations.

The 2016 event raised over $1.75 million, and the Concours has given more than $23 million to charities through the years.
