= Canadian Pacific 2850 =

Preserved Canadian Pacific steam locomotive

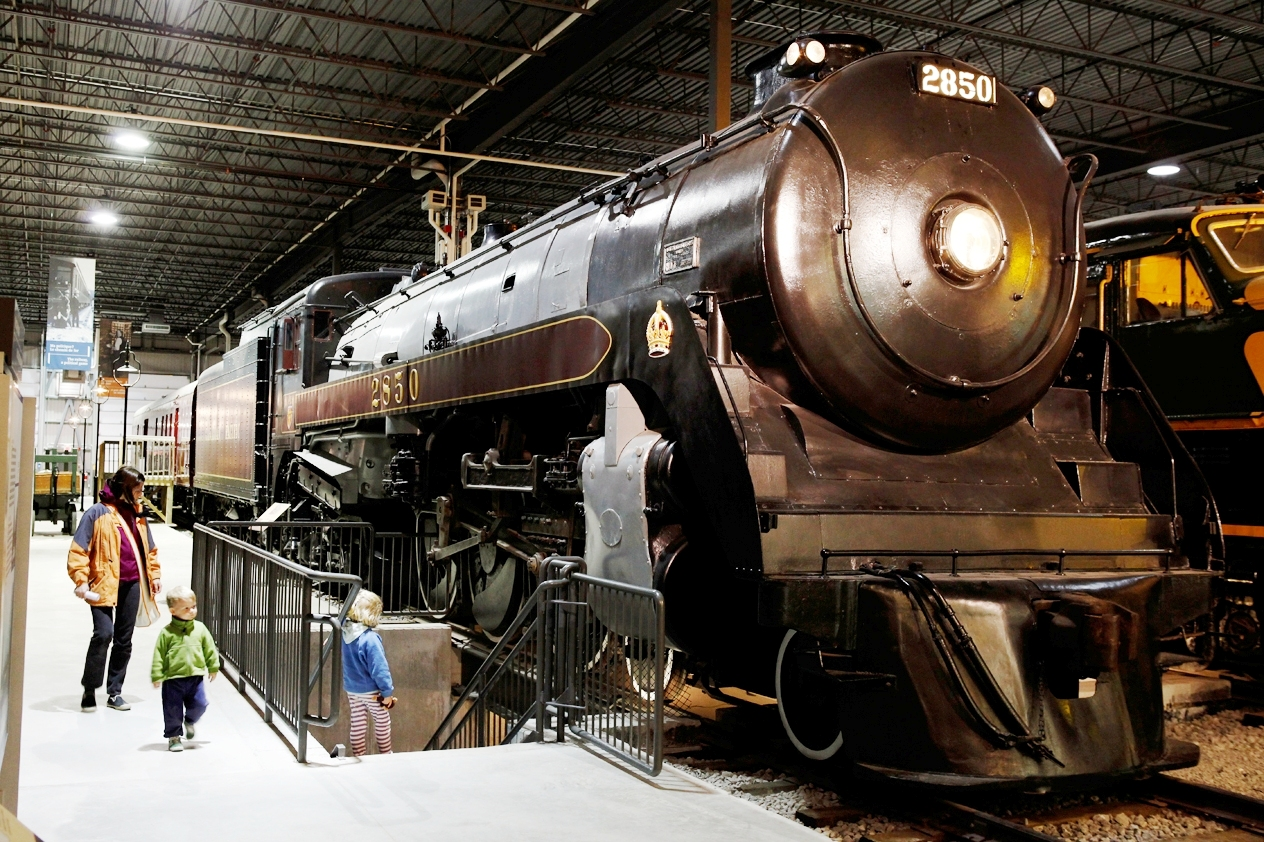
- No. 2850 on display at the Canadian Railway Museum in May 2009
Type and origin
- Power type: Steam
- Designer: Henry Blaine Bowen
- Builder: Montreal Locomotive Works
- Serial number: 69100
- Build date: August 1938
Specifications
- Configuration
  - Whyte: 4-6-4
  - UIC: 2′C2′ h2
- Gauge: 4 ft 8 1/2 in (1,435 mm)
- Driver dia.: 75 in (1.9 m)
- Adhesive weight: 186,800 lb (84.7 t)
- Loco weight: 354,000 lb (161 t)
- Fuel type: Coal
- Boiler pressure: 275 lbf/in^{2} (1.90 MPa)
- Cylinders: Two, outside
- Cylinder size: 22 in × 30 in (560 mm × 760 mm)
- Valve gear: Inverted Walschaerts
- Valve type: Piston valves
- Loco brake: Air
- Train brakes: Air
- Couplers: Knuckle
Performance figures
- Tractive effort: Engine: 45,254 lbf (201.3 kN), Booster: 12,000 lbf (53.4 kN), Total: 57,254 lbf (254.7 kN)
Career
- Operators: Canadian Pacific Railway
- Class: H1d
- Retired: 1959
- Preserved: 1960
- Disposition: On static display

Canadian Pacific 2850 is a preserved H1d class 4-6-4 Royal Hudson type steam locomotive, built by the Montreal Locomotive Works in August 1938 for the Canadian Pacific Railway. It is known for hauling the 1939 Royal Train across Canada with King George VI and Queen Elizabeth, later earning its class the official title of Royal Hudson.

The locomotive was withdrawn from service in 1959 and acquired by the Canadian Railroad Historical Association in 1960 for preservation at the Canadian Railway Museum, where it currently remains on static display.

== History ==
=== Revenue service ===
No. 2850 was built in August 1938 by the Montreal Locomotive Works as an H1d class locomotive. Unlike the earlier H1a and H1b classes, the H1c, H1d, and H1e locomotives were semi-streamlined and had improved aerodynamics. The Canadian Pacific Railway ordered 45 of these modern Hudsons between 1937 and 1940 for passenger and freight service across the country, with the H1d's assigned to Eastern Canada.

=== Royal connection ===
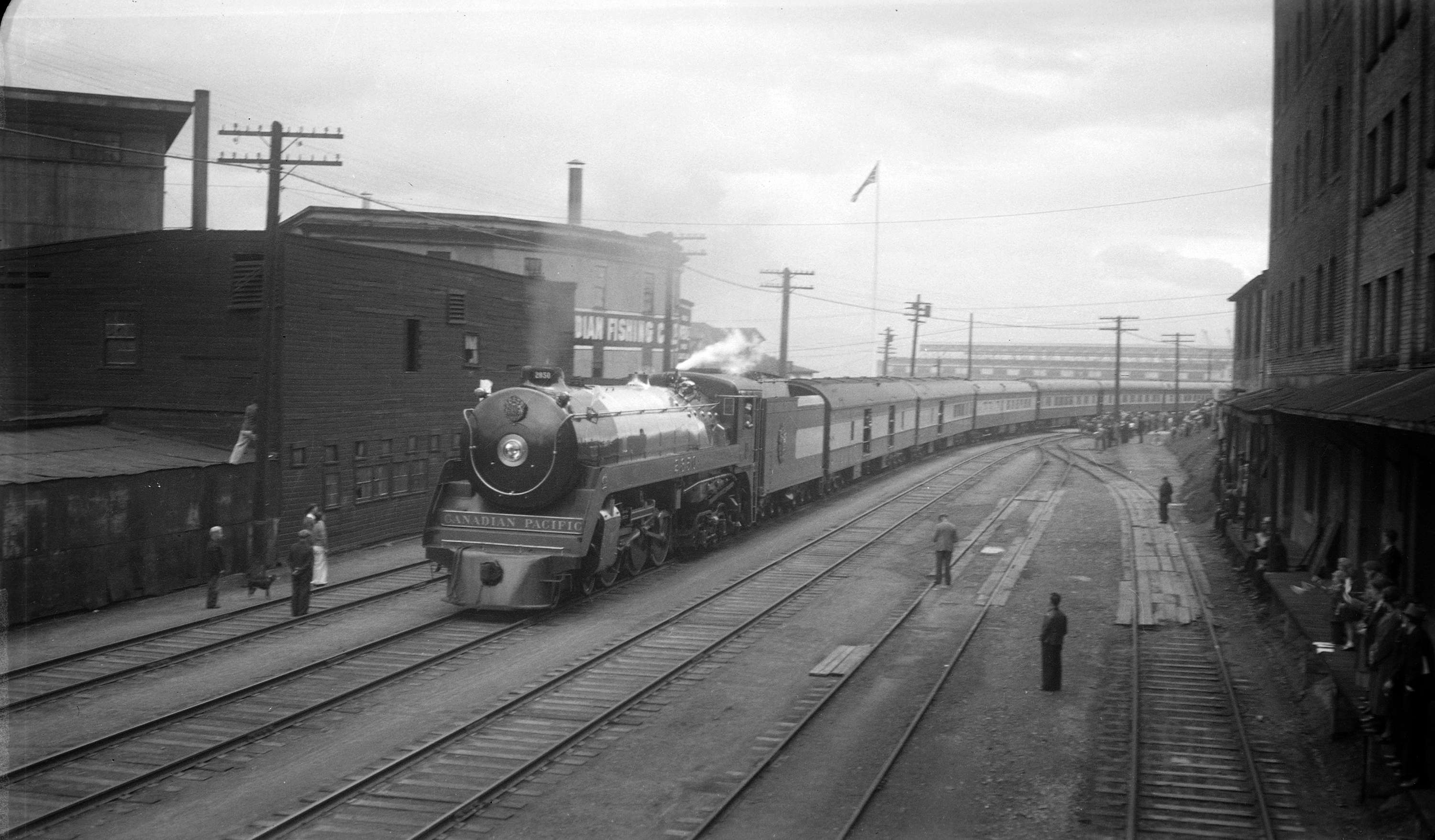
Canadian Pacific No. 2850 arriving in Vancouver carrying King George VI and Queen Elizabeth on the Royal Train on May 29, 1939.

In 1939, King George VI and Queen Elizabeth toured Canada, marking the first time a reigning monarch visited North America. A Royal Train was chosen as means of transportation, and the Canadian Pacific Railway was privileged with hosting its westward run, whilst Canadian National Railway later hauled the train eastward. No. 2850 was ten months old and one of the railway's newest engines when the CPR selected it for the Royal Train.

The locomotive was sent to the Canadian Pacific Angus Shops in Montreal for an extensive refurbishment prior to its run. No. 2850 was fitted with a stainless steel boiler jacket, cylinders, and handrails, and royal crowns were adorned on its smokebox, running board skirts, and tender. Brass numbers were also cast in relief and mounted on its sides. The locomotive and its coaches were finished in a royal blue, gold, and silver livery.

No. 2850 left the Angus Shops at 9:05 PM on May 8, 1939, and with its twelve cars it made an overnight test trip from Montreal to Smiths Falls. The King and Queen arrived at Wolfe's Cove, Quebec on May 17, where they spent the night at the Citadelle of Quebec. The following morning on May 18, the Royal Train departed Quebec City at 8:30 AM, briefly stopping at Trois-Rivières to pick up officials, then bound for Montreal where it stopped for dinner. It left at 10:00 PM for Ottawa, where it spent the next two days. The Royal Train then travelled across the country, touring major cities including Toronto, Winnipeg, Regina, Calgary, and Kamloops. The King was impressed with the locomotive's performance and rode in the cab when possible, while the Queen noted "It is a lovely engine." No. 2850 completed its 3,224-mile, transcontinental run on May 29 after arriving in Vancouver, where the King and Queen boarded a Canadian Pacific ferry to Victoria that evening. The locomotive was displayed in its royal blue livery at the 1939 New York World's Fair later in the summer, later returning for service between Fort William and Winnipeg. It was repainted in its standard maroon livery, albeit the stainless steel components remained.

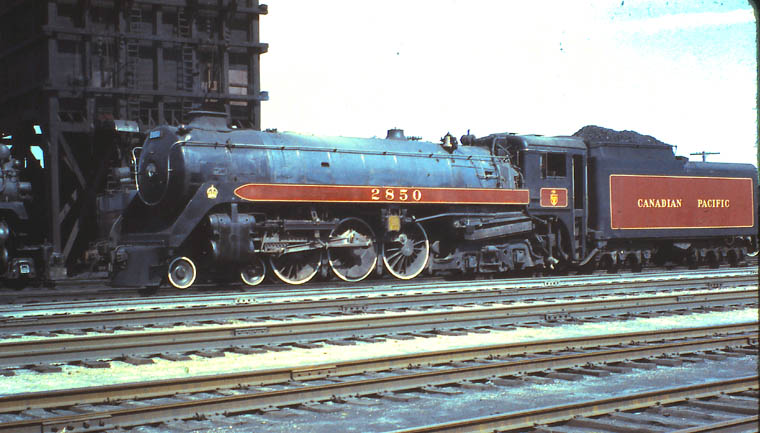
No. 2850 repainted in the standard maroon livery and in regular service in Winnipeg on August 24, 1957.

After the tour, Henry Blaine Bowen, the Canadian Pacific's Chief of Motive Power and Rolling Stock and the designer of the locomotive, requested that the series of semi-streamlined Hudsons be classified as "Royal" and have royal crowns fixed on their running boards. Their Majesties promptly approved, and the class became known as the Royal Hudsons, making this the only time a locomotive was given royal designation by the reigning monarch.

=== Preservation ===
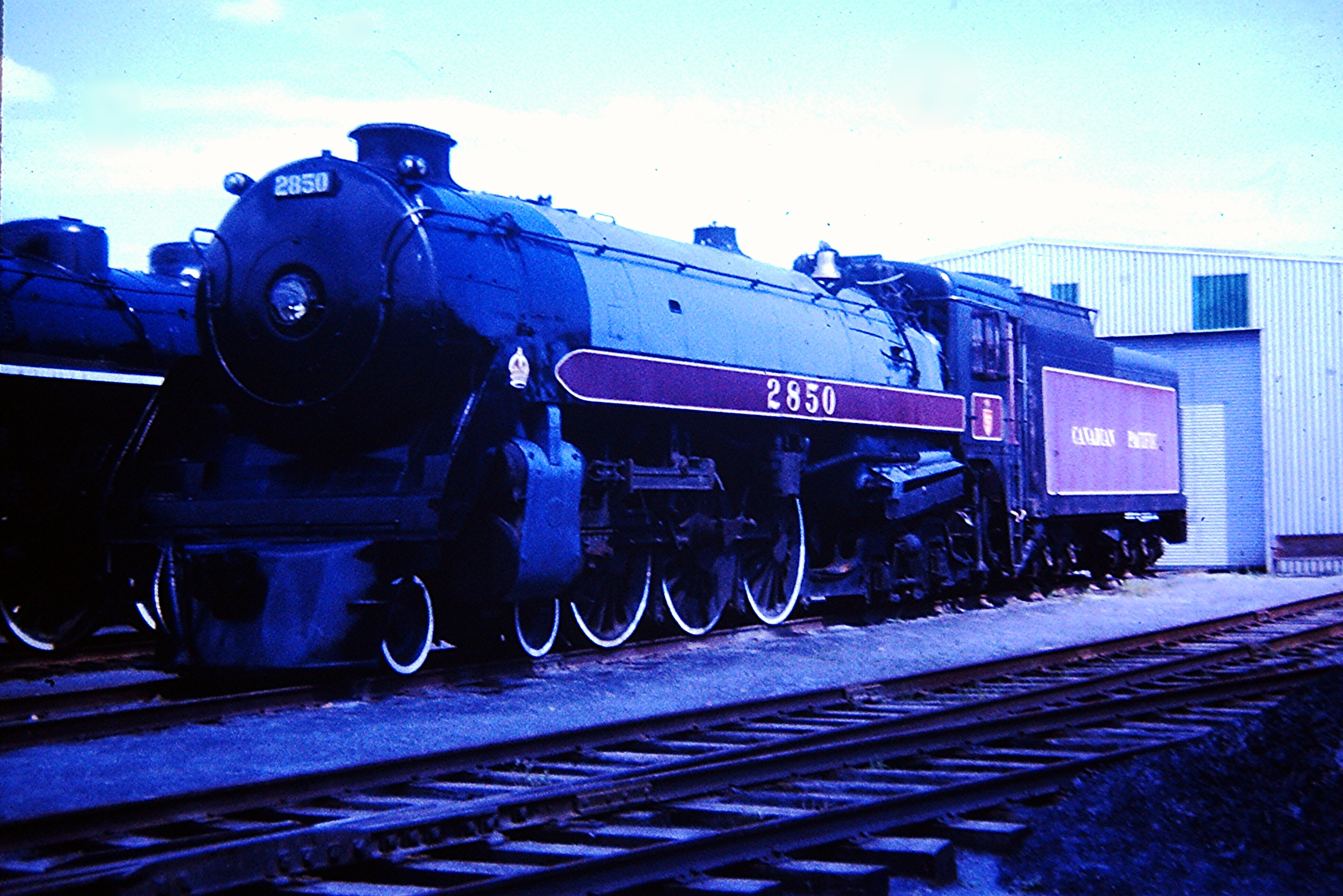
No. 2850 on static display at the Canadian Railway Museum in August 1970.

No. 2850 was retired in 1959 and was purchased by the Canadian Railroad Historical Association in 1960. Initial plans were for the locomotive to be restored in its Royal Train livery, however this never succeeded.

In May 2003, No. 2850 was moved inside the newly-built Angus Pavilion for static display indoors.

== See also ==
- Canadian Pacific Royal Hudson
- Canadian Pacific Railway § Steam locomotives
- 1939 royal tour of Canada
