= Nethercutt Collection =

Private car collection in Los Angeles, California

The Nethercutt Collection
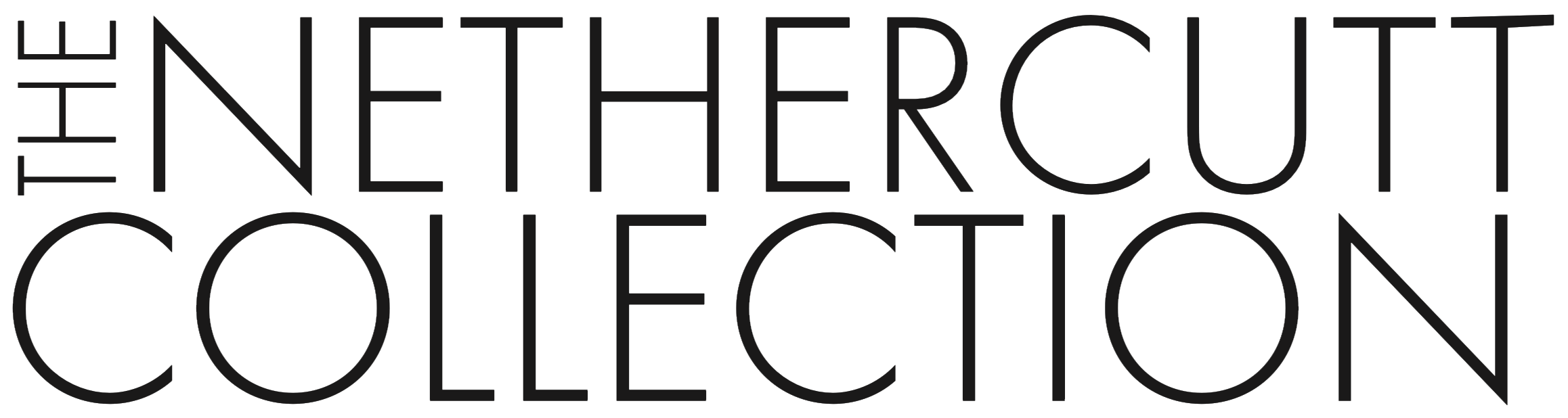

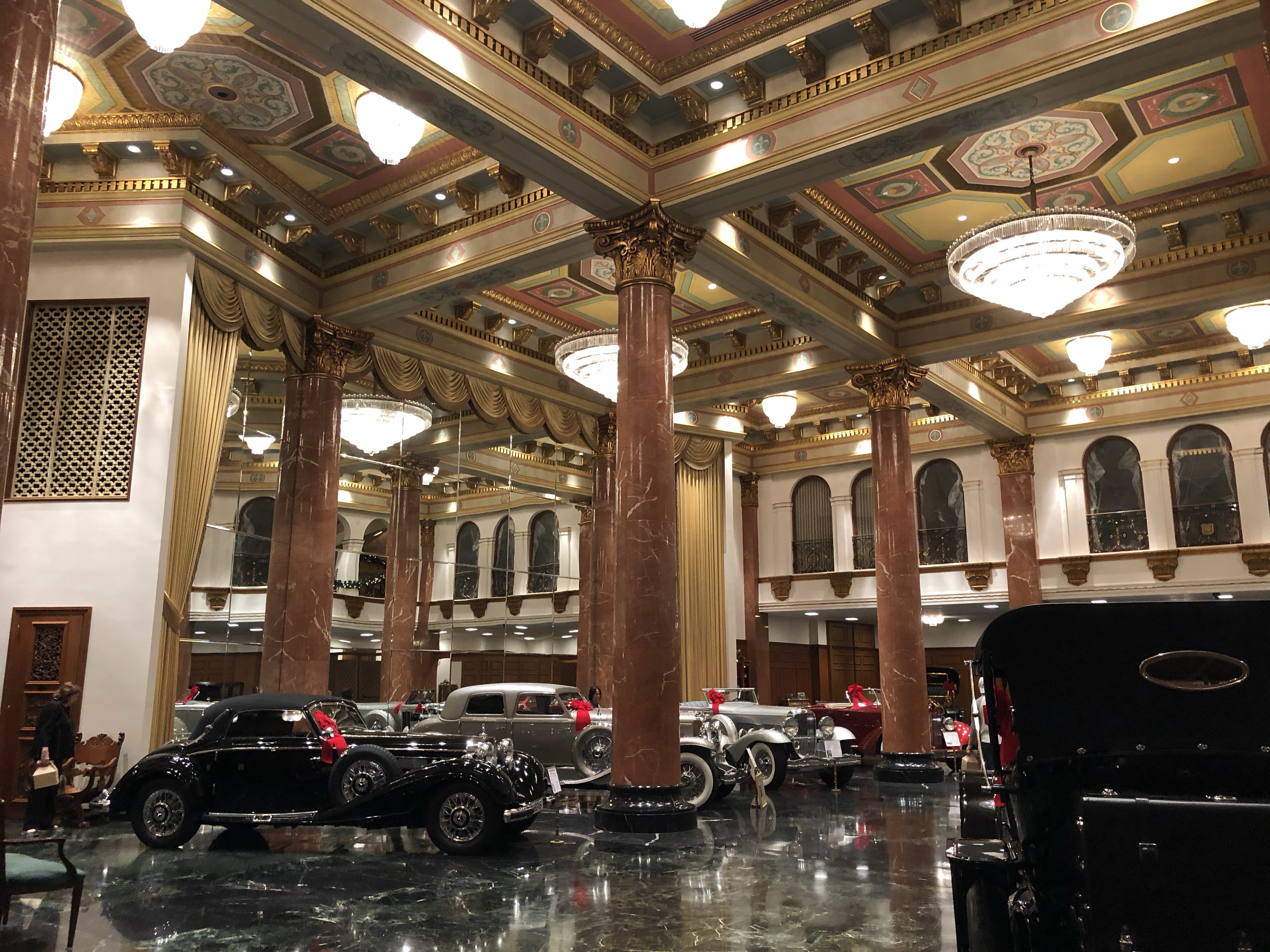
- Grand Salon of the Collection

- Location within the Los Angeles metropolitan area
- Established: 1971; 55 years ago
- Location: Sylmar, California, U.S.
- Coordinates: 34.30667°N 118.46361°W
- Type: Automotive museum Music museum
- Collection size: 250+ automobiles
- Founder: J.B. Nethercutt
- Curator: Cameron Richards
- Owner: Nethercutt–Richards family
- Website: www.nethercuttcollection.org

The Nethercutt Collection is a museum and car collection complex located in Sylmar, California. It was founded by J.B. Nethercutt in 1971 and its centerpiece is the prestigious automobile collection of the Nethercutt–Richards family that contains over 250 cars, nearly all of which J.B. originally collected and owned. It is widely regarded as one of the greatest car museums in the world.^{§}

Built in 1971 adjacent to a Merle Norman Cosmetics facility, the San Sylmar penthouse tower was one of J.B. Nethercutt's private estates and was primarily used to house his growing prestigious car collection, serving dual purpose of a museum when he wasn't present. Until the 1994 Northridge earthquake, San Sylmar was one of the largest houses in the United States at 60,000 square feet (5,600 m^{2}). In 2000, the collection expanded with The Nethercutt Museum, a 40,000 square feet (3,700 m^{2}) self-guided museum building.

The museum also houses collections of mechanical musical instruments, including orchestrions, player pianos, music boxes, antique furniture, watches, and an automotive research library. Another rare piece in the collection is the Canadian Pacific Railway's famous Royal Hudson steam locomotive Canadian Pacific 2839 built in 1937. The semi-streamlined Royal Hudson steam locomotive is one of four that survive today.

The Nethercutt Collection is known for its performance in Concours d'Elegance competitions and car shows with its restoration and detailing shop, holding the most Concours titles of any competitor worldwide including a record six Best of Show victories at Pebble Beach.

== History ==
In 1956 J.B. Nethercutt (1913–2004), the co-founder of Merle Norman Cosmetics, purchased two cars: a 1936 Duesenberg Convertible Roadster and a 1930 DuPont Town Car, needing refurbishing. The DuPont restoration, which Nethercutt thought would take a few weeks, instead took 18 months and over $65,000. By 1958, his rebuilt project claimed its first prize; the coveted “Best of Show” award at the prestigious Pebble Beach Concours d'Elegance. Over the next decade he would purchase several other antique automobiles and restore them.

=== San Sylmar estate ===
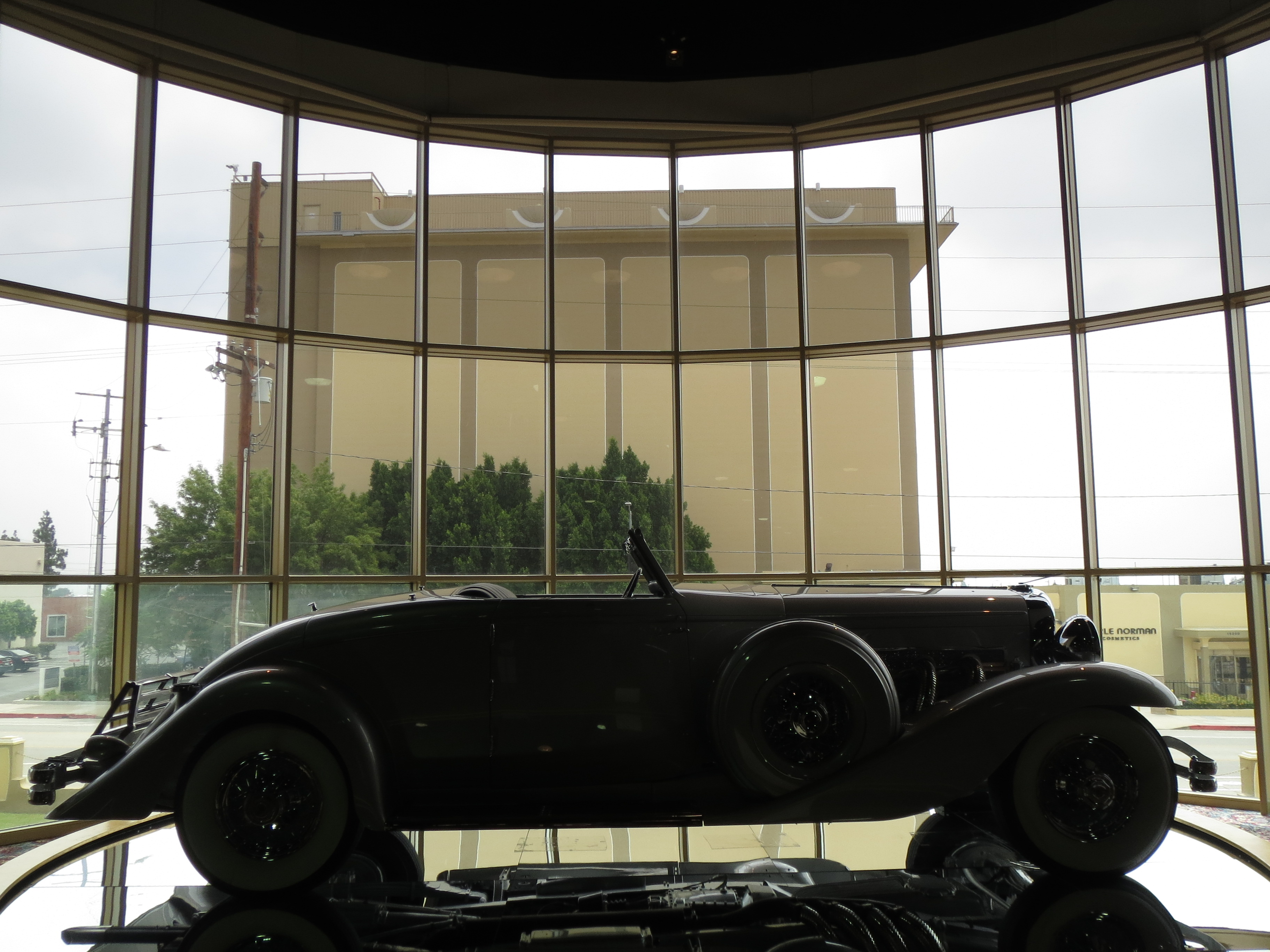
Post-earthquake San Sylmar tower viewed from the museum display in 2015

In the late 1960s Nethercutt ascended to CEO and Chairman of Merle Norman Cosmetics and purchased several acres of land in Sylmar, Los Angeles to develop a warehouse for his growing car collection and connect it to a new Merle Norman manufacturing plant. Instead of a warehouse, he decided to develop a personal six floor, ten-story-tall Art Deco penthouse palace that will serve dual-purpose as a free of charge museum when he was not living there, and in 1971 the San Sylmar tower estate was constructed.

The first two stories of the tower; the Lower and Grand Salon showrooms, featured most of J.B.'s vehicle collections, with a closed off 30,000 square-foot car workshop being connected to the Lower Salon. The Grand Salon features the most expensive vehicles and was architecturally inspired by a mix of 1920s-30s New York City luxury car showrooms, grand ballrooms and opulent theatres which extends partially into the third story. The third story features an awards room, a vast collection of hood ornaments, and a cafeteria for the collection's employees. The fourth story consists of a 10,000 square foot music room with several large antique music boxes and player pianos, with a massive Wurlitzer theatre organ in the centerpiece of the room.

The fourth floor also features a Louis XV style dining room and a large private kitchen that J.B. used for private dinners with French personal chef Yvon Hunckler, who previously cooked for The Beverly Hills Hotel, Grand Hotel Birmingham, and Hôtel de Paris in Monaco. Yvon would author a series of luxury cookbooks titled Dining at San Sylmar.

The fifth floor has a theatre which includes a 24 karat gold proscenium arch next to a massive storage room of pianos and musical records. There was a sixth floor private penthouse that included a full balcony which J.B. used as his secondary residence that was closed off from tours. The penthouse included a rotating Rococo-style bedroom. The 1994 Northridge earthquake structurally damaged the sixth floor penthouse which led to the floor's deconstruction, which is now an empty open-air floor surrounded by a steel wall.

The San Sylmar estate was one of the largest houses in the United States at 60,000 square feet (5,600 m^{2}) and the entire Nethercutt Collection as a whole was 90,000 sq ft (8,400 m^{2}) with the workshops.

=== Museum expansion ===
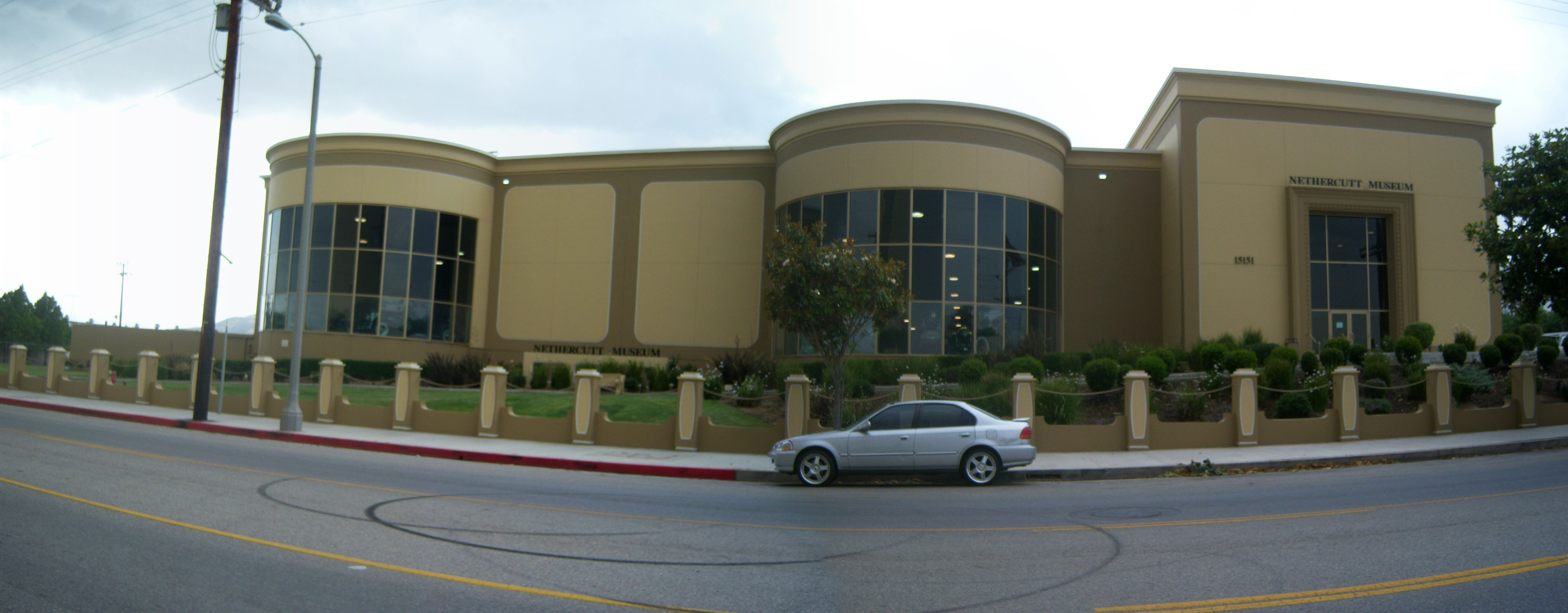
Museum expansion building

In 2000 the Collection expanded and constructed a new 40,000 square foot display building directly across the street which was separately called the Nethercutt Museum. In comparison with the Collection which requires reserved guided tours, the newer Nethercutt Museum is openly self-guided. The building also contains the Nethercutt Automotive Research Library and Archive, which is considered one of the greatest in the world. Outside of the Museum are a CPR steam locomotive Royal Hudson No. 2839 and a 1912 Pullman private car.

After J.B. Nethercutt's death in 2004, the collection was handed down to Jack Nethercutt II and Helen Richards-Nethercutt. The collection had a budget of around $2.5 million a year. In 2011 OPI Products and Merle Norman Cosmetics styled its "Hussy" perfume and lipstick line after the Collection's distinctively red "Hussy" 1934 Packard LeBaron Sport Phaeton, which is nicknamed after John Hussey.

The collection was closed from 2020 to 2021 due to the COVID-19 pandemic. In 2020, the original 50-acre Merle Norman Cosmetics production facility that was adjacent to the collection was sold and demolished, which is now the site of Sylmar Studios. In 2022 the museum underwent major cosmetic renovations, including a new logo. In 2023, Cameron Richards, the grandson of Jack Nethercutt and great-grandson of J.B. Nethercutt, became vice president and curator of the museum.

== Vehicles ==
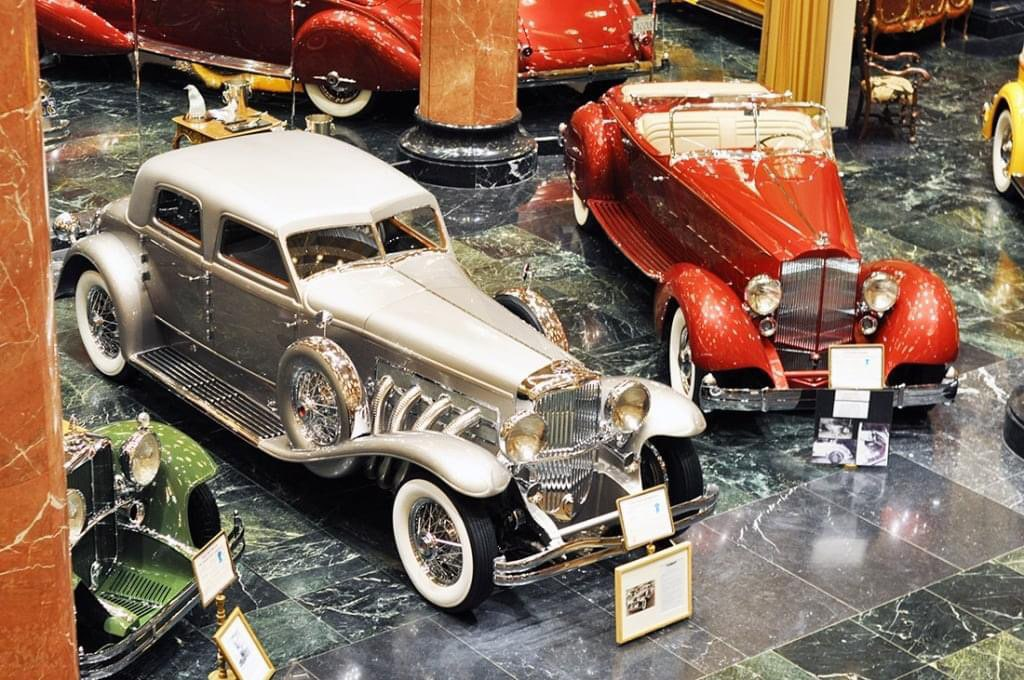
Duesenberg Twenty Grand and Packard "Hussy"

=== Cars ===
The Nethercutt Collection has over 250 prestigious, antique, and exotic vehicles from American and European origin, notably including from Aston Martin, Austin-Healey, Bentley, Bugatti, Cadillac, Duesenberg, Ferrari, Lincoln, Maybach, Mercedes-Benz, Porsche, Rolls-Royce and others. Several vehicles in the Collection were formerly owned by politicians and celebrities such as Abdullah Al-Salim Al-Sabah, Marjorie Merriweather Post, Fatty Arbuckle, Tim Allen, Constance Bennett, and others. The vehicles in the collection's Grand Salon showroom alone are worth over US$100 million.

==== Notable individual cars ====
- Duesenberg Twenty Grand - One-off Duesenberg Model SJ Arlington Torpedo Rollston sedan which was made for the "Dream Car" exhibition at the 1933 Chicago World's Fair. Its design by Gordon Buehrig is considered to be the most beautiful Duesenberg ever built and it is potentially the most valuable American car ever made.
- Bugatti Type 51 Dubos - Former Bugatti Type 51 race car driven by Louis Chiron that was modified to be a custom road coupe by Louis Dubos. It is considered one of the most beautiful cars in history, and is one of the most valuable cars in the world.

=== Locomotive ===
The Collection acquired Canadian Pacific Railway's famous Royal Hudson steam locomotive Canadian Pacific No. 2839 which was built in 1937, it is displayed with a fully restored 1912 Pullman private sleeping car outside of the museum complex. No. 2839 steam locomotive is one of four that survive today.

== Car restoration ==
The Nethercutt's 30,000 square-foot auto restoration and detailing complex is credited with being one of the finest in the world, with nearly all of the vehicles on display being in pristine condition and fully drivable. Many of the vehicles undergo several re-restorations to stay competitive for Concours d'Elegances and car shows.

== Concours d'Elegance ==
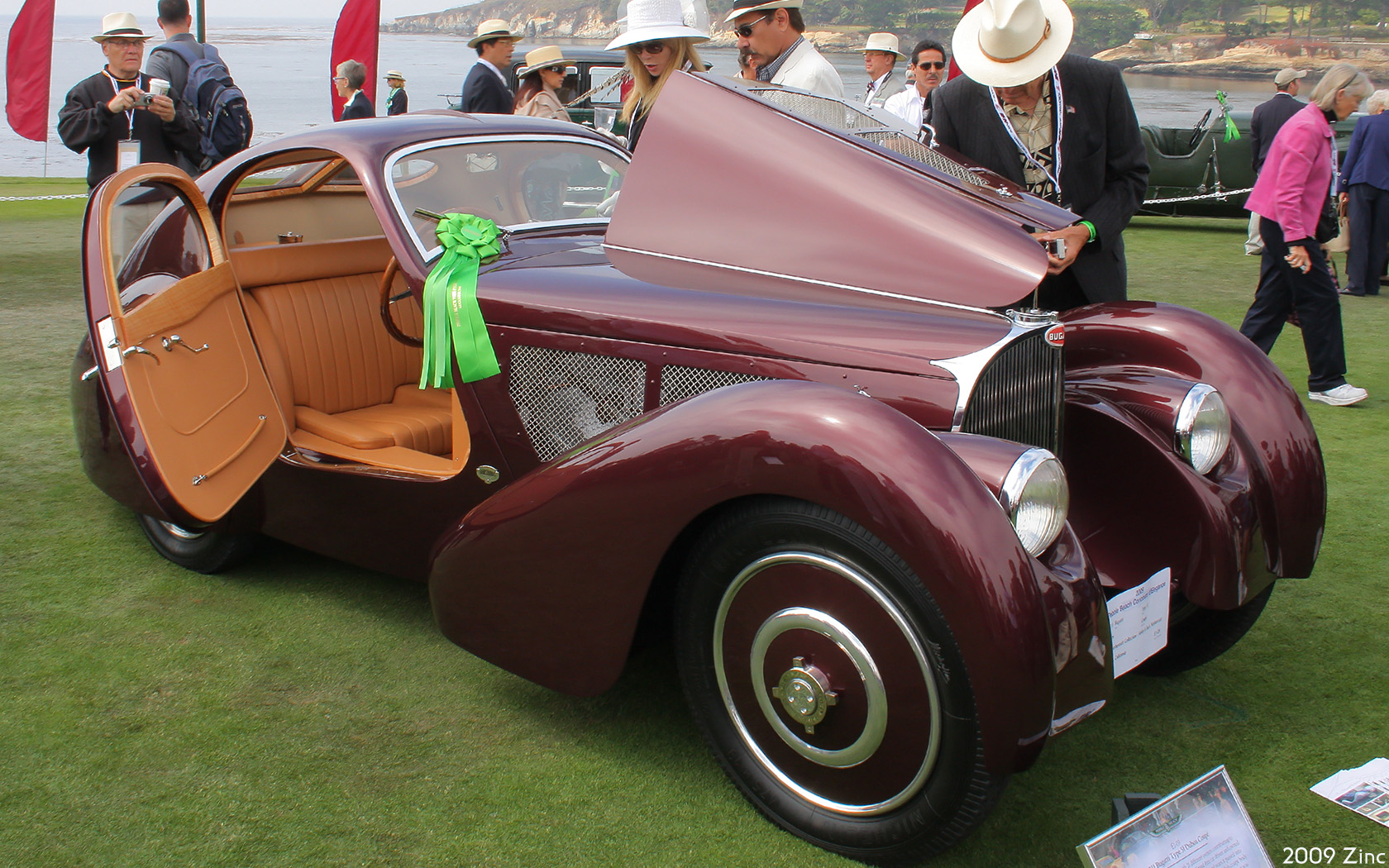
Nethercutt's Bugatti Type 51 Dubos at the 2009 Pebble Beach Concours d'Elegance

The Nethercutt Collection team competes in Concours d'Elegance competitions and car shows. The Collection has the most Best of Show titles of any competitor in the world, including a record six Best of Show titles at the pinnacle Pebble Beach and five at Amelia Island, both more than any other competitor.

=== Best of Show titles ===
Below is a list of known notable Best of Show titles:

- Pebble Beach (6): 1958, 1959, 1969, 1970, 1980, 1992
- Amelia Island (5): 2005, 2007, 2011, 2013, 2016
- Palos Verdes (3): 2007, 2009, 2012
- Las Vegas (2): 2019, 2022, 2026
- Rodeo Drive (2): 2023, 2026
- Kirkland (1): 2007
- Dana Point (1): 2011
- La Jolla (1): 2022

== Music ==
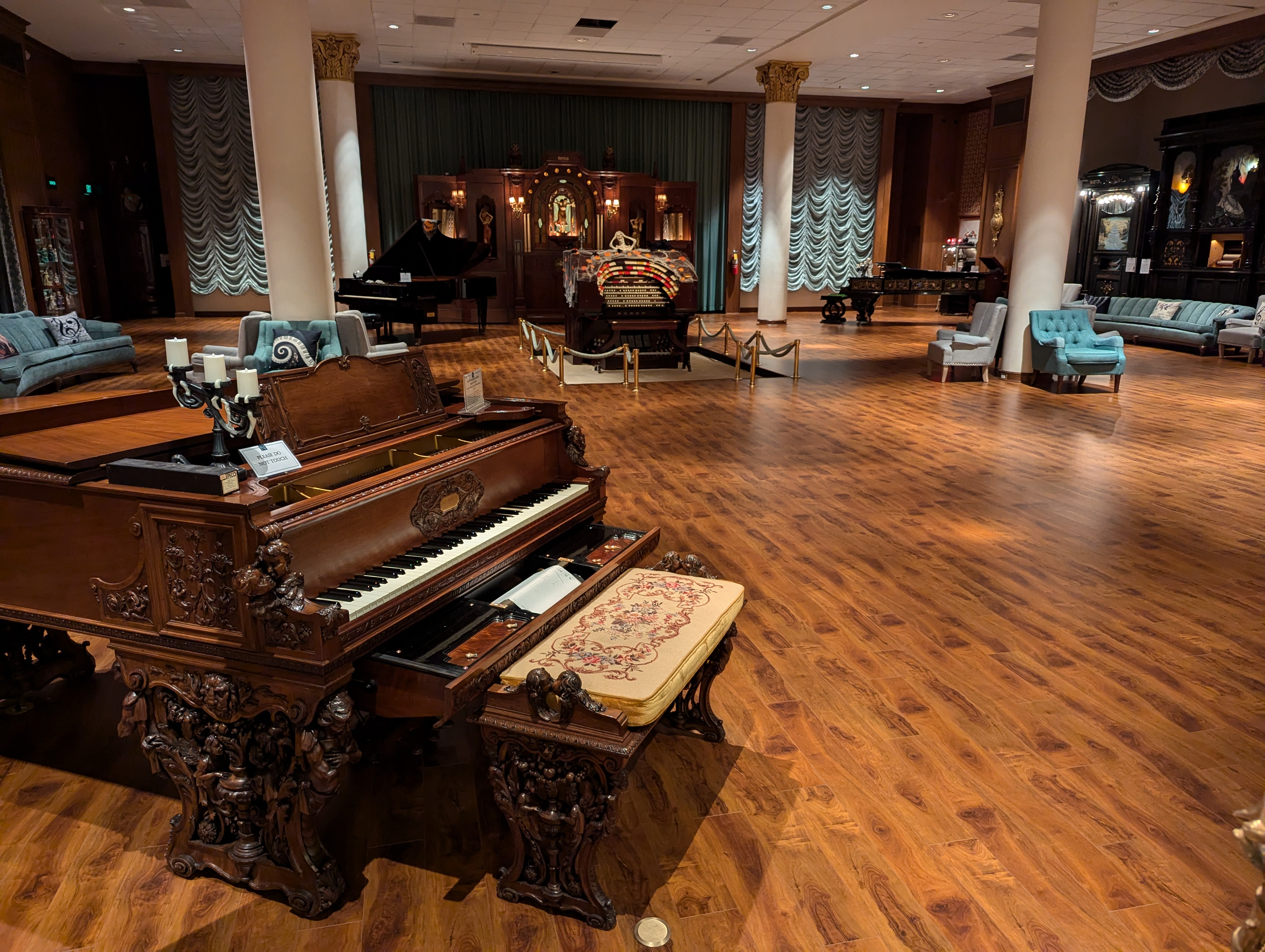
Nethercutt's 4th floor music room with the Mighty Wurlitzer pipe organ and player pianos

The Collection houses dozens of world-class antique music sets, including mechanical musical instruments, phonographs, massive orchestrions, dozens of player pianos and music boxes, and antique furniture primarily on its 4th floor.

The Nethercutt Collection's Wurlitzer theatre pipe organ is the largest theatre organ in the western United States and third largest in the world.

== Nethercutt Automotive Research Library ==
The museum wing contains the Nethercutt Automotive Research Library which contains archived encyclopedic engineering materials on American and European vehicles since the end of the 19th century, such as owner's manuals and engineering documents.

It is considered one of the ten greatest automotive research libraries in the world.

== Events ==
The Collection hosts silent film screenings and organ concerts in the fourth floor music room, using the Wurlitzer theatre pipe organ.

From 2008 to 2010 the Collection's vehicles served as the lead car and transport of the Grand Marshals of the Rose Parade, including Emeril Lagasse, Cloris Leachman, and Chesley Sullenberger.

=== Picnic tour ===
Every year until his death in 2004, J.B. Nethercutt would take dozens of cars from the Collection with his family, friends, and invited guests on a parade-like cruise through the hills to a picnic at Frazier Park with catered foods from the professional chefs at the Collection. The event was one of the most exclusive items on any car lovers wish list as Autoweek magazine described it, "You can be as rich as Bill Gates or have a collection as big as that of the Sultan of Brunei, but you don't get a personal invitation from J.B. Nethercutt himself." The vehicle insurance of each picnic was stated to be in the multi-millions.

== Recognition ==
The Collection has been named as one of the greatest car collections in the world by The New York Times, Los Angeles Times, Motor Trend, CNET, CBS, and several other publications. It is listed as one of America's five greatest automobile museums by Autoweek. It is one of the most valuable car collections in the world.

Automotive historian Jay Leno described the Collection as a "Smithsonian-style effort on the history of transportation in America" and "The hall of fame for cars.”

== In mass media ==
=== Film ===
The Royal Hudson steam locomotive No. 2839 appeared in the 1980 Coal Miner's Daughter film, which won an Academy Award. The 1949 film The Great Gatsby featured the 1936 Duesenberg SJN now owned by the collection.

=== Television ===
In 1999, the museum was featured in an episode of the PBS program Visiting With Huell Howser. In 2005 the collection was exclusively featured on the Motor Trend series My Classic Car. In September 2024, the museum and its cars were the focus of a segment on the CBS Evening News, which the Duesenberg Twenty Grand became the most valuable car to ever go in a fast food drive-through. In 2025, the Nethercutt Collection was featured in the first two pilot episodes of the Stop The Car museum hunting series, hosted by actor Doug Jones.

Starting in 2022, several of the collection's vehicles have been featured on the CNBC and YouTube series Jay Leno's Garage; including the Bugatti Dubos, 1933 Hispano-Suiza J12, 1930 Cadillac V-16, 1928 Isotta Fraschini Landaulet Type 8A, 1967 Ferrari 365 California Spyder, the Duesenberg Twenty Grand, and 1923 McFarlan Knickerbocker Cabriolet Model 154.

== Gallery ==
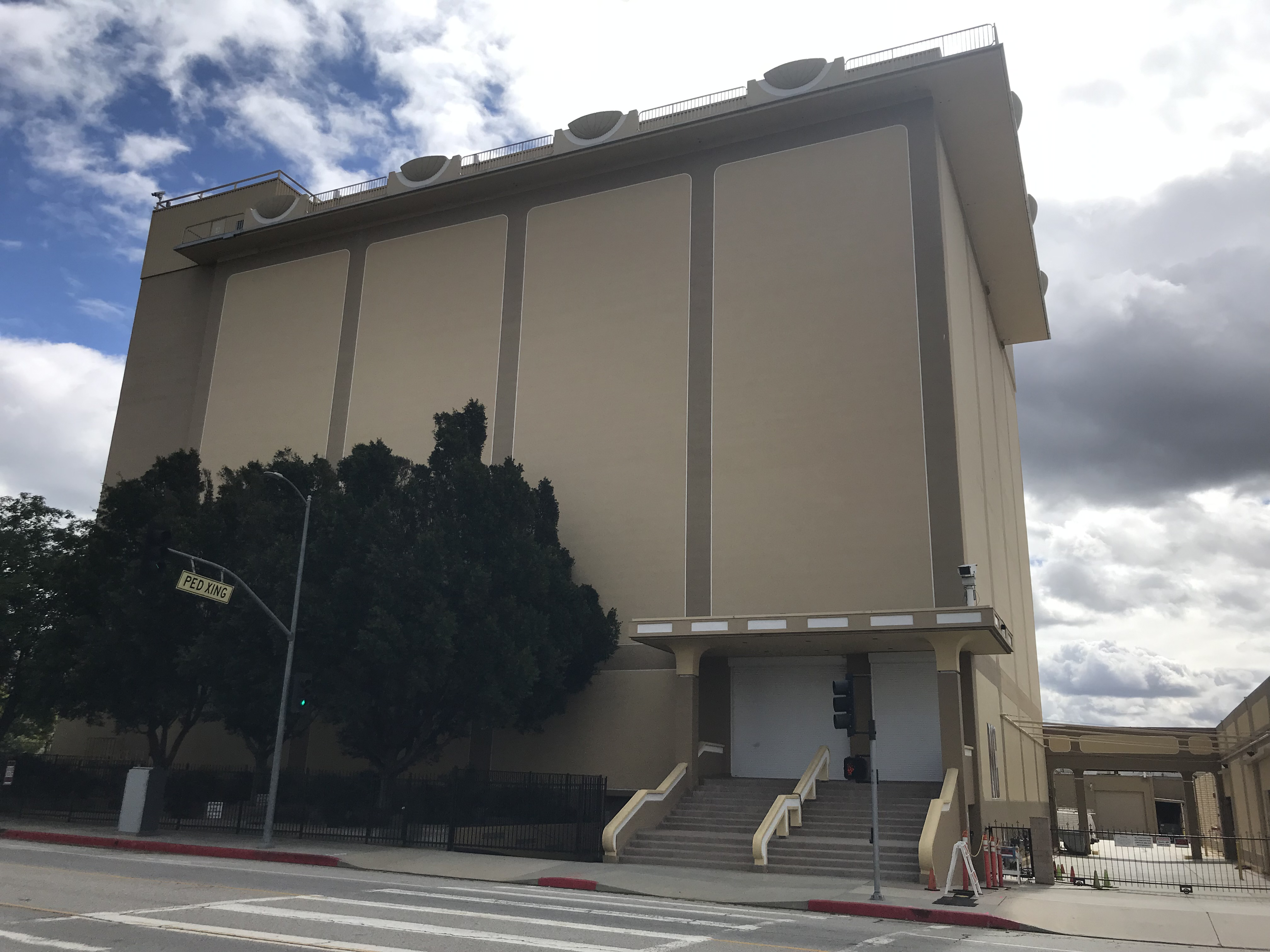
San Sylmar tower

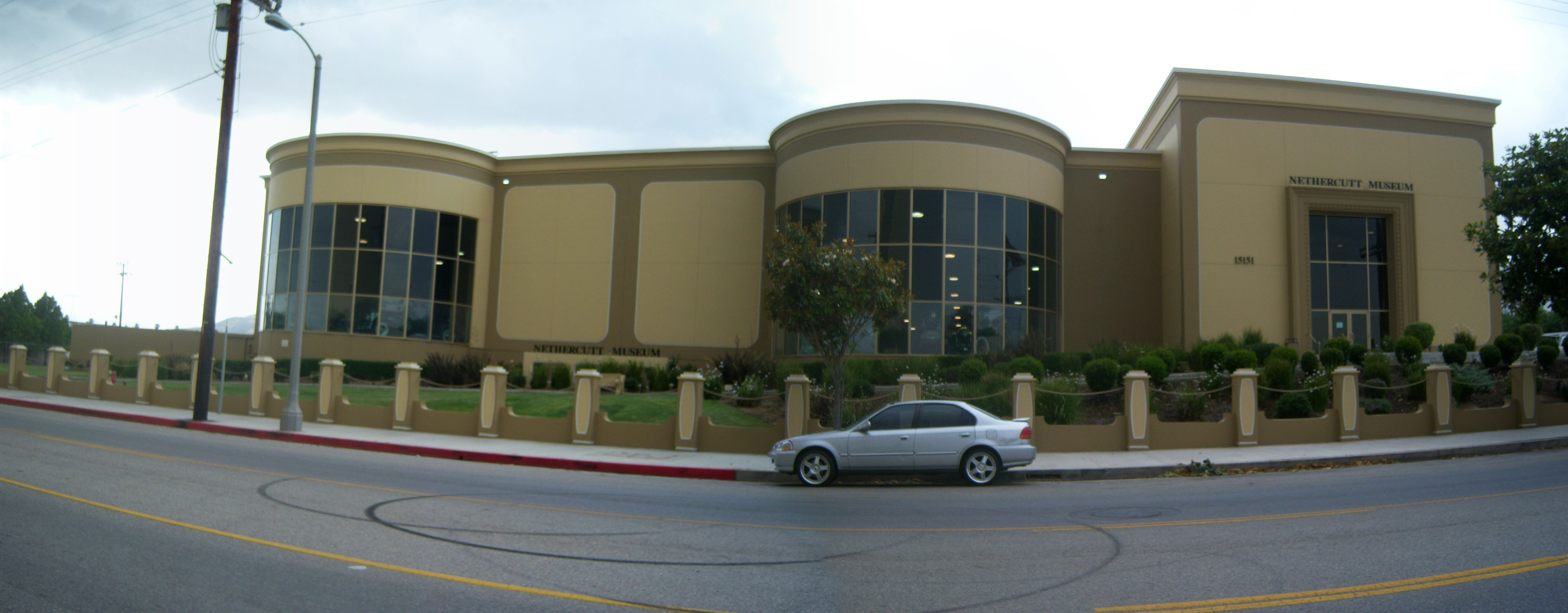
Museum display

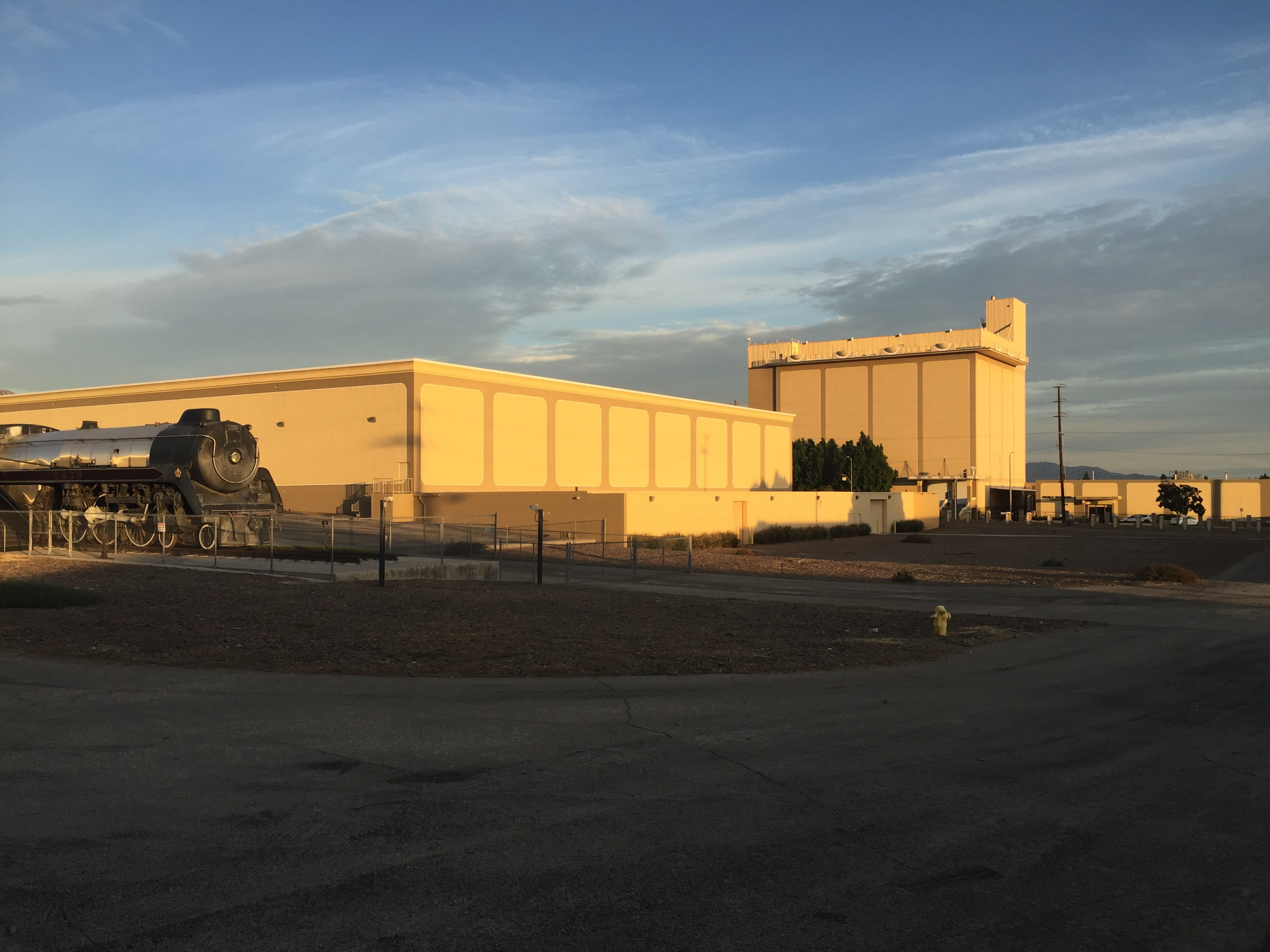
Back view of the museum and collection complex

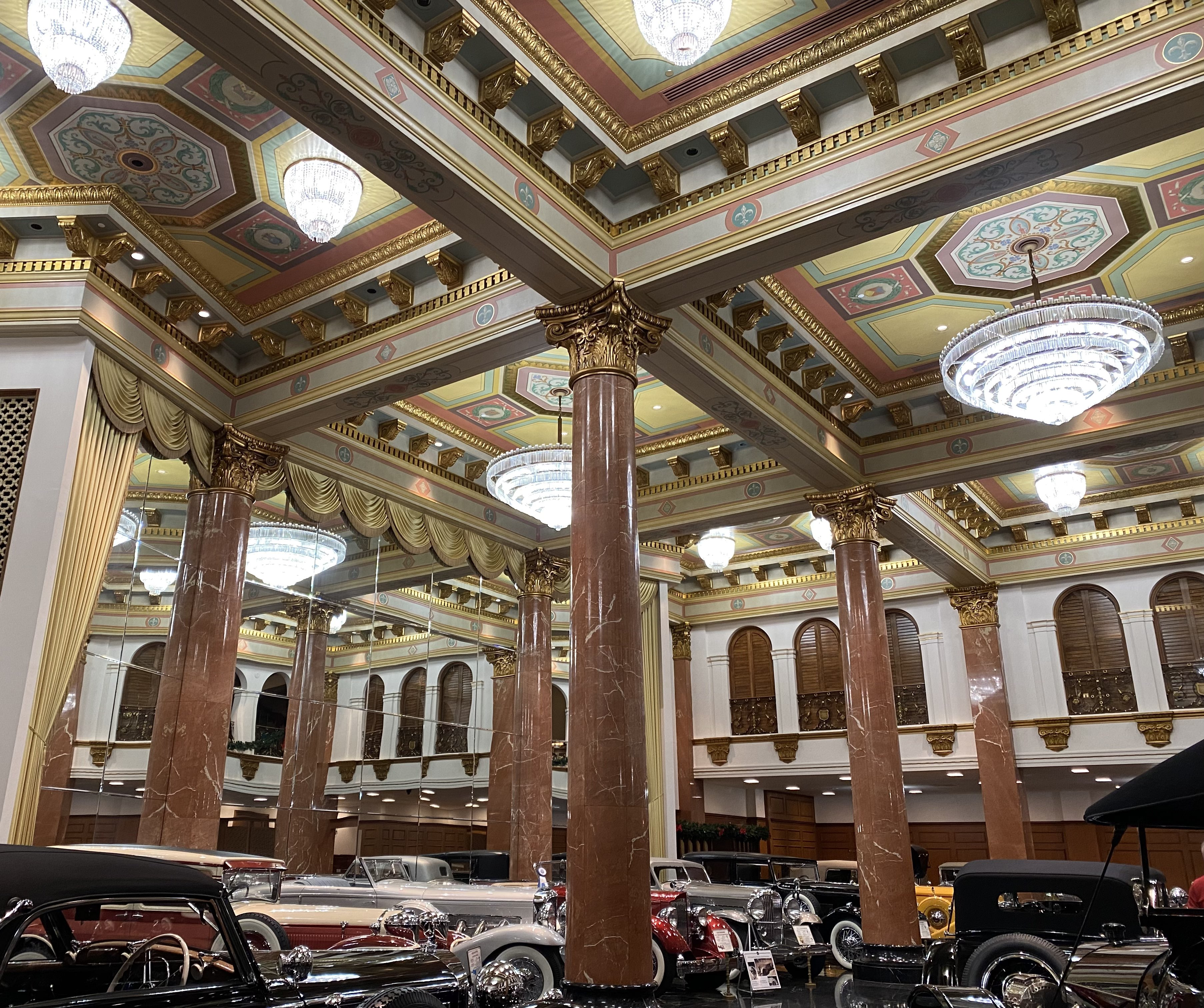
Second floor Grand salon view 1

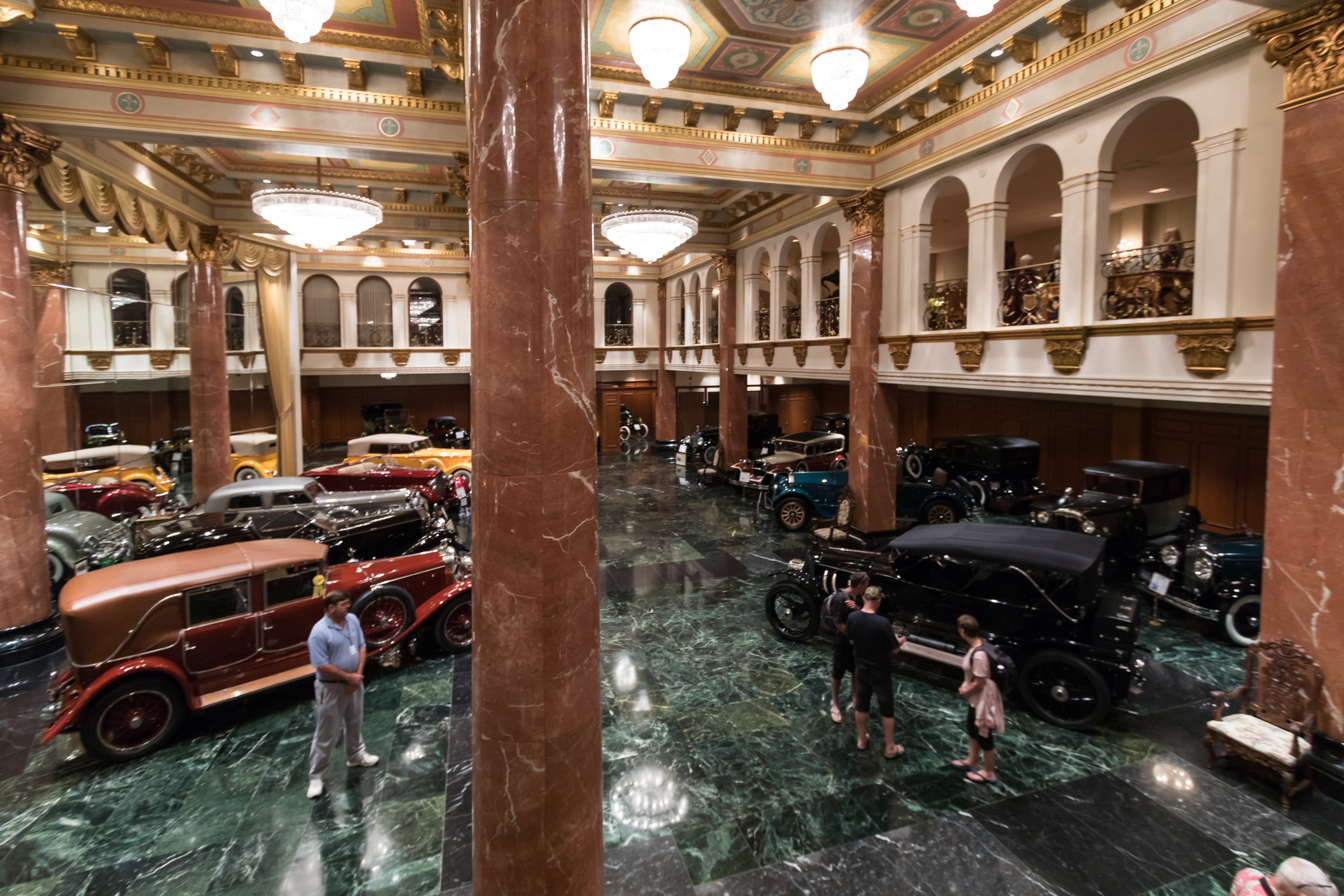
Grand salon view 2

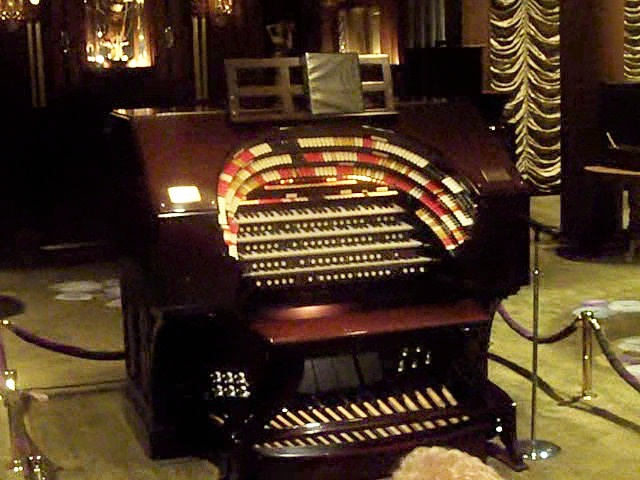
Mighty Wurlitzer theatre organ

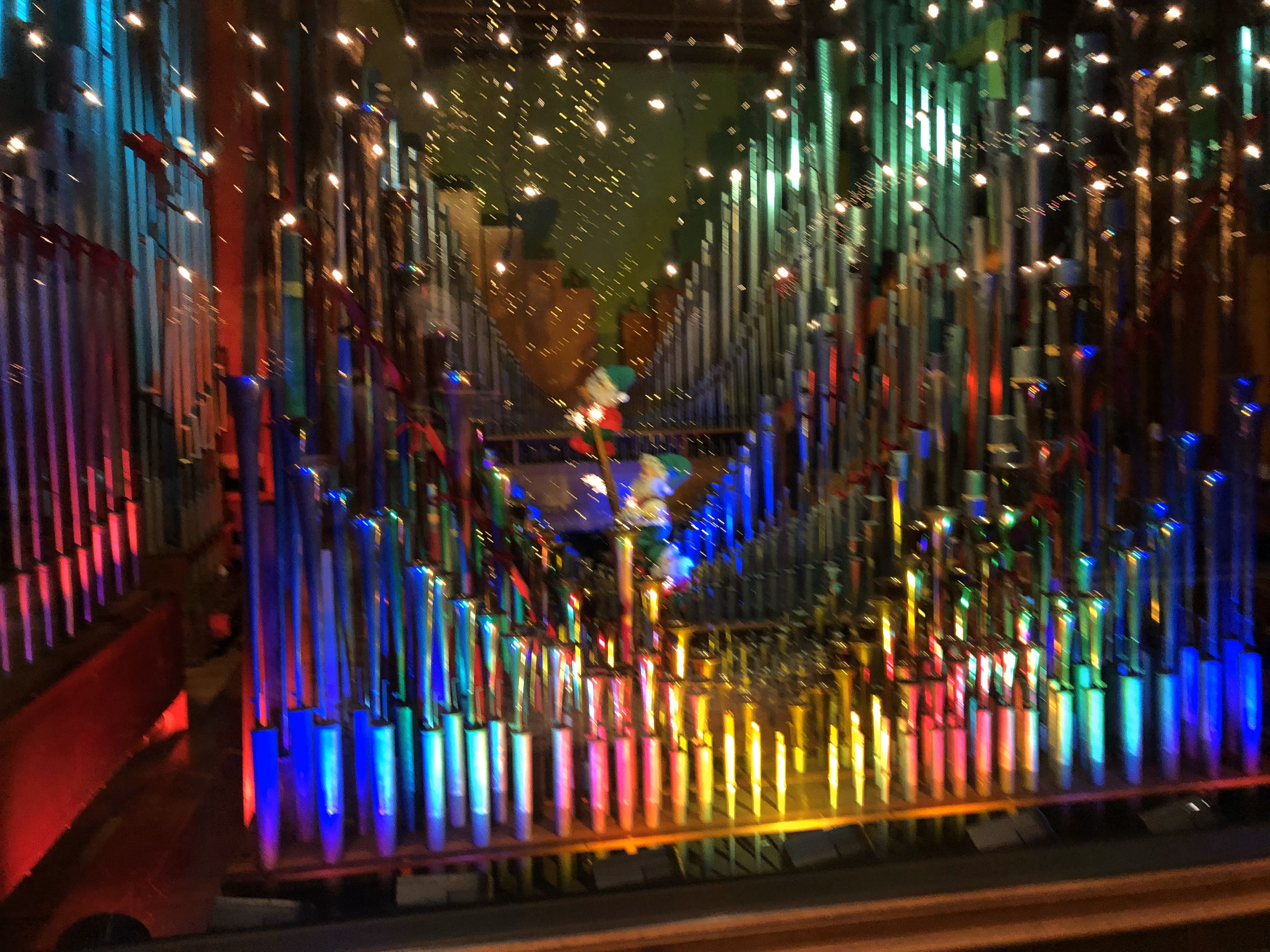
Portion of the Wurlizer pipe organs

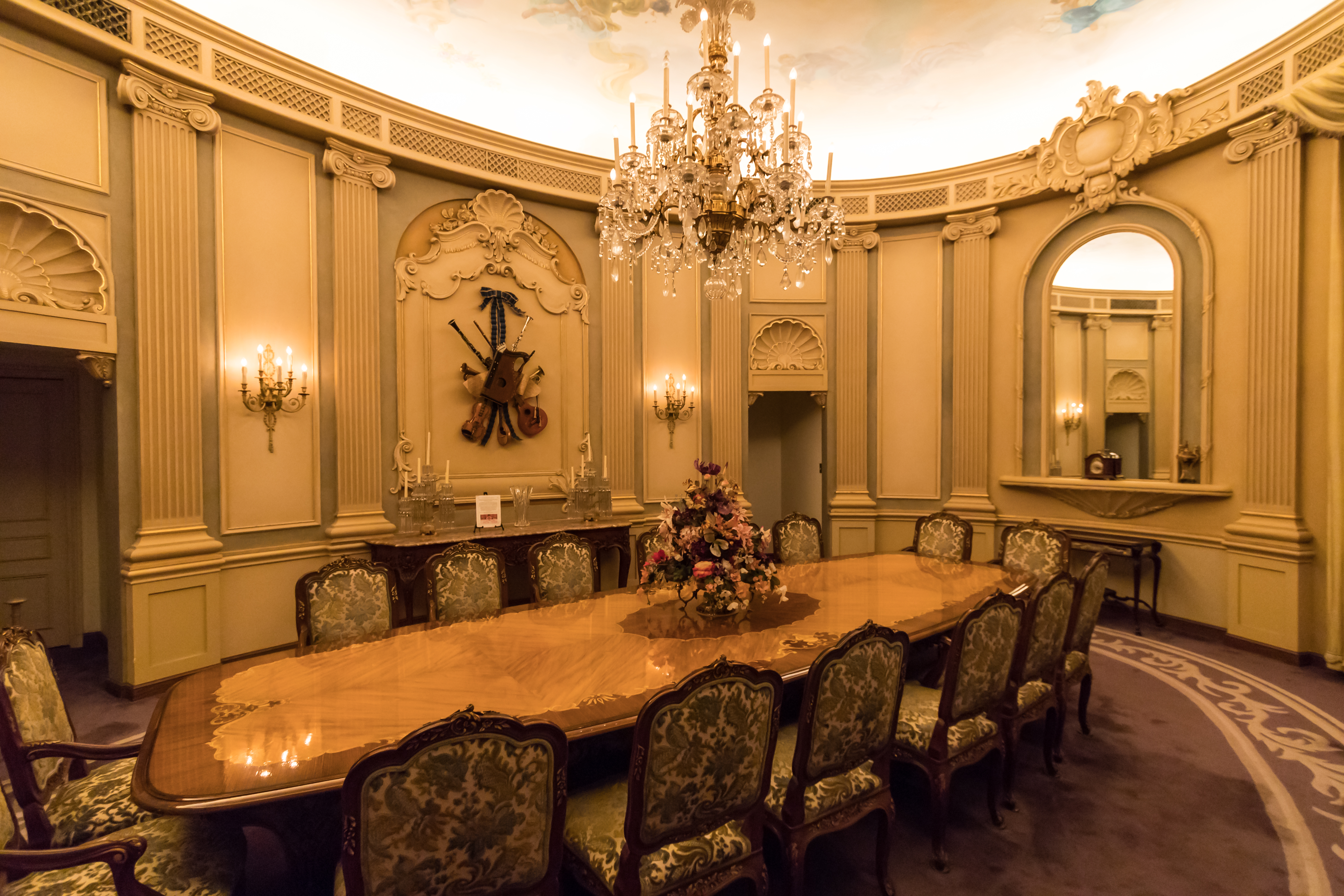
Louis XV dining room

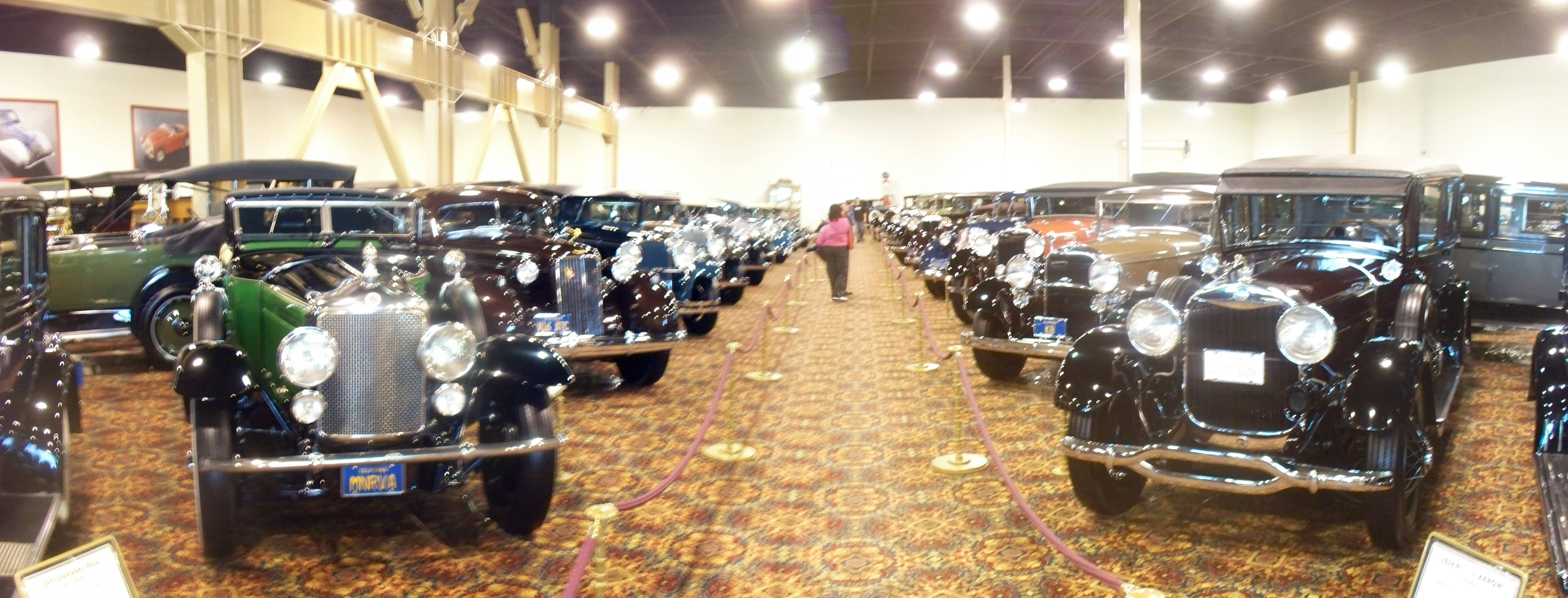
Cars in the museum

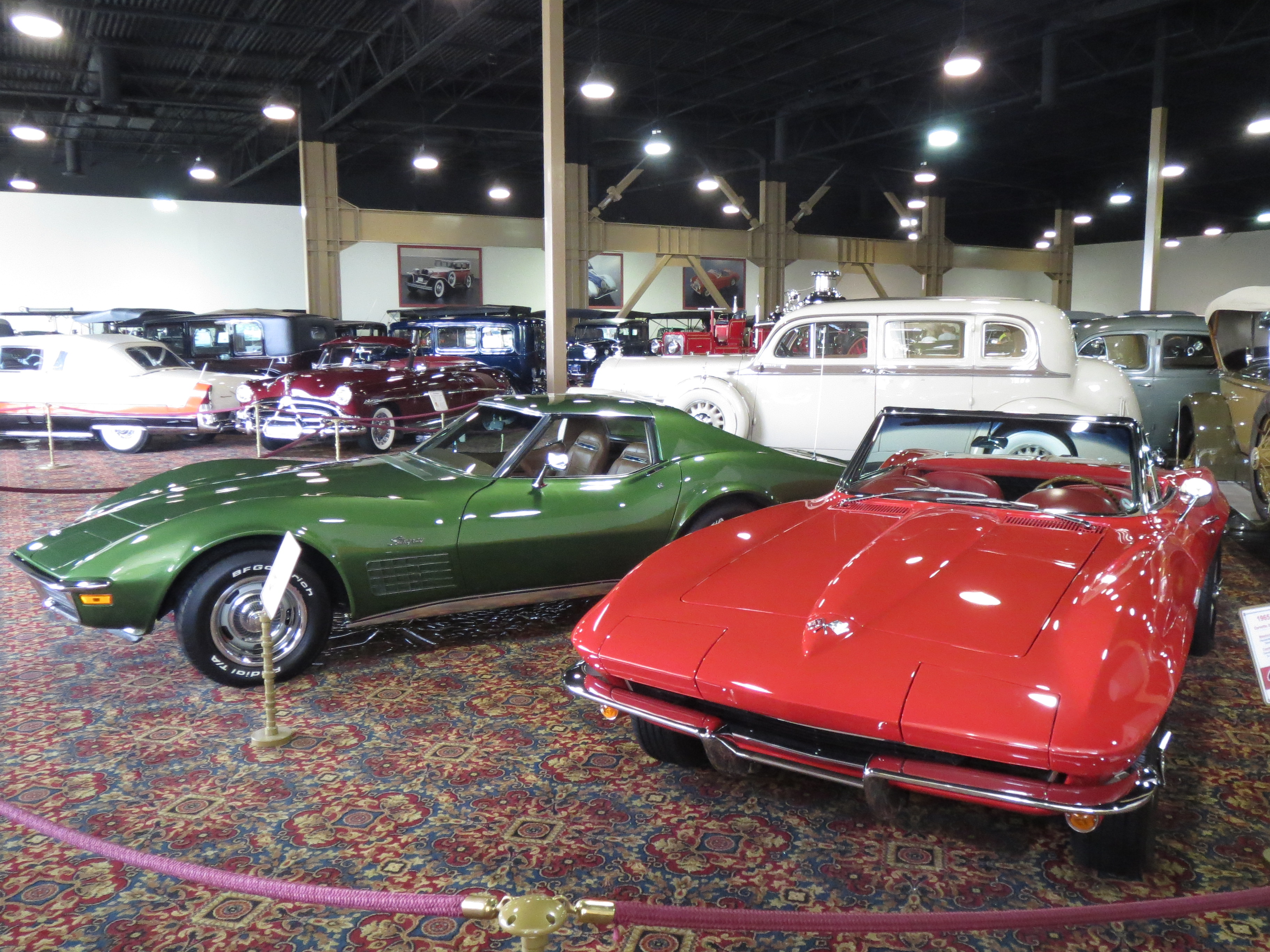
Chevrolet Corvettes in the museum

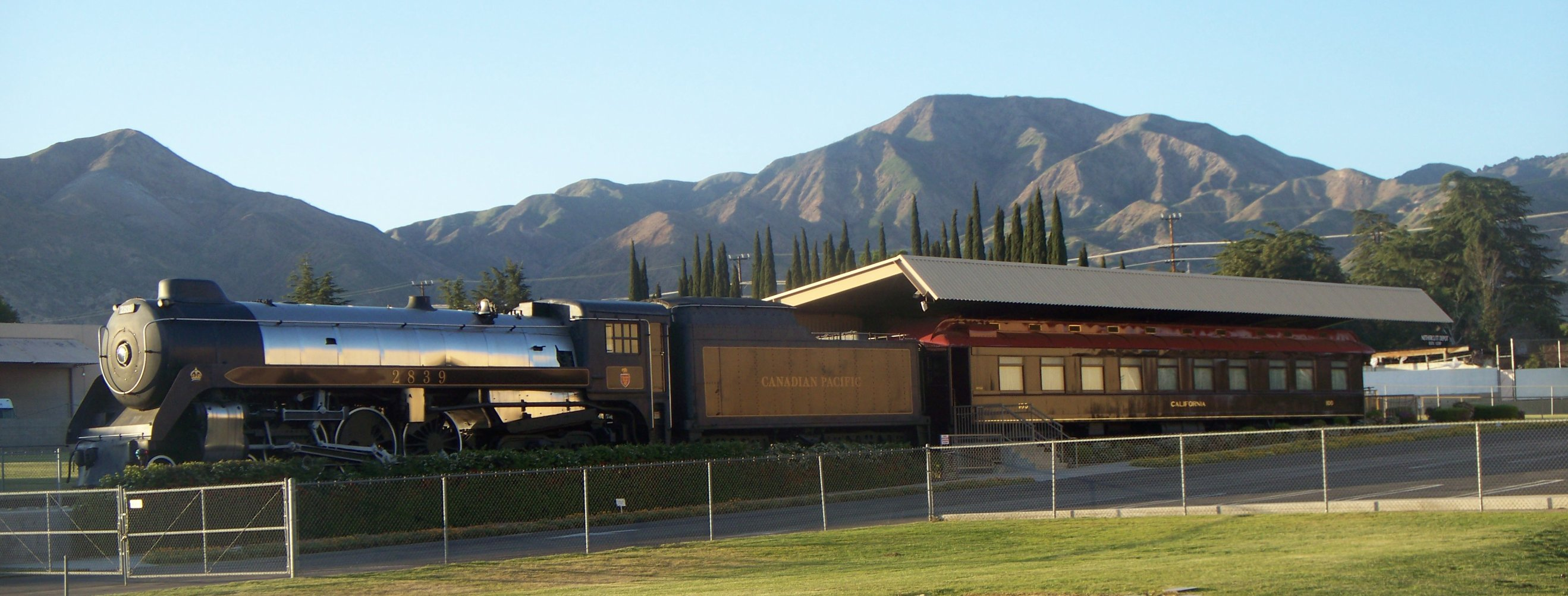
Outside display with the Royal Hudson and Pullman Car

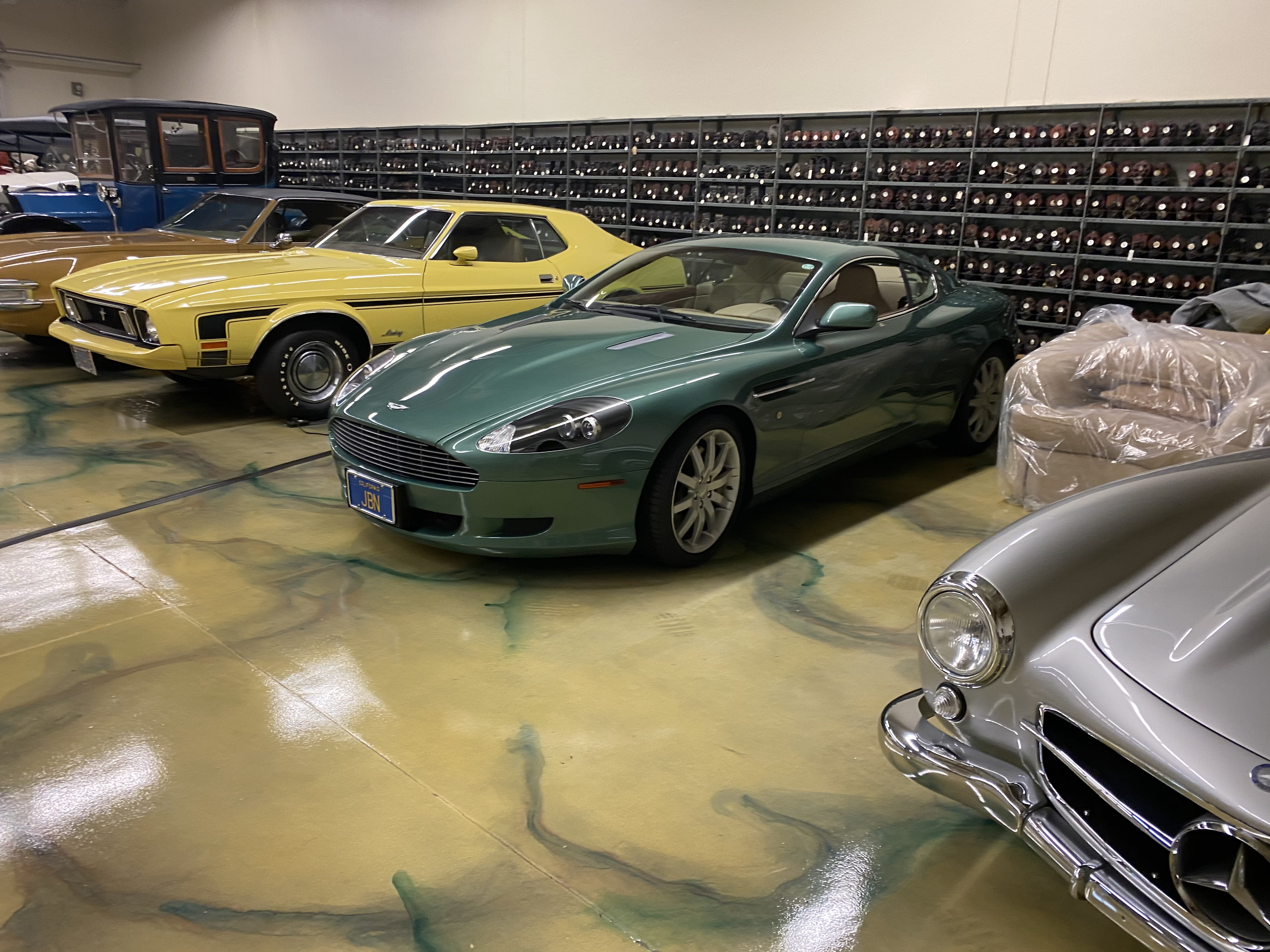
One of the Collection's storage rooms with an Aston Martin DB9

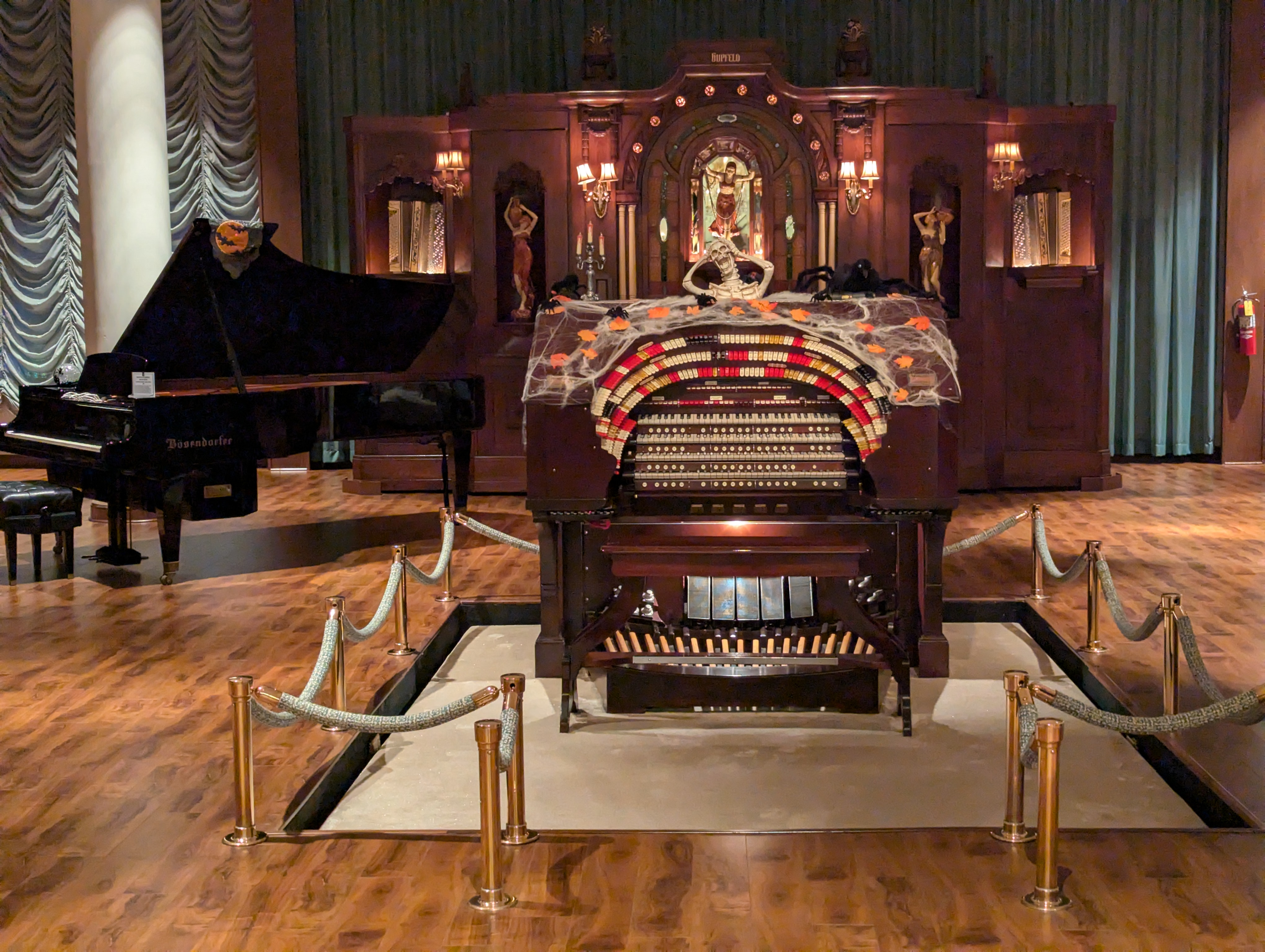
Music room with the Wurlitzer pipe organ and player pianos

== See also ==
- List of music museums
- List of automobile museums
