= Canadian Pacific Royal Hudson =

Canadian steam locomotive series

Canadian Pacific Royal Hudson Class H1c H1d H1e
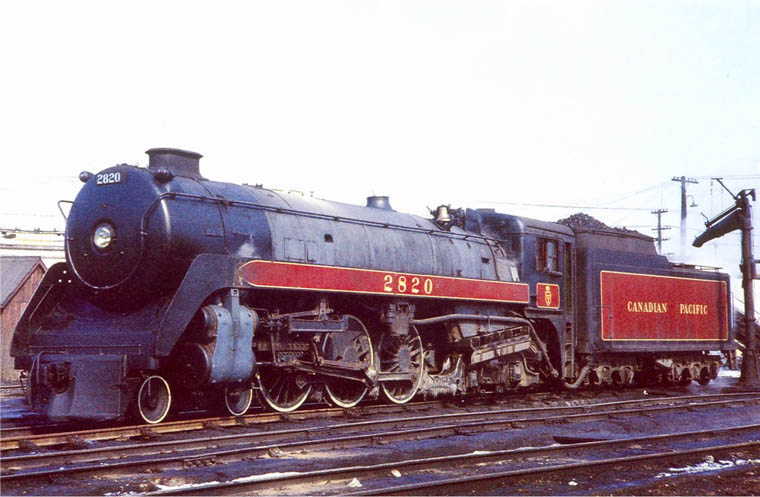
- Canadian Pacific Royal Hudson No. 2820, the first locomotive of the class, in Montreal on March 24, 1960.
Type and origin
- Power type: Steam
- Builder: Montreal Locomotive Works
- Serial number: 68951–68980 (H1c); 69100–69109 (H1d); 69292–69296 (H1e)
- Build date: 1937 (30); 1938 (10); 1940 (5)
Specifications
- Configuration
  - Whyte: 4-6-4
  - UIC: 2′C2′ h2S
- Gauge: 4 ft 8 1/2 in (1,435 mm)
- Driver dia.: 75 in (1.9 m)
- Adhesive weight: 186,800 lb (84.7 t) (H1c/H1d); 194,000 lb (88 t) (H1e)
- Loco weight: 354,000 lb (161 t) (H1c/H1d); 366,000 lb (166 t) (H1e)
- Fuel type: Coal, later oil
- Fuel capacity: Coal: 21 t (21 long tons; 23 short tons); Oil: 4,100 imp gal (19,000 L; 4,900 US gal)
- Water cap.: 14,400 imp gal (65,000 L; 17,300 US gal)
- Boiler pressure: 275 lbf/in^{2} (1.90 MPa)
- Cylinders: Two, outside
- Cylinder size: 22 in × 30 in (560 mm × 760 mm)
- Valve gear: Walschaerts
- Valve type: Piston valves
- Loco brake: Air
- Train brakes: Air
- Couplers: Knuckle
Performance figures
- Tractive effort: Loco: 45,254 lbf (201.30 kN), Booster: 12,000 lbf (53 kN), Loco w/ booster: 57,000 lbf (250 kN)
Career
- Operators: Canadian Pacific Railway
- Class: H1c (30), H1d (10), H1e (5)
- Numbers: 2820–2849 (H1c); 2850–2859 (H1d); 2860–2864 (H1e)
- Locale: East of Rocky Mountains (H1c/H1d); West of Rocky Mountains (H1e)
- Retired: 1958-1965
- Preserved: Four (Nos. 2839, 2850, 2858 and 2860) preserved, remainder scrapped
- Disposition: Nos. 2839, 2850, 2858 and 2860 are on static display.

The Canadian Pacific Railway H1c, d, and e "Royal Hudson" class locomotives were a class of 45 semi-streamlined 4-6-4 "Hudson" type steam locomotives formerly owned and operated by the Canadian Pacific Railway (CPR) and built by Montreal Locomotive Works (MLW). The engines were built between 1937 and 1940. In 1939, King George VI allowed the CPR to use the term after No. 2850 transported the royal train across Canada with no need of replacement. These locomotives were in service between 1937 and 1960. Four of them have been preserved. No. 2839 was used to power excursions for the Southern Railway Steam Program between 1979 and 1980. No. 2860 was used for excursion service in British Columbia between 1974 and 1999, then again between 2006 and 2010.

== Regular service ==
The Canadian Pacific Railway (CPR) owned a total of 65 class H1 Hudsons built by Montreal Locomotive Works (MLW). Classes H1a and H1b, numbered 2800–2819, were not semi-streamlined and were not "Royal" Hudsons. The CPR owned 30 class H1c Royal Hudsons, numbered 2820–2849, built in 1937, 10 class H1d Royal Hudsons, numbered 2850–2859, built in 1938, and five class H1e Royal Hudsons, numbered 2860–2864, built in 1940. The class H1c and class H1d Royal Hudsons were used in passenger and freight service in Eastern Canada. The class H1e (Nos. 2860−2864) Royal Hudsons were all built as oil-burners for the service between Vancouver and Revelstoke where they worked until they were displaced by diesels. At the end of 1952 the H1c and H1d were assigned to the sheds in Montreal (10), Toronto (7), Fort William (4), Winnipeg (17) and Calgary (2) – the brackets showing the assigned number of locomotives. All five H1e were assigned to Vancouver.

The Royal Hudsons were used on all main lines of the CPR except Montreal–Saint John due to bridge weight restrictions. They worked almost all transcontinental passenger trains. The Dominion was hauled by a Royal Hudson 811 miles (1,305 km) from Toronto to Fort William and by another one 1,250 miles (2,010 km) further on to Calgary. There, a more powerful Selkirk took over till Revelstoke and another Royal Hudson brought the train over the last 379 miles (610 km) to Vancouver.

By 1960, all of the 20 Hudsons and 45 Royal Hudsons had been retired due to having been completely replaced by diesel locomotives.

== Royal visit ==
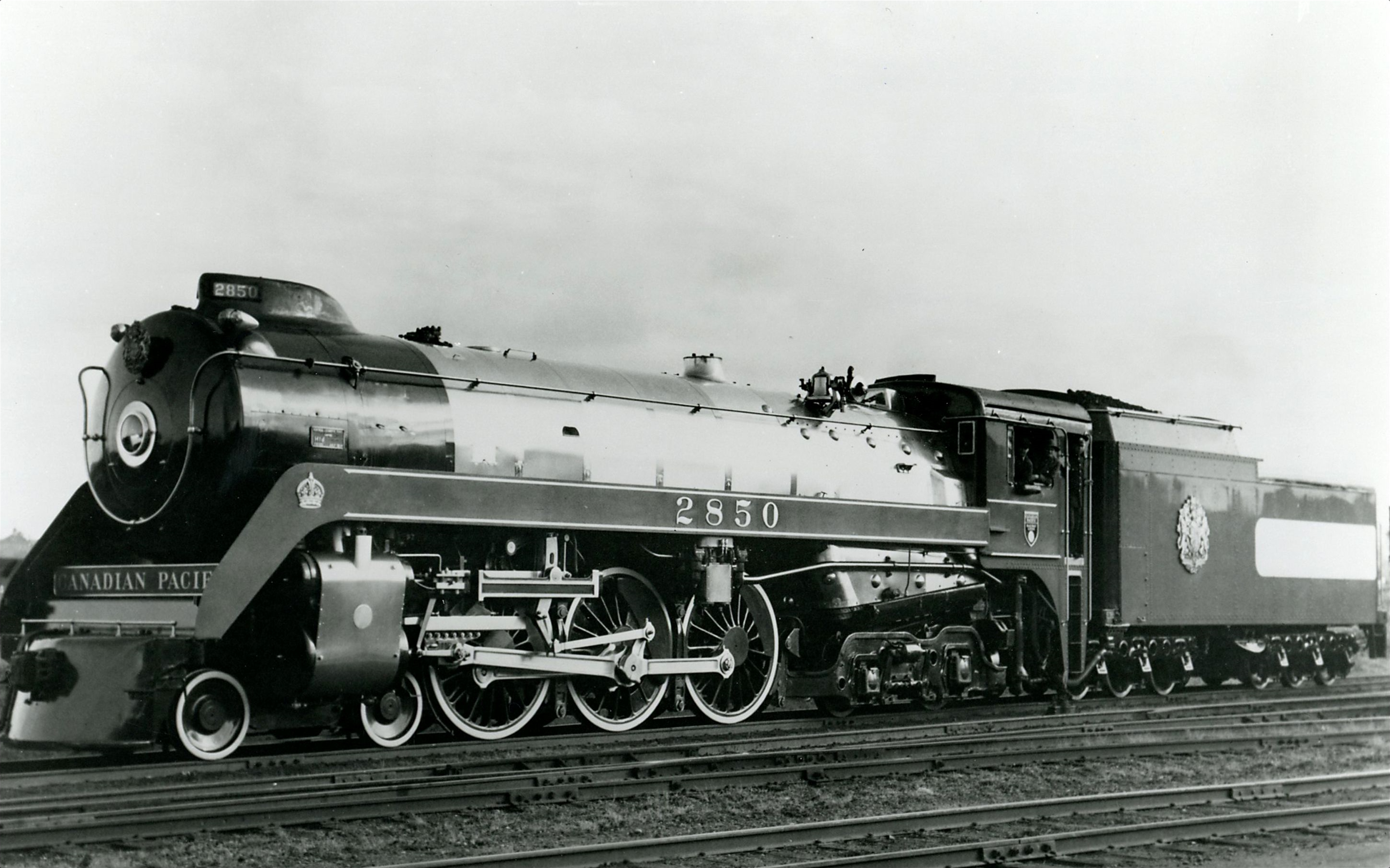
Royal Hudson No. 2850, adorned in regalia, after arriving in Vancouver with King George VI and Queen Elizabeth on the Royal Train in 1939.

In 1939, King George VI and Queen Elizabeth visited Canada, arriving at Wolfe's Cove, Quebec, on 17 May 1939. This was the first time that a reigning monarch had visited Canada. The king and queen took a tour of the country by rail. The CPR and the Canadian National Railways (CNR) shared the honours of transporting the royal train across the country, with the CPR undertaking the westbound journey, from Quebec City to Vancouver.

The steam locomotive that the CPR used to pull the train was numbered 2850, a 4-6-4 built by Montreal Locomotive Works. Specially painted in silver and blue, the locomotive ran 3,224 mi (5,189 km) across Canada, through 25 changes of crew, without engine failure. The king, being a railfan, rode in the cab when possible.

The king was so impressed with the performance of 2850 and its class, that after the tour, he gave the CPR permission to use the term "Royal Hudson" for the semi-streamlined locomotives of the class (numbered 2820–2859; locomotives 2860–2864 were built one year later as Royal Hudsons) and to display royal crowns on the running board skirts. This was the only time a locomotive outside of the United Kingdom was given royal status by the reigning monarch.

== Excursions ==
One Royal Hudson, No. 2860, was later used in excursion service. A class H1e Royal Hudson, it was built for the CPR by MLW in June 1940. It was the first locomotive of five to be built new as a Royal Hudson and delivered with painted cast-brass crowns affixed to its skirts. Between 1940 and 1956, it hauled transcontinental passenger trains between Revelstoke and Vancouver. It was damaged in a derailment outside Vancouver in 1956, but by 1957, it had been refurbished and was transferred to Winnipeg for prairie service. It was withdrawn from service in May 1959, and sat on the scrap line for five years. She was sold to the Vancouver Railway Museum Association in 1964. However, the association was unable to find a place to display the locomotive, and it remained in storage at the Drake Street shops in Vancouver. Once again, the locomotive faced the risk of being scrapped, but she then was sold to Joe W. Hussey in 1970.

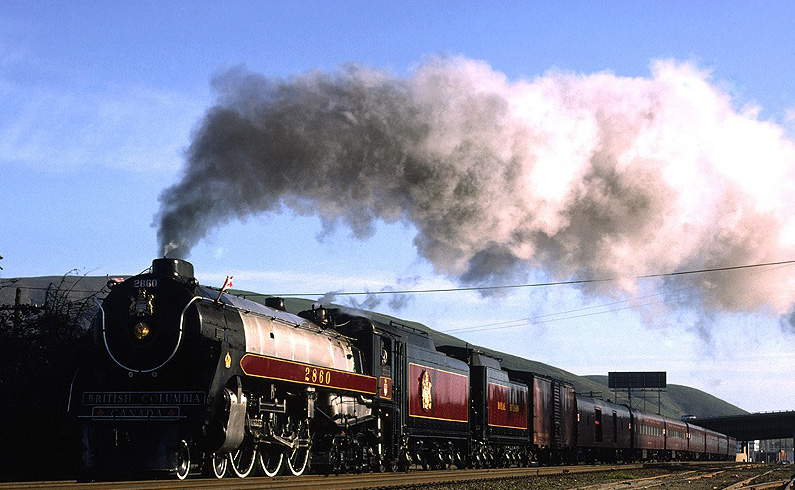
No. 2860 on a promotional tour to the United States in 1977

In 1973, Hussey sold No. 2860 to the British Columbia government. The locomotive was restored by Robert E. Swanson's Railway Appliance Research Ltd. team and the staff of the CPR's Drake Street Roundhouse shops beginning on November 25, 1973, and then operated by the British Columbia Department of Travel Industry with the cooperation of the British Columbia Railway. The BCR commenced a Royal Hudson steam excursion service between North Vancouver and Squamish on June 20, 1974. By the end of the 1974 tourist season, 47,295 passengers had been carried and the excursion was deemed successful. It was the only regularly scheduled steam excursion over mainline trackage in North America. The excursion operated between May and October, from Wednesday through Saturday. The 2860 also travelled North America in the late 1970s as a promotion for BC tourism. She quickly became one of British Columbia's main tourist attractions and an icon of Canadian steam power.

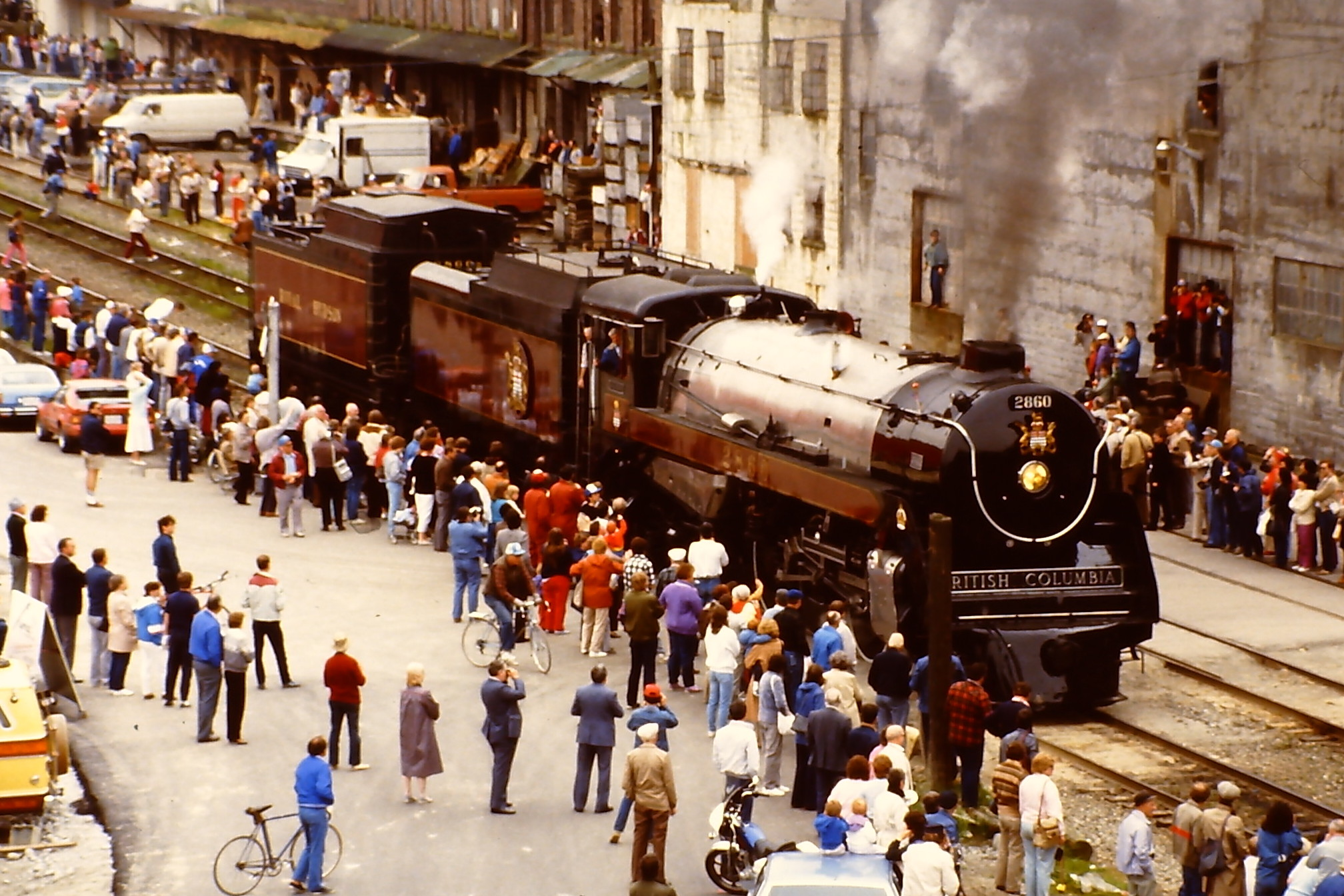
No. 2860 at Steam Expo '86 in 1986

In 1986, from May 2 to October 13, Vancouver held its Expo 86 World Exposition. Transportation/communication were the themes for the fair and every form of transport was represented. One of the greatest and most memorable events during Expo 86 was Steam Expo. This was known as "the largest gathering of operating steam locomotives in the world, since the 1948 Worlds Fair in Chicago". Steam Expo saw over 20 operating steam locomotives from all over the United States, as well as Canada. From May 23 to June 1, steam power was represented, from operating replicas of the earliest steam locomotives, such as: the John Bull, Stephensons Rocket and Tom Thumb to the modern steamers of the 1920s to the 1950s, including: the 2860, Canadian National Railway 4-6-0 No. 1392, Union Pacific Railroad 0-6-0 No. 4466, CN 4–8–2, U-1-f No. 6060, Great Western Railroad 2-8-0 No. 51 and Canadian Pacific Railroad, G5a 4-6-2 No. 1201. The highlight of Steam Expo was the Grand Parade of Steam, which featured all 20 invited steam engines making their way along the Vancouver waterfront, right next to the Canada Pavilion. During the Grand Parade of Steam, each of the locomotives "whistled, chugged and puffed" gingerly behind each other, as they made their way, passing throngs of thousands of people that lined the tracks of the parade route, and as each steamer puffed by, response from the crowds resulted in spontaneous applause. The display site for Steam Expo was at the CN railyard on Terminal Avenue, located adjacent to the East Gate of Expo 86.

In October 1988, the Royal Hudson Steam Society, along with the Rocky Mountain Rail Society, operated the longest steam-powered double-headed excursion train ever attempted in North America. The excursion service on BC Rail between Squamish and North Vancouver has ended for the year of 1988, making it possible for the 3716 and the 2860 to be used on the trip. The 2860 operated on the "Great Canadian Steam Excursion" special on a five-day, 2,030 km (1,260 mi) roundtrip tour, that featured the locomotive doubleheading the train, along with Canadian National 4-8-2 No. 6060 and Canadian Pacific 2-8-0 No. 3716. The excursion operated from October 21 to 25 on Canadian National, Canadian Pacific and BC Rail trackage from North Vancouver to Kamloops, Jasper, Prince George, 100 Mile House and return to North Vancouver. Over the course of the five-day trip, the train travelled through some of Canada's most spectacular scenery, from the rocky canyons and wide valleys, to the lush forests and rolling rivers.

This special excursion run was also historic, because this was the 'homecoming trip' for CN 6060, which had been staying Vancouver since her visit to Steam Expo 86, and her long-time stay at the BC Rail steam shops in Squamish, having been used on roundtrip excursions between North Vancouver and Squamish. During 6060's stay, she often doubleheaded with 2860 and 3716 on excursion trains on rare occasions.

The first two days of the "Great Canadian Steam Excursion" special featured 2860 and 6060 pulling the train from North Vancouver to Kamloops and Jasper. On the first day, 2860 was on the point of the train. On the second day, 6060 was on the point from Kamloops to Jasper. For the third day of the excursion, the 6060 developed a problem with a crosshead bearing and could not be used on the run to Prince George. Since Jasper was the home base for 6060 and the Rocky Mountain Rail Society, 2860 led the excursion train solo to Prince George. This portion of the excursion took the train through Yellowhead Pass, on the Canadian National's transcontinental mainline, just west of Jasper National Park. The highlight of the trip was a photo runby at Dunster. The remainder of the trip from Prince George to 100 Mile House and North Vancouver featured the 3716 on the point with 2860 behind the 2-8-0's auxiliary tank/water car. This was done while following standardized railroad practice: the small 2-8-0 was the pilot engine, followed by the biggest locomotive 2860. The rest of the excursion was on BC Rail trackage for the remaining 750 km (466 mi) back to Vancouver.

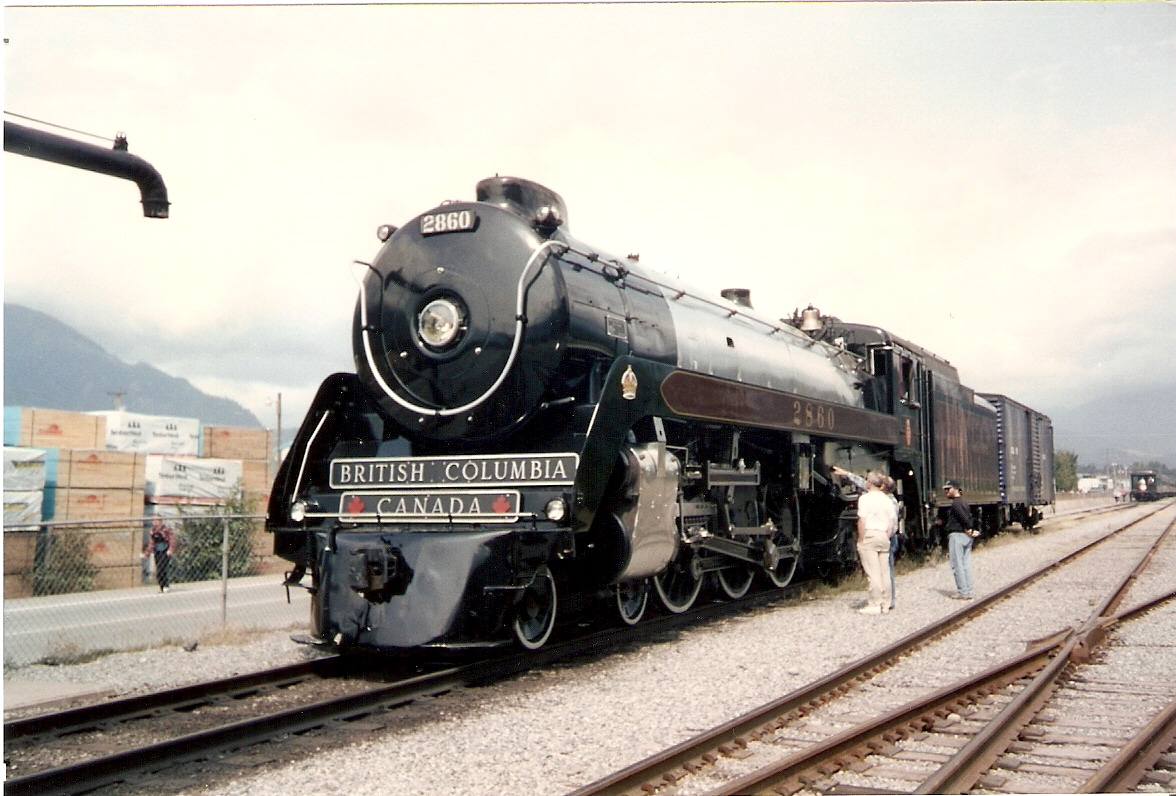
Royal Hudson No. 2860 in Squamish British Columbia.

The consist for the steam special was made up of several Tuscan red and maroon painted coaches from the 2860 group and BC Rail, as well as a couple of blue and yellow painted coaches, supplied by Via Rail. The first three days of the trip, had the train made up of about 16 coaches. For the last two days of the excursion, the special consisted of just 10 coaches. Tied to the drawbar of each locomotives was an auxiliary water tender with additional water.

The excursion trip however was plagued with a few setbacks along the way. On the first day of the trip, 2860 and 6060 led the train to Kamloops. Several hours into the trip, while passing through Chilliwack, the rear wheel-set on the last passenger car of the train, picked a switch and derailed. No one was hurt. The steam special was delayed for about four hours, before the derailed coach was re-railed. The following morning, at the Kamloops Rail Yard, 2860's front and leading driving wheels came off the tracks, while being turned on the wye. This resulted in the excursion train being delayed again for several hours until the 2860 was re-railed. On the fourth day, 3716 suffered a mechanical lubricator failure during the midway portion of the journey to 100 Mile House, B.C. However, a crew member of the locomotive cautiously stood on the running board of 3716 and lubricated by hand for the journey to 100 Mile House. On the final day of the trip, 3716's lubricator was successfully repaired.

Despite the setbacks, the rest of the trip for the remainder of the two days that followed were uneventful. The steam excursion was a successful event for the crew members of the 2860, 6060, 3716 and BC Rail.

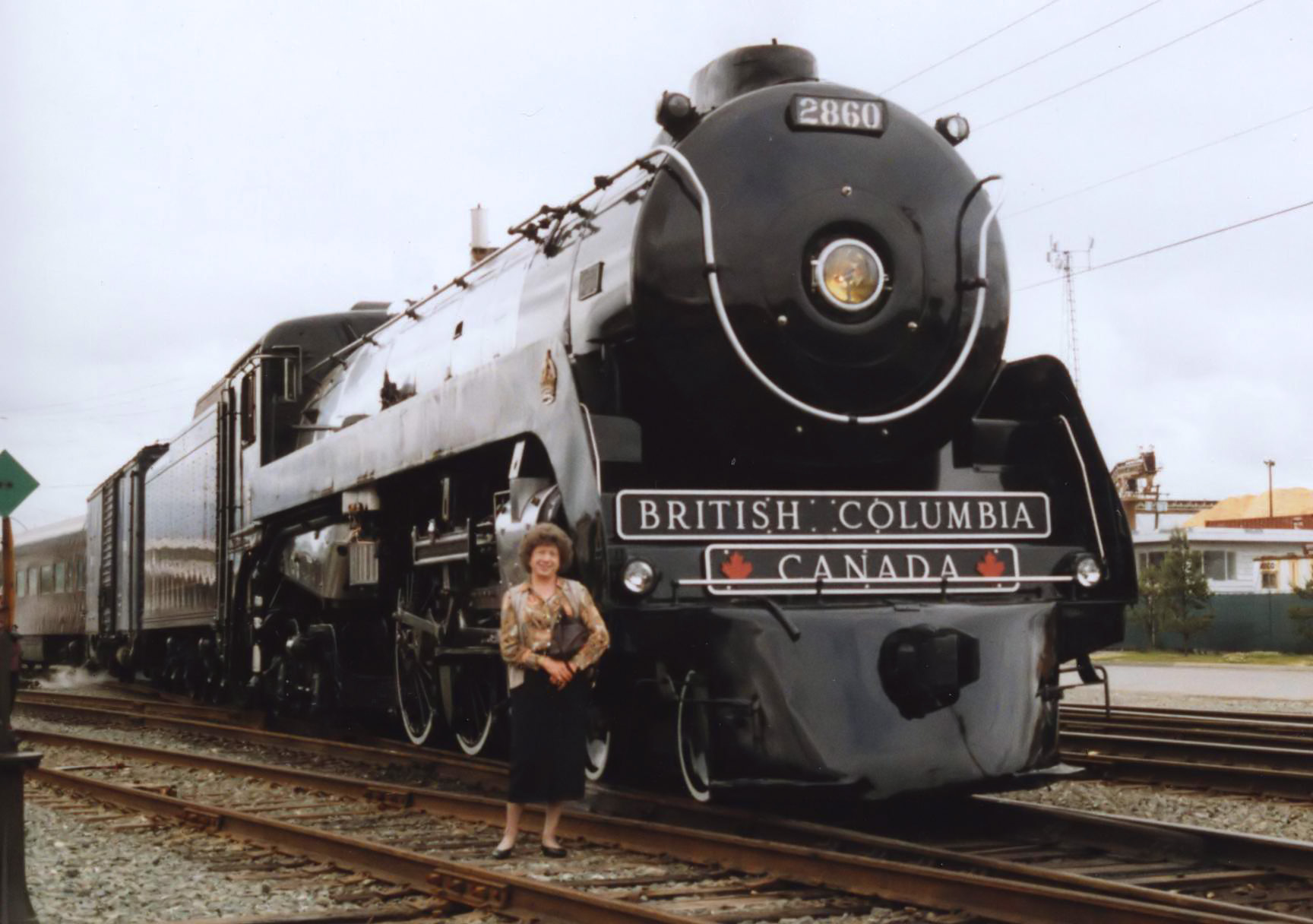
Royal Hudson 4-6-4 No. 2860 at North Vancouver station before departure to Squamish in 1996

While the engine was being prepared for the Christmas trains at the end of the 1999 tourist season, 2860 was found to have serious leaks from the superheater elements. The superheaters and the arch tubes were known to be life expired and some other fairly major boiler work was required. A variety of factors prevented BC Rail from carrying out the repairs immediately, including the fact that Canadian Pacific 2816 was in the BCR shop being rebuilt under contract, and that all BC Rail passenger services were under threat in the lead-up to the eventual privatization of BC Rail. After the election of the BC Liberal government in 2001 all passenger services were gradually phased out starting with the Royal Hudson excursion. The Royal Hudson excursion used other locomotives during the 2000 and 2001 seasons, such as back up locomotive No. 3716 (an ex-Canadian Pacific 2-8-0 which is also provincially owned and as of 2024 operates on the Kettle Valley Steam Railway in Summerland).

On September 28, 2006, the Royal Hudson steamed into the WCRA Squamish station under its own power for the first time since October 1999. The restoration took just over one year with a cost of over $250,000. Money for the restoration was provided wholly by donations. The WCRA also had difficulty locating missing parts. Some of the major components, such as the trailing truck, were borrowed from sister engine 2850. The borrowed parts had to be returned when 2850 was put on public display. WCRA replaced the borrowed tailing truck with one that was being used at a mine, which had salvaged the truck from a Royal Hudson due for scrap. The truck turned out to have been taken off of 2860 when it was sitting on the scrap line in the 1960s. Over the next four years, 2860 was steamed up regularly for publicity and to salute passing passenger trains, including the Whistler Mountaineer (which the locomotive lead to Squamish on May 16, 2009). Other runs were made on CN (Formerly BC Rail) and CPKC trackage, mainly for transfer moves, and BNSF and Southern Railway of British Columbia trackage, which were excursions to White Rock and Cloverdale.

On December 9, 2010, the 2860 and the Royal Hudson train-set were scheduled to depart North Vancouver for Squamish at 12:30 pm on the last of its scheduled excursion trips in 2010. The 2860's certification expired in January 2011 and the cost of the necessary work was estimated at over CA$1 million. The December 9 trip was likely its last for a long time.

As of 2010, 2860 is still owned by the British Columbia government, but is on permanent loan to the West Coast Railway Association (WCRA) and housed at the Railway Museum of British Columbia in Squamish.

== Southern 2839 ==
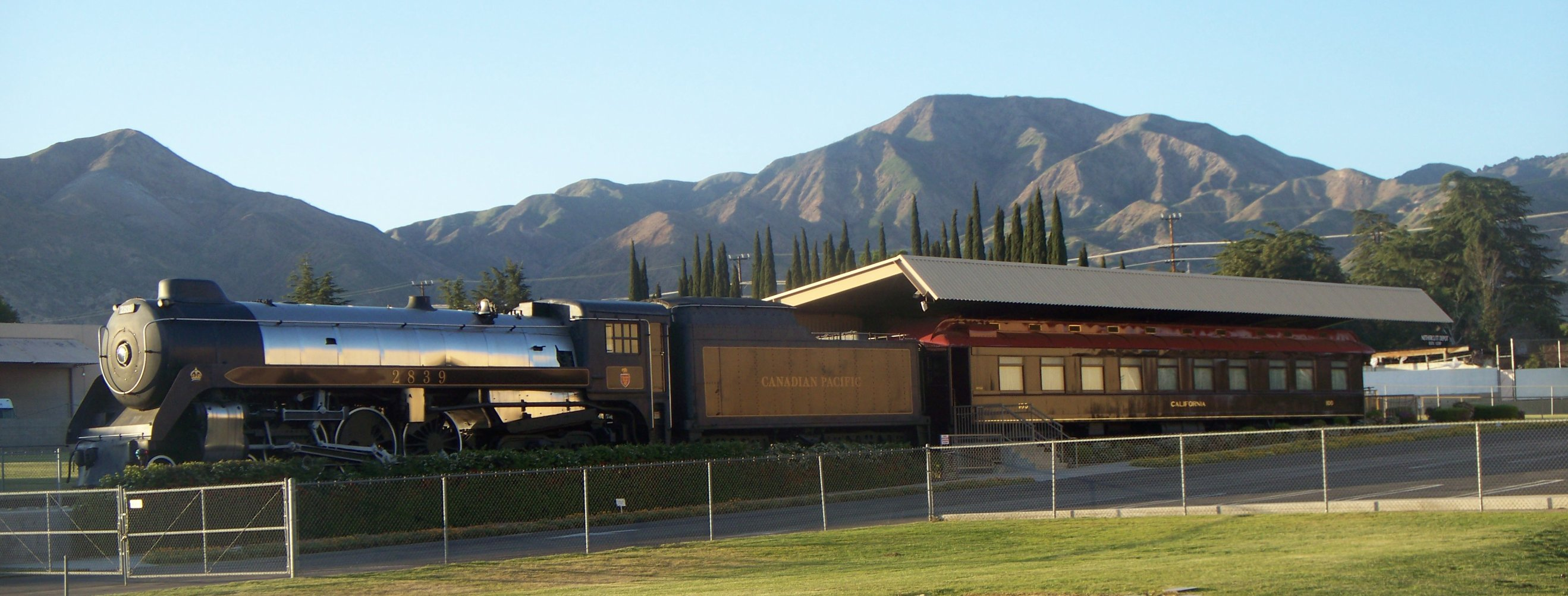
Royal Hudson No. 2839 is on display at the Nethercutt Collection in Sylmar, California, with a 1912 Pullman Private Car.

Royal Hudson No. 2839 was once destined for a museum in eastern Canada and wound up being sold to a group of owners in Pennsylvania. After a restoration to full working order to full CPR livery (with Southern lettering), the engine was leased to the Southern Railway for their steam excursion program in 1979–1980, but was found that the locomotive was not powerful enough for their excursions. During her brief career with the Southern, 2839 earned the nickname "beer can" due to the Royal Hudson's cylindrical streamlined design. After being returned from the Southern, the engine was stored on the Blue Mountain and Reading Railroad (BM&R) before being stored near Allentown, Pennsylvania. The BM&R attempted to restore and run her on excursions, but ultimately 2839 was sold. After a series of owners, the engine was shipped on a flat car from Pennsylvania to the Nethercutt Collection in Sylmar, California, where it was cosmetically restored and put on display outside the museum with a Pullman car.

Royal Hudson locomotive 2839 appears in the 1980 Academy Award-winning movie Coal Miner's Daughter. The train is in Southern Railway guise and can be seen in operation in two scenes. However, the Southern never owned any 4-6-4 Hudson locomotives.

== Preservation ==
Four Royal Hudson locomotives have been preserved. Note that Canadian Pacific "Hudson" No. 2816 is not streamlined and thus is not "Royal".

Preserved Royal Hudson locomotives
Type	Number	Image	Date built	Serial number	Location	Coordinates	Notes
H1c	2839		September 1937	68970	Nethercutt Collection, Sylmar, California	34.30753°N 118.46481°W	Previously hauled excursions for the Southern Railway Steam Program between September 1979 and December 1980. Painted blue in 2023 and bright red in 2025.
H1d	2850		August 1938	69100	Canadian Railway Museum, Saint-Constant, Quebec	45.37528°N 73.56434°W	Pulled the Canadian Pacific Railway Royal Train in 1939 carrying King George VI and Queen Elizabeth.
H1d	2858		August 1938	69108	Canada Science and Technology Museum, Ottawa, Ontario	45.40392°N 75.61922°W	
H1e	2860		June 1940	69292	Railway Museum of British Columbia, Squamish, British Columbia	49.72753°N 123.16080°W	Previously hauled regularly scheduled excursions for the British Columbia Railway between 1974 and 1999, and for the West Coast Railway Association from 2006 to 2010.

== See also ==
- Canadian Pacific Railway § Royal trains
- Canadian Pacific Railway § Steam locomotives
