= Canadian Pacific 2839 =

Steam locomotive

- No. 2839 on display in Sylmar, California, in May 2026
Type and origin
- Power type: Steam
- Builder: Montreal Locomotive Works
- Serial number: 68952
- Build date: 1937
Specifications
- Configuration
  - Whyte: 4-6-4
  - UIC: 2′C2′ h2
- Gauge: 4 ft 8 1/2 in (1,435 mm)
- Driver dia.: 75 in (1.9 m)
- Adhesive weight: 186,800 lb (84.7 t)
- Loco weight: 354,000 lb (161 t)
- Fuel type: Coal
- Boiler pressure: 275 lbf/in^{2} (1.90 MPa)
- Cylinders: Two, outside
- Cylinder size: 22 in × 30 in (560 mm × 760 mm)
- Valve gear: Inverted Walschaerts
- Valve type: Piston valves
- Loco brake: Air
- Train brakes: Air
- Couplers: Knuckle
Performance figures
- Tractive effort: Loco: 45,254 lbf (201.3 kN); Booster: 12,000 lbf (53.4 kN); Loco w/ booster: 57,254 lbf (254.7 kN)
Career
- Operators: Canadian Pacific Railway; Southern Railway; Blue Mountain and Reading Railroad (leased)
- Class: H1c
- Numbers: CP 2839; SOU 2839; AC 2839
- Nicknames: Beer Can
- Retired: 1959 (revenue service); 1985 (excursion service)
- Restored: 1979
- Disposition: On static display

Canadian Pacific 2839, nicknamed Beer Can, is a preserved H1c class 4-6-4 Royal Hudson type steam locomotive, built by the Montreal Locomotive Works (MLW) in September 1937 for the Canadian Pacific Railway and retired in 1959. It was restored to operating condition in 1979 by the Southern Railway (SOU) for their steam excursion program and was sold to the Blue Mountain and Reading Railroad (BM&R) before it was retired again in 1985.

It is now on static display at the Nethercutt Collection in Sylmar, California, United States.

== History ==
=== Revenue service (1937–1959) ===
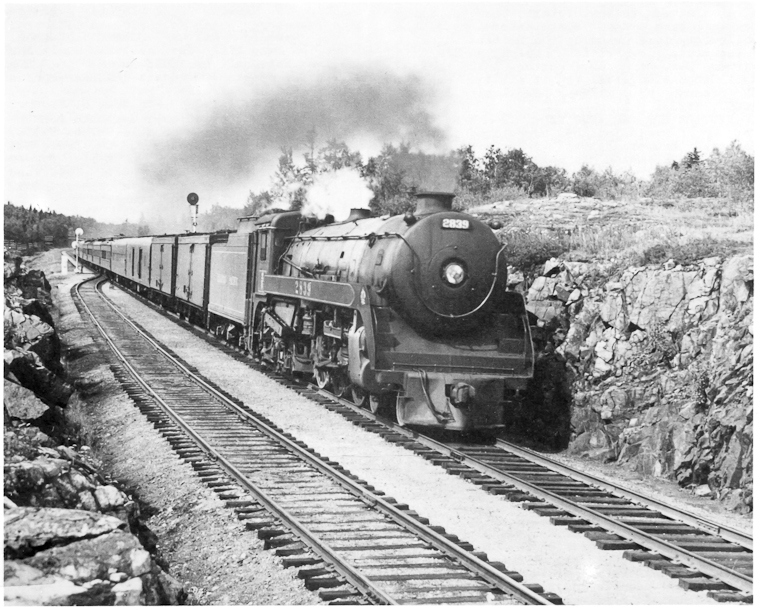
No. 2839 hauling The Dominion in Rossport, Ontario, eastbound on August 15, 1951

No. 2839 was built by the Montreal Locomotive Works in 1937 and was one of the brand new H1c/d Royal Hudson locomotives built for the Canadian Pacific Railway and their mainline passenger trains. No. 2839 had a mostly uneventful career, pulling these trains across the eastern stretch of the Canadian Pacific network, with the exception of the line from Montreal to Saint John, New Brunswick, due to low bridges. The locomotive was retired from revenue service in 1959.

=== Excursion service (1979–1985) ===
In 1969, No. 2839 was purchased by the Atlantic Central Steam Company, led by steam locomotive photographers Mike Eagleson, Ron Ziel, and Victor Hand, who restored the locomotive to operating condition by early 1979. The Southern Railway (SOU) leased it for two years of pulling excursions for their steam program. On March 3 and 4, 1979, No. 2839 began its inaugural run, pulling a one-way excursion train from Alexandria, Virginia, to Atlanta, Georgia, on SOU's mainline. It was nicknamed the Beer Can for its excursion runs. No. 2839 also wore a SOU long-bell 3-chime "steamboat" whistle, which came from Ps-4 No. 1406 and owned by SOU Master Mechanic of steam Bill Purdie. The locomotive appears in the 1980 film Coal Miner's Daughter, dressed as Southern 2839 The engine was sold to the Blue Mountain and Reading Railroad for the final run of the day.

=== Second retirement (1985–present) ===
The locomotive was shipped on a flatbed from Pennsylvania to the Nethercutt Collection apart of its museum wing expansion in 2000. It was cosmetically restored and put on outdoor display in Sylmar, California, with a Pullman car. The locomotive was repainted blue in 2023 and later bright red in 2025.

== Appearances in media ==
- The locomotive appears in the 1980 film Coal Miner's Daughter dressed as Southern 2839 on the Academy Award-winning movie.
- The locomotive appears in the fourth episode of the fourth series of The Golden Girls, "Yokel Hero", without its running board crowns or front plates.
