= Forest Grove Concours d'Elegance =

In 1973 the Forest Grove Rotary Club created the Forest Grove Concours d'Elegance to raise funds for scholarships and financial aid to over 700 Washington County students to Pacific and other universities and community service projects. Each year, the net proceeds are divided equally among the two.

The Forest Grove Concours d'Elegance is held on the third Sunday in July, on the Pacific University campus (founded in 1849) in Forest Grove, Oregon. Over 300 antique, collector and special interest automobiles are on display.

The event features 40 classes of restored antique, classic and special interest cars. They are entered for judging, or just for display. Judging is based on quality and authenticity of restoration. Cars from every era of automotive history are represented, from the earliest horseless carriages to the latest sports cars.

== Best of Show winners by year ==
- 2013: 1931 Duesenberg Model SJ (shown by Tom & Susan Armstrong)
- 2014: 1938 Alfa Romeo 8C 2900B (shown by Jon Shirley)
- 2015: 1934 Packard Dual Cowl Sport Phaeton (shown by Larry Naninni)
- 2016: 1935 Mercedes-Benz 500K Sports Touring Car (shown by Thomas and Rhonda Taffet)
- 2017: 1937 Cord 812 Phaeton Supercharged (shown by Norman and Judi Noakes)
- 2018:
- 2019:

== Nearby Concours d'Elegance ==
- Kirkland Concours d'Elegance (Kirkland, WA)
- Pebble Beach Concours d'Elegance (Carmel, CA)
- Dana Point Concours d'Elegance (Dana Point, CA)
