= Kirkland Concours d'Elegance =

Coordinates: 47°39′24″N 122°12′26″W

The Kirkland Concours d'Elegance at America's Car Museum is an automotive charitable event which has raised approximately 1.5 million US dollars during its first nine years for uncompensated health care for children at Seattle Children's Hospital and Evergreen Hospital Medical Center. The event was established in 2003 and was held the first nine years of its existence at Carillon Point in Kirkland, Washington. In September 2012 the event moved to the LeMay America's Car Museum (ACM) in nearby Tacoma, and was held until 2013.

A Concours d'Elegance (French, literally "a competition of elegance") is an event open to both prewar and postwar collector cars in which they are judged for authenticity, function, history, and style. Classes are commonly arranged by type, marque (manufacturer), coachbuilder, country of origin, or time period. Judges select first-, second-, and third-place finishers for each class in the event, and the judges confer the "Best of Show" award on one car from the group of first-place winners. In addition, a group of honorary judges, individuals who have made significant contributions to the automotive industry or motorsports, award a number of subjective awards to recognize standout vehicles regardless of class ribbons, as well as memorial awards created to honor specific automotive industry personages. There were also junior judges made up of sixth- through ninth-graders from local schools.

== Best of Show winners by year ==
- 2003:
- 2004:
- 2005:
- 2006: 1937 Bugatti T-57 (shown by Petersen Automotive Museum)
- 2007: 1937 Talbot-Lago T150C SS Figoni et Falaschi coupe (shown by Jack Nethercutt II)
- 2008: 1938 Alfa Romeo 8C 2900B Coupe Touring Berlinetta (shown by Jon Shirley)
- 2009: 1939 Mercedes-Benz 540K Autobahn Kourier Coupe (shown by Arturo Keller)
- 2010: 1937 Delahaye 136M Figoni et Falaschi convertible (shown by Peter W.and Merle Mullin)
- 2011: 1911 Simplex
- 2012: 1933 Marmon V16 Convertible Coupe (shown by Aaron Weiss)
- 2013: 1933 Alfa Romeo 6C 1750 GS Figoni et Falaschi Coupe (shown by David and Adele Cohen)

== See also ==
- autoweek.com

== Nearby Concours d'Elegance ==
- Forest Grove Concours d'Elegance (Forest Grove, OR)
- Crescent Beach Concours d'Elegance (Blackie Spit Park, British Columbia)
