= Anse au Foulon =

Small cove of the Saint Lawrence River in Quebec City

Coordinates: 46°47′12″N 71°13′58″W

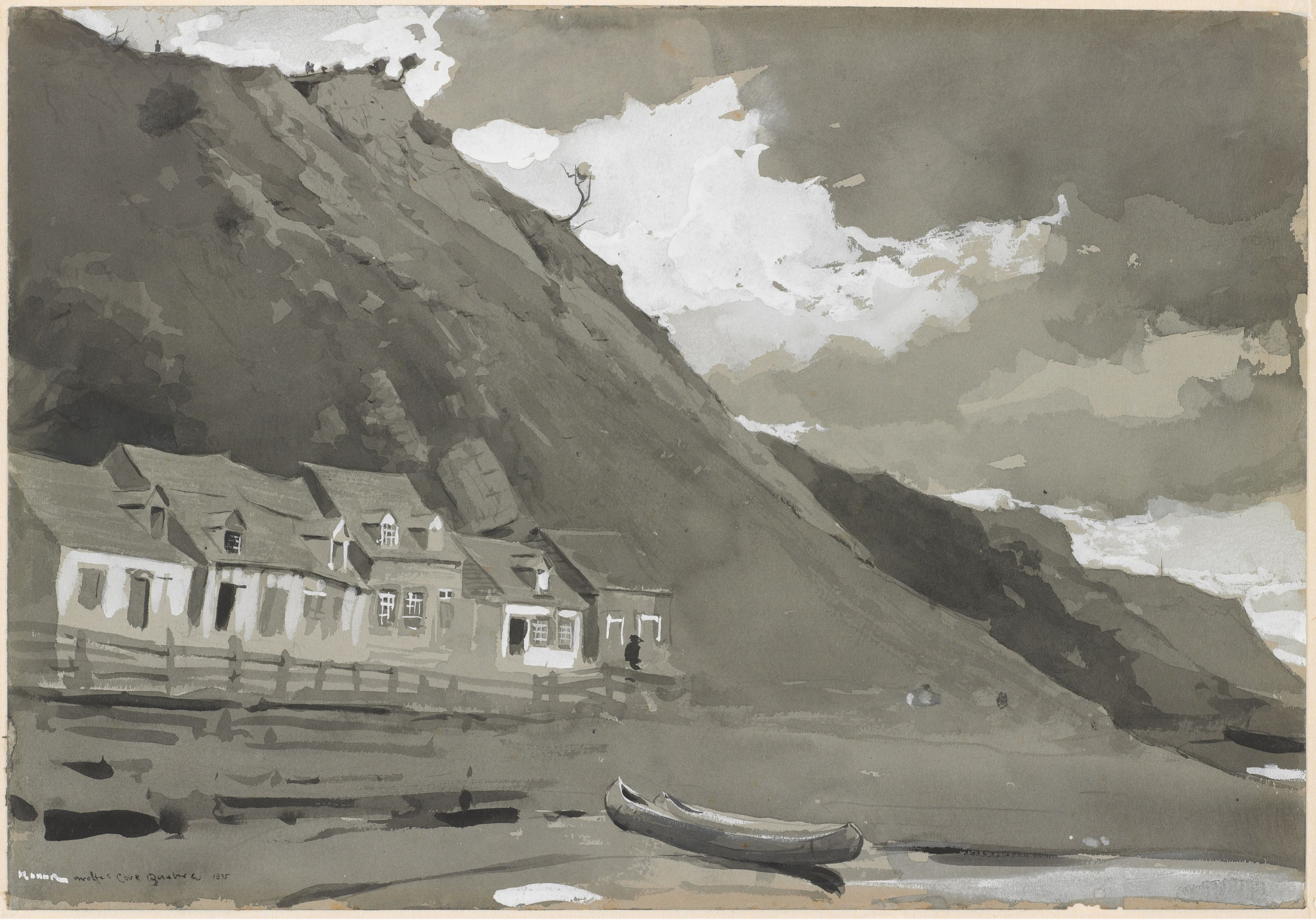
Wolfe's Cove, by Winslow Homer, 1895

Anse au Foulon (English: Fuller's Handle) is a small cove in Quebec, Canada. It was located about one and one-half miles above Quebec City, in the formerly independent town of Sillery, until 1 January 2002, as part of the 2000–06 municipal reorganization in Quebec. Since that date, Anse au Foulon and Sillery (reconstituted as a neighbourhood (quartier)) have been officially located in Quebec City.

The cove was known and referred to as Wolfe's Cove by Sillery's once-sizable English-speaking population. The first written reference to this appellation pertains to the event which took place at the cove and its cliff in 1759.

On the night of 12 September 1759, and early morning hours on the 13th, British forces commanded by James Wolfe landed at Anse au Foulon, prior to proceeding to the Plains of Abraham, where they engaged and defeated the French forces commanded by the Marquis de Montcalm, resulting in the occupation of Quebec City, and the subsequent signing of the Treaty of Paris (1763). The treaty marked Great Britain's victory over France and Spain, during the Seven Years' War, and stipulated France's ceding of New France east of the Mississippi River to Great Britain.

The etymology of the toponym originates from a fulling mill (French: foulon) that the Séminaire de Québec built in 1710, at the base of the cliff which met the cove. The mill's workers traveled on a path that became known as Foulon path (chemin du Foulon), as well as its plural (des Foulons). Despite the closure of the mill in 1734, the toponym of Foulon persisted. It was not until 1924, that the town of Sillery adopted the name of chemin du Foulon (also referred to a Cove Road) for the path turned into road.

On 5 December 1968, the Commission de toponymie du Québec recognized Wolfe's Cove as the topographic feature's official name; however, this decision was superseded on 17 August 1978, when the commission recognized Anse au Foulon as the official name.

== See also ==
- France in the Seven Years War
- Great Britain in the Seven Years War
