= Nethercutt–Richards family =

Nethercutt-Richards
- Family
- Country: United States
- Origin: Midwestern U.S.

The Nethercutt–Richards family is an American family known in the fields of business and cars. The family originated from the Midwestern U.S. in the 19th century and made their fortune primarily from the cosmetics industry in the early 20th century.

== Notable members ==
- Merle Norman (1887–1972) - founder of Merle Norman Cosmetics
- J.B. Nethercutt (1913–2004) - founder of The Nethercutt Collection
- Jack Nethercutt II (born 1936) - former racing driver
- Helen Richards-Nethercutt (born 1952) - autism philanthropist

== Business ==
Merle Norman founded Merle Norman Cosmetics in 1931 during the Great Depression by opening her first studio in Santa Monica, California. The company expanded to a retail chain and encompassed dozens of studio outlets across the contiguous United States, most of which were owned by women. The company was headquartered at the Merle Norman Building until the 1950s. The company further expanded to thousands of outlets throughout North America, Europe, and Asia becoming a centi-million dollar operation. In 1969, the company went public on the American Stock Exchange and sold 400,000 shares at $25. In 1974, the family bought back all the public stock and the company reverted to being privately held. They also owned a chemistry laboratory in the 1970s and a luxury restaurant named Boison's near the Las Vegas Strip in the later 20th century.

== Cars ==
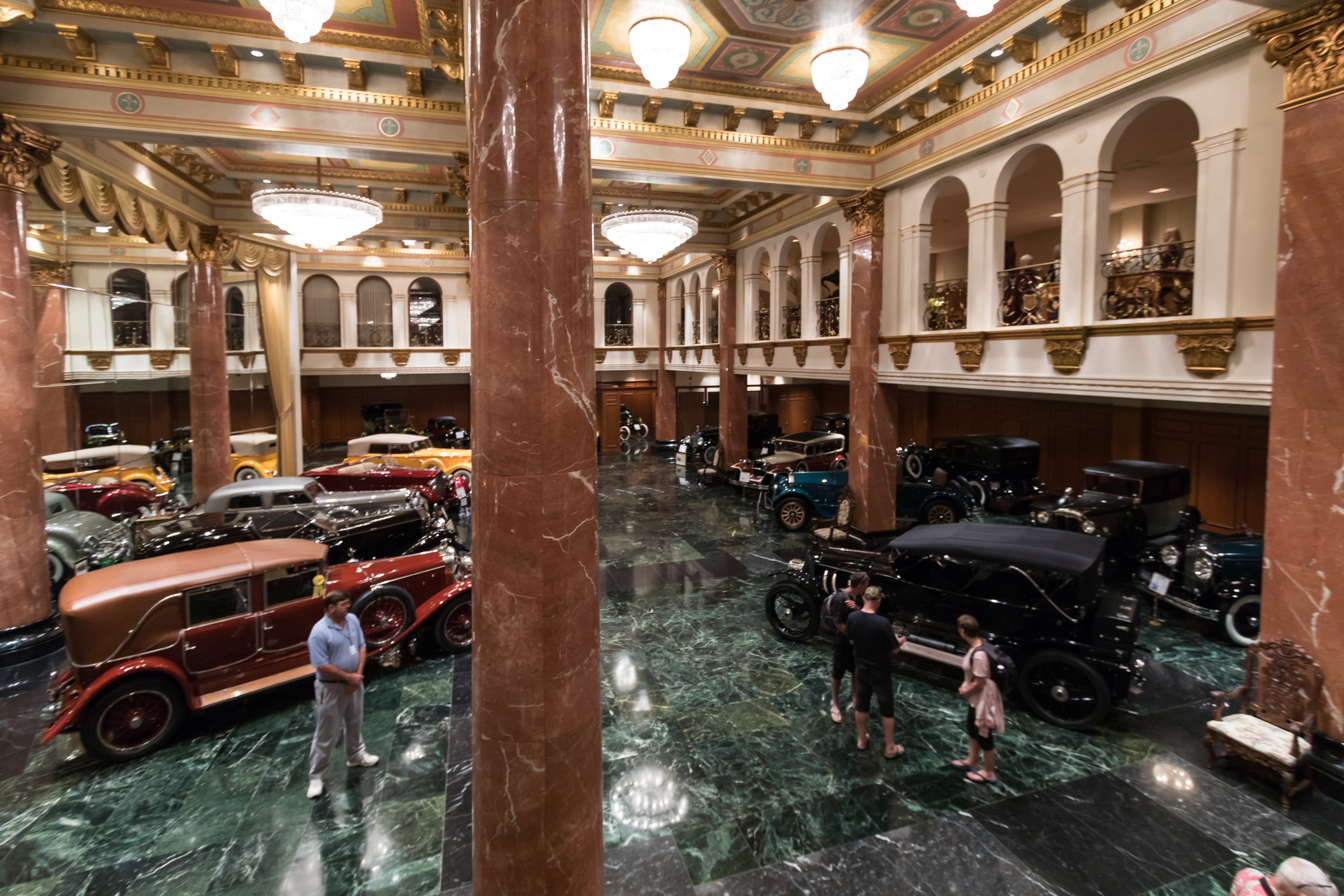
The Nethercutt Collection in 2017, formerly the estate of J.B. Nethercutt known as San Sylmar

The family has over 250 prestigious vehicles housed mostly at the 10 story-tall Nethercutt Collection museum, which J.B. Nethercutt founded in 1971 and was the namesake. It has been regarded as one of the greatest and most valuable car collections in the world. The car collection notably contains two of the most valuable cars in the world; the Bugatti Dubos and the Duesenberg Twenty Grand. Several cars from the collection have been used as the lead car carrying the grand marshal of the Rose Parade.

J.B. Nethercutt holds the most Best of Show titles at the Pebble Beach Concours d'Elegance with 6 victories and the Nethercutt Collection team holds the most Concours d'Elegance awards worldwide. Jack Nethercutt II raced professionally from 1957 to 1965 most notably in the World Sportscar Championship with Ferrari, where he was a part of their winning 1960 championship season.

== Philanthropy ==
Merle Norman donated several million to charities, medical institutions, veterans, and churches. In 1985, J.B. Nethercutt donated US$1 million to the town of Kenora, Canada for a new emergency medical department. In 1986, the family donated several million which led to the construction of the six-story Merle Norman Pavilion complex at the UCLA Medical Center, Santa Monica. In 2007, the Nethercutt Emergency Center was opened at the same hospital, with J.B. posthumously as the namesake. Helen Richards-Nethercutt has funded several autism charities, including the Exceptional Children's Foundation. They have donated to the University of Southern California, including for the construction of Merle Norman Stadium and the foundation of the USC Trojans beach volleyball team.

== Historic estates ==
- Merle Norman House (built 1935), Mediterranean Revival ocean view estate in Santa Monica, California that became a Santa Monica Historic Landmark.
- El Rancho Merlita (built 1950), 13-acre compound in Tucson, Arizona that was also used as a corporate retreat for Merle Norman Cosmetics executives, and later became a hotel.
- San Sylmar (built 1971), Art Deco tower estate in Sylmar, Los Angeles that was one of the largest houses in the United States at 60,000 square feet (5,600 m^{2}).
