= Merle Nethercutt Norman =

American makeup entrepreneur and chemist

Merle Norman
- Born: Merle Mozelle Nethercutt; January 15, 1887; Logansport, Indiana, U.S.
- Died: February 1, 1972 (aged 85); Sydney, Australia
- Education: University of Chicago
- Spouse: Andrew Gullickstead Norman (m. 1913; died 1959)
- Relatives: Nethercutt family

Merle Nethercutt Norman (January 15, 1887 – February 1, 1972) was an American cosmetics magnate, chemist, and philanthropist. She was the founder of Merle Norman Cosmetics and was one of the early business pioneers of franchising.

== Early life and education ==
Merle Mozelle Nethercutt was born in Logansport, Indiana. Her family later moved to South Bend, Indiana where she graduated high school. In high school she was a public speaker and musician. She attended a teachers' college and taught in the South Bend school system for several years. Nethercutt later enrolled in the University of Chicago to study chemistry.

In 1912 she met Andrew Norman Gullickstad, who worked in advertising. They married a year later and eventually changed their surname to Norman. They moved to Santa Monica, California with Merle's parents in 1920. Merle's nephew J.B. Nethercutt would also leave Indiana to live with the family and study chemistry at Caltech.

== Cosmetic career ==
During the late 1920s, Merle Norman with her knowledge of chemistry from college, would start creating homemade cosmetics in a makeshift laboratory in her Santa Monica estate's kitchen. Norman would give out free samples to her neighbors. She would then sell her products to local customers, with her nephew J.B. working as a peddler to deliver the products using grocery bags. She would create her "3 Steps to Beauty" line, which featured PowderBase, Cleansing Cream, and Miracol.

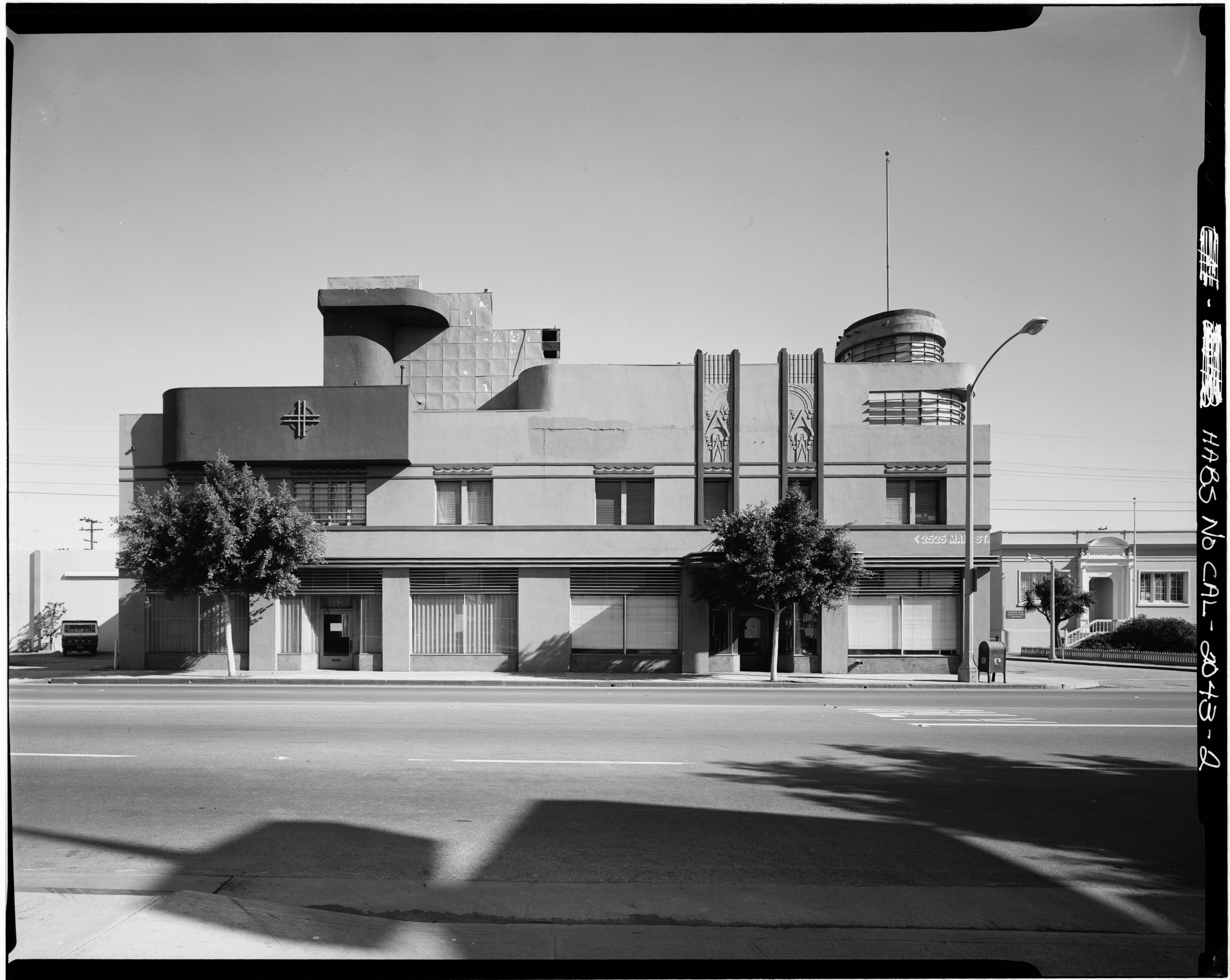
Merle Norman Building in Los Angeles in the 1930s

In 1931 during the depth of the Great Depression, Merle Norrman spent $150 to open a small local cosmetics studio named Merle Norman Cosmetics in downtown Santa Monica to sell their products more abroad. Norman would begin the "try before you buy" philosophy, letting her customers try on products for free. In the next couple of years women who were interested in the Merle Norman Cosmetics brand wanted to open their own studios throughout California, starting an early chain of franchises dubbed "studios." By 1934, the company had rapidly expanded to 94 independently owned franchises across the contiguous United States, with them predominantly being owned by women. in 1936 she moved the company to the Merle Norman Building.

During World War II she temporarily stopped cosmetic production and the company produced gun oil and camouflage sticks for the U.S. Military.

Over the next 30 years, Merle Norman Cosmetics expanded as a multi-million dollar cosmetic enterprise encompassing thousands of franchise studios throughout North America. In 1963, Norman would step down as chairman and hand down the company to her nephew, J.B. Nethercutt.

== Legacy ==
Norman has been credited of being ahead of her time, laying out the foundations for franchising before they were properly defined in modern business. Norman would be described as a pioneer entrepreneur and an inspiration for women of the time, with the large majority of Merle Norman Cosmetics franchise studios being owned independently by women nationwide by 1934. Her company was one of the few to gain an increasing success throughout the Great Depression.

Merle Norman Stadium at the University of Southern California and the $36 million six-story Merle Norman Pavilion at the UCLA Medical Center, Santa Monica were both named after her.

Connie O'Kelley's book Merle Nethercutt Norman: An American Story is a biography of Norman's life.

== Personal life ==
Norman and her husband Andrew Gullickstead had one child who died in miscarriage. Her nephew, J.B. would continue the family company line through his family's descendants, which included his son and Norman's grand-nephew, Jack Nethercutt II.

Merle Norman was friends with legendary MLB player Babe Ruth and sponsored his little League through her company over 15 years.

=== Estates ===
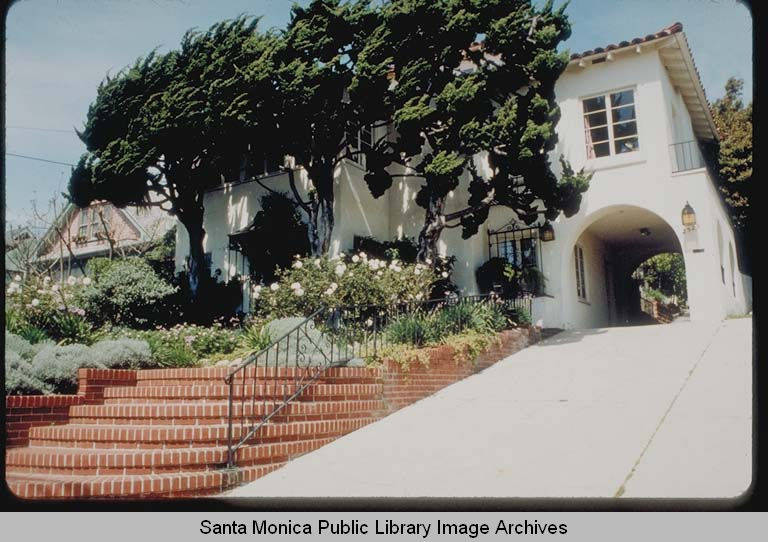
Merle Norman House

In 1936 Norman commissioned a custom Mediterranean-style mansion to be built in Santa Monica by architect Ellis Martin. It would later be known as the Merle Norman House and in 1996 was dedicated as a historic landmark in the City of Santa Monica.

In the 1950s Norman purchased several acres of land in Tucson, Arizona and commissioned a large ranch house compound named El Rancho Merlita, which became a vacation retreat for her friends and colleagues. The ranch house became a bed and breakfast in 2004.

=== Charities ===
Merle Norman through herself and her company donated several million to dozens of charities, churches, and veteran programs in the United States and Canada.

== Death ==
Merle Norman died on February 1, 1972, at the age of 85 in Sydney, Australia.
