= Merle Norman House =

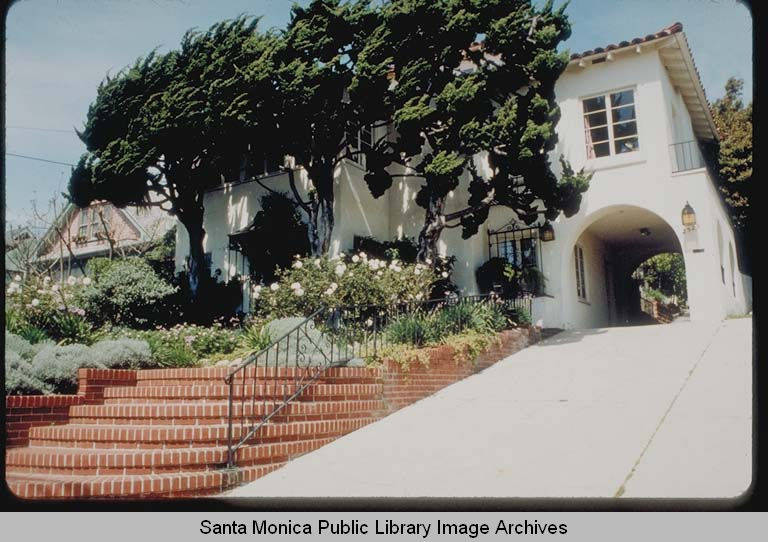
- The estate in 2001

- Location within the Los Angeles metropolitan area
- 34°0′13.172″N 118°28′57.507″W
- Location: Santa Monica, California

History
- Built: 1935

Site notes
- Architect: Ellis G. Martin
- Architectural style: Mediterranean Revival

Santa Monica Historic Landmark
- Designated: June 10, 1996
- Reference no.: 32

The Merle Norman House is an historic ocean view estate built for cosmetics magnate Merle Norman located at 2523 Third Street in Santa Monica, California. It was constructed during the Great Depression in 1935 with a mix of Mediterranean Revival and Art Deco designed by architect Ellis G. Martin.

The 4,722 square foot estate includes a sweeping staircase leads to the living room, which spans the front of the house. A dining room, a library/study room, a den, a breakfast room, four bedrooms and five bathrooms are among the living spaces. It also includes a guest room and courtyard. The master suite features Pacific Ocean views, a sitting room, two bathrooms and a circular dressing room.

The house was designated as Santa Monica Historic Landmark 32 on June 10, 1996. It sold in 2015 for $4.1 million.

== See also ==
- Merle Norman Building
- Merle Norman Cosmetics
