= Merle Norman Cosmetics =

American cosmetics company

Merle Norman Cosmetics Inc.
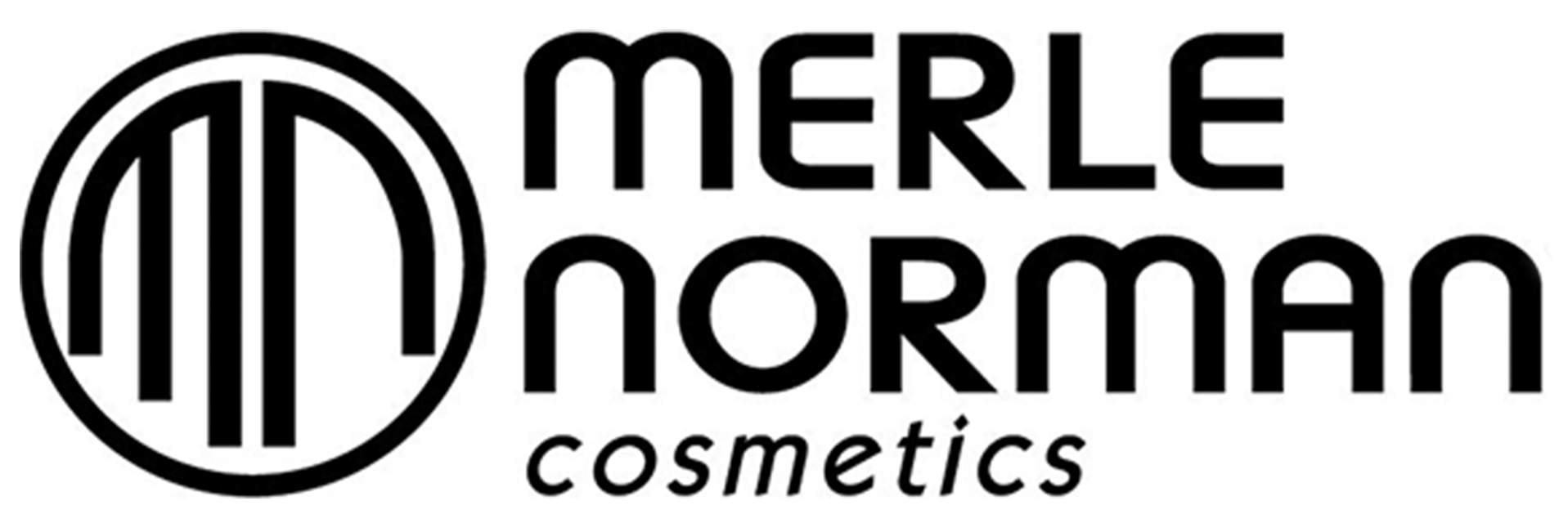

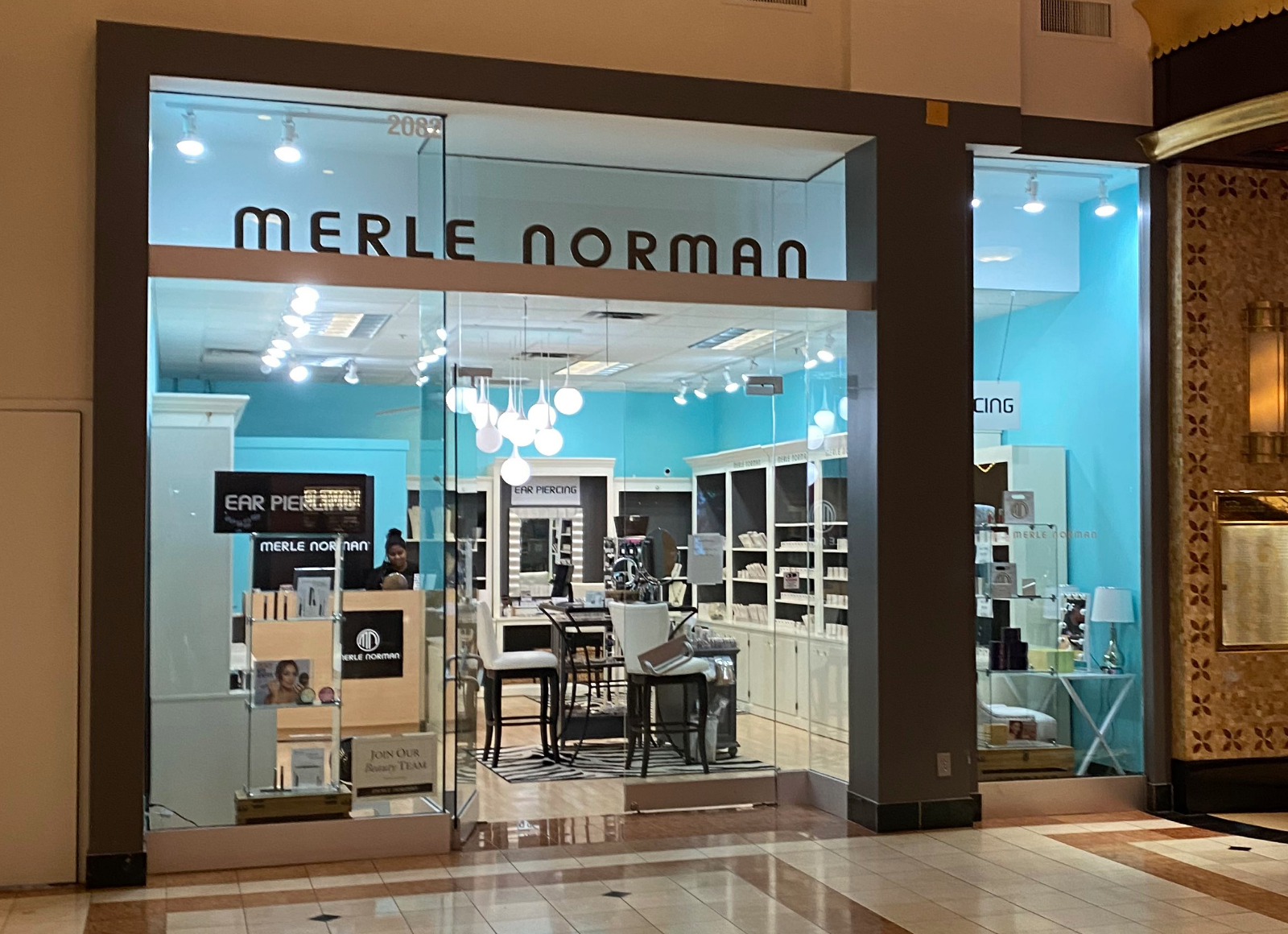
- Merle Norman studio in Raleigh
- Type: Private
- Industry: Cosmetics
- Founded: 1931; 95 years ago
- Founder: Merle Norman
- Headquarters: Los Angeles, California, U.S.
- Number of locations: 1,007 (2021)
- Area served: United States; Canada; Guatemala; Bahrain; United Arab Emirates; Hong Kong; Taiwan
- Key people: Jack Nethercutt II (Chairman & President)
- Products: Cosmetics; skin care; personal care
- Services: Day spa
- Revenue: US$100 million (2018)
- Website: www.merlenorman.com

Merle Norman Cosmetics Inc. or simply known as Merle Norman, is an American cosmetics company that manufactures skin care, personal care, and makeup products founded in 1931 by Merle Norman. The company sells its products through e-commerce and its beauty store studio franchises, along with operating day spas through its Merle Norman Spa brand. As of 2021 the company had 1,007 locations throughout 7 countries, primarily in North America.

== History ==
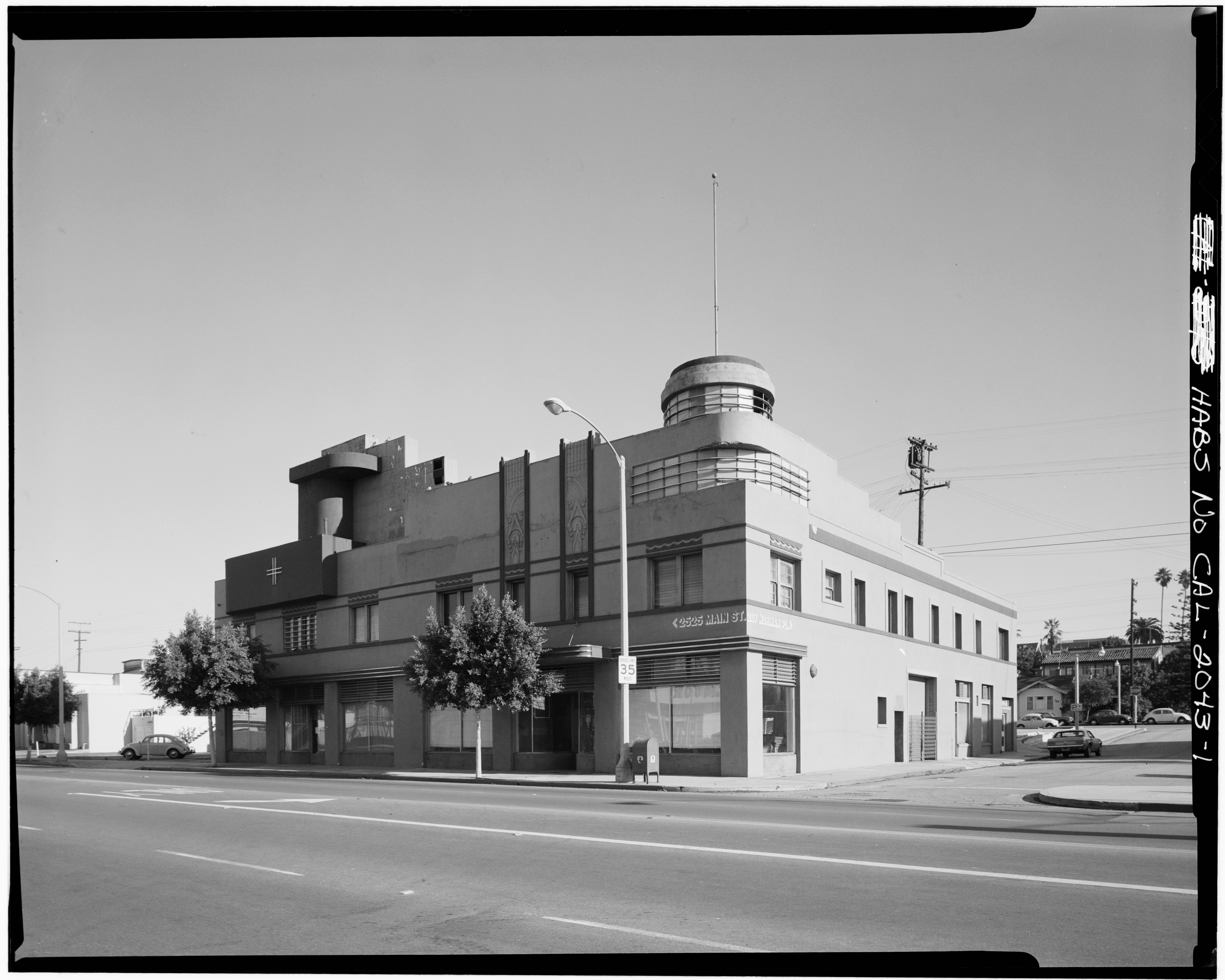
Merle Norman Building in the 1930s

Merle Norman, with her education in chemistry, started making makeshift cosmetic products in her home kitchen to sell to her neighbors while her nephew, J.B. Nethercutt, worked as the delivery peddler. Growing in local popularity, in 1931, she opened her first official cosmetics studio in Santa Monica for $150 during the Great Depression. By 1934, the company had expanded to dozens of independently owned studios across the contiguous United States which were predominately owned by women. In 1936, the company moved to its headquarters to the Merle Norman Building on Main Street. By the 1940s the company expanded overseas to Asia, marketing in Thailand. During the American involvement in World War II, the company produced gun oil and camouflage.

In 1963, Norman stepped down as chairman and passed down the company to J.B. Nethercutt. In 1969, the company changed to be publicly traded on the American Stock Exchange (AMEX). The company sold 400,000 shares at $25. The company opened secondary factory in Sylmar, Los Angeles in 1971, and a forward distribution center in Memphis, Tennessee for its East Coast studios in 1973. In 1974, the family bought back all the public stock due to a lack of demanded trading interest, and the company reverted to being privately held.

In the 1980s, Merle Norman was named one of the ten largest American cosmetic companies by People magazine. The company started its first national advertising campaign, having previously only used word-of-mouth marketing regionally, including being the primary sponsor of the 1981 Met Gala. The company experimentally expanded to Europe in 3 countries, but would leave the continent by the next decade. In 1999, the company redesigned its studios to have a common interior.

In 2004, Nethercutt passed the company down to his son, Jack Nethercutt II. In 2007, the company was ranked No. 21 in Entrepreneur magazine's Franchise 500. Merle Norman expanded to the Middle East by 2011. Later in the year, the company unveiled a new separate logo emblem with an updated wordmark along with a redesign of product packaging. From 2012 to 2019, the company had a decline of 269 studio units. In 2018, the company announced its beginning of day spa services to select studio outlets in the United States and Canada. In 2019, Merle Norman's products were available for purchase online through e-commerce. The company produced WHO hand sanitizer during the COVID-19 pandemic.

== Operations ==
Merle Norman is a privately held family owned company by the Nethercutt–Richards family. The corporate headquarters is located in Los Angeles, California. The company is a member of the Personal Care Products Council.

The company sells its products online and through its own retail franchise studios, nearly all of which are independently owned. The primary manufacturing plant and distribution center is located in Westchester, Los Angeles and is connected to the corporate headquarters. In 1971, a secondary plant was opened in Sylmar, Los Angeles which produces the containers and packaging for its products.

Merle Norman is certified by PETA as cruelty-free. The company uses non-vegan ingredients.

=== Merle Norman Spa ===
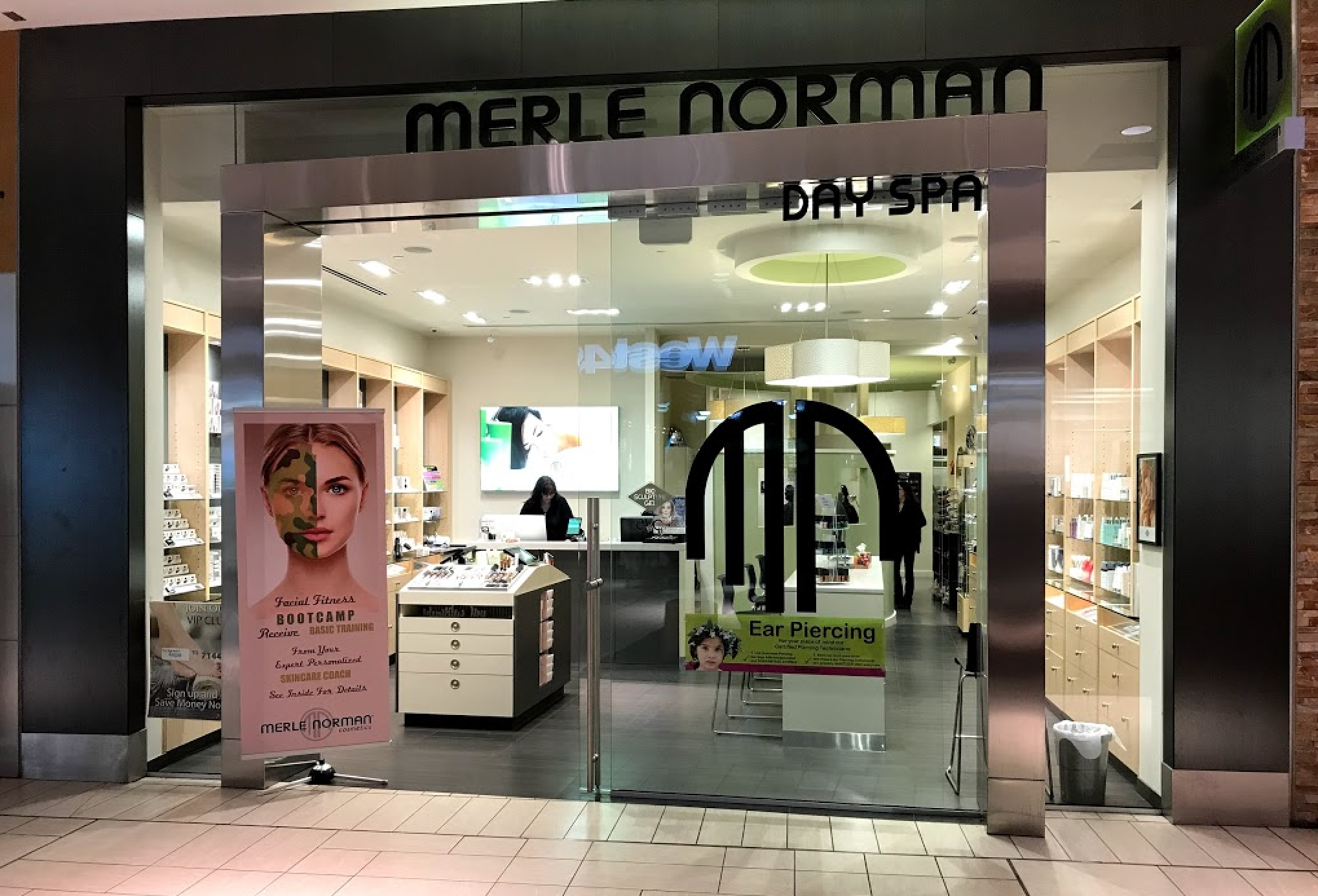
A Merle Norman Spa at the Chinook Centre in Calgary

Merle Norman Spas are select specialized outlets throughout the United States and Canada that offer day spa services, including facial treatments and massages from trained estheticians.

== Locations ==
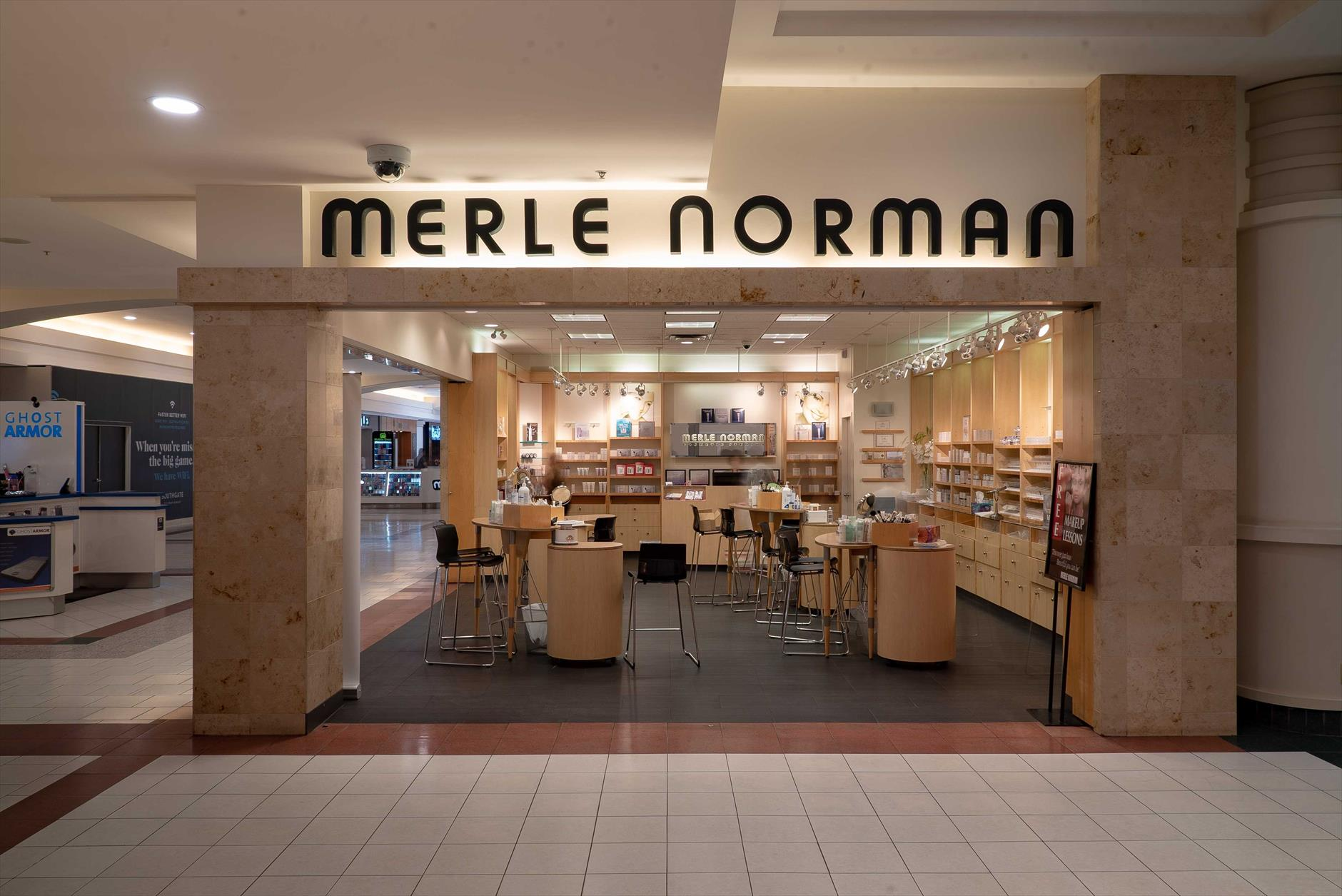
A Merle Norman studio in Southcentre Mall in Alberta

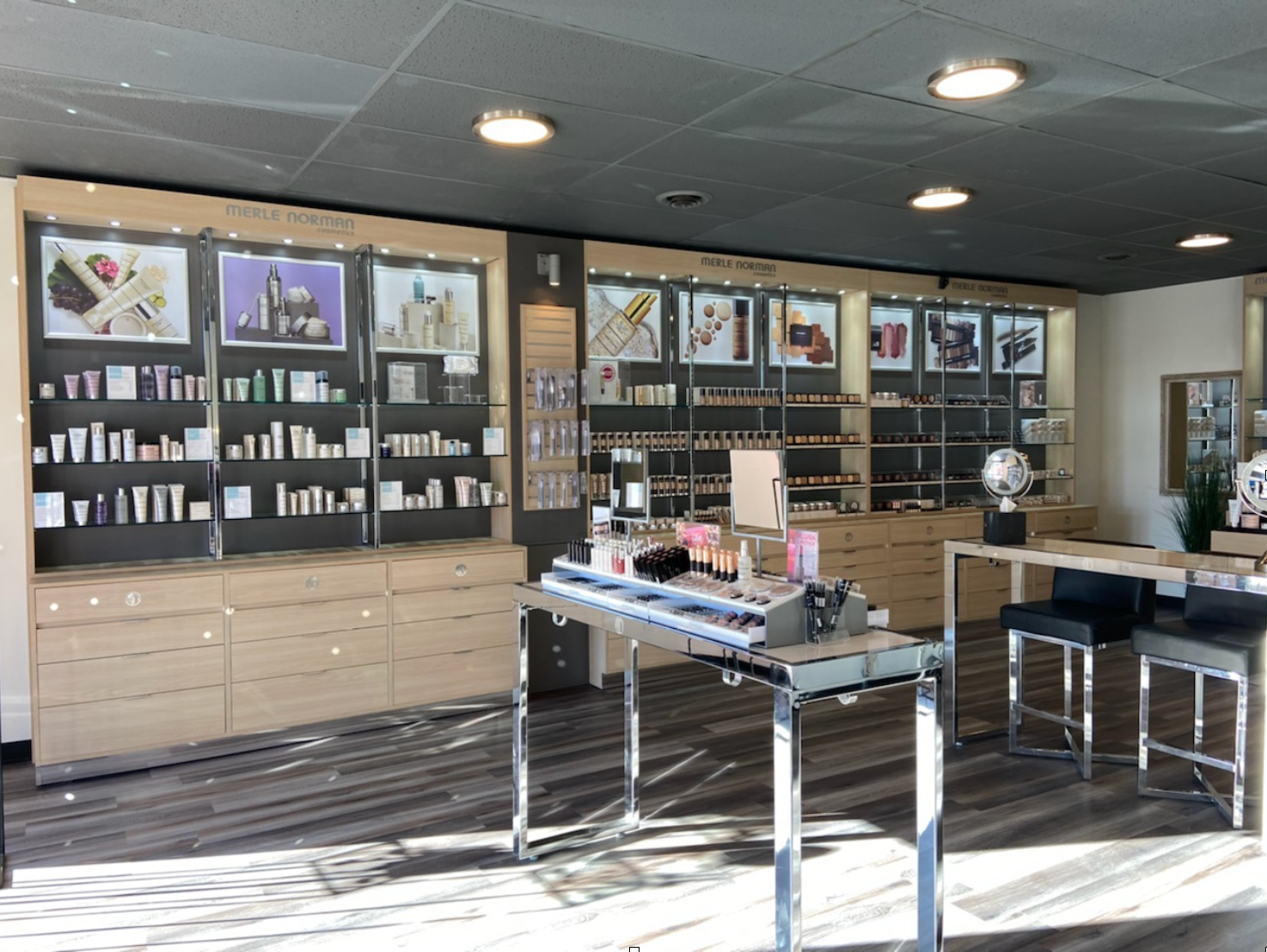
Studio in Colorado Springs, Colorado

Below is a list of current domestic and international studio outlets as of 2021, with there being 955 throughout 49 U.S. states and 52 locations throughout 8 Canadian Provinces and 5 countries abroad totaling 1,007.

=== U.S. and Canada ===
- Alabama
- Alaska
- Alberta
- Arizona
- Arkansas
- British Columbia
- California
- Colorado
- Connecticut
- Delaware
- Florida
- Georgia
- Idaho
- Illinois
- Indiana
- Iowa
- Kansas
- Kentucky
- Louisiana
- Maine
- Manitoba
- Maryland
- Massachusetts
- Michigan
- Minnesota
- Mississippi
- Missouri
- Montana
- Nebraska
- Nevada
- New Hampshire
- New Jersey
- New Mexico
- New York
- Newfoundland and Labrador
- North Carolina
- North Dakota
- Nova Scotia
- Ohio
- Oklahoma
- Ontario
- Oregon
- Pennsylvania
- Rhode Island
- Saskatchewan
- South Carolina
- South Dakota
- Tennessee
- Texas
- Utah
- Vermont
- Virginia
- Washington
- West Virginia
- Wisconsin
- Wyoming

=== International ===
- Guatemala
- United Arab Emirates
- Bahrain
- Taiwan
- Hong Kong

== Sponsorship ==
Merle Norman was the primary sponsor of the 1981 Met Gala with the event's theme of The Eighteenth-Century Woman.

The company sponsors the USC Trojans and in 2012 funded Merle Norman Stadium for the school's new USC Trojans women's beach volleyball program. The company sponsors the Arizona Cardinals Cheerleaders in the NFL.
