= Merle Norman Building =

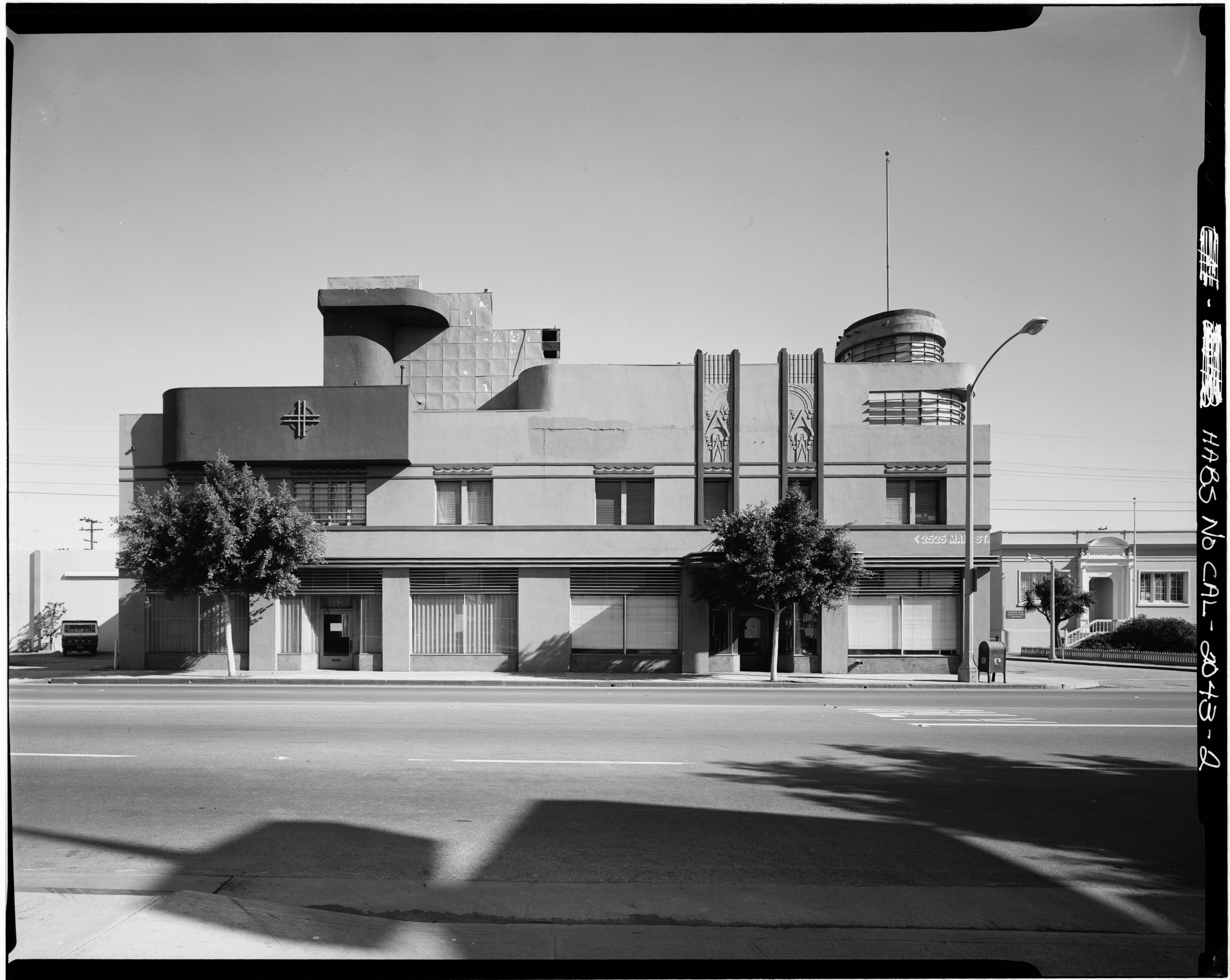
- Merle Norman Building

- Location within the Los Angeles metropolitan area
- 34°0′10.1118″N 118°29′2.958″W
- Location: Santa Monica, California

History
- Built: 1936

Site notes
- Architect: H.G. Thursby
- Architectural styles: Art deco Streamline Moderne

Santa Monica Historic Landmark
- Designated: November 11, 2002
- Reference no.: 44

The Merle Norman Building is a streamline moderne and art deco building in Santa Monica, California which was the former headquarters of Merle Norman Cosmetics located at 2525 Main Street. The building was designated as Santa Monica Historic Landmark #44 on June 10, November 11, 2002.

The building was constructed by H.G. Thursby in 1936 and towered above the low-rise commercial structures throughout Main Street during the height of the Great Depression, signaling an optimistic architectural design utilizing a mix of streamline moderne and art deco elements. The company utilized the building until 1952 when it moved to a larger complex in Westchester.

== See also ==
- Merle Norman
- Merle Norman Cosmetics
- Merle Norman House
