= Merle Norman Stadium =

Volleyball venue in Los Angeles, California

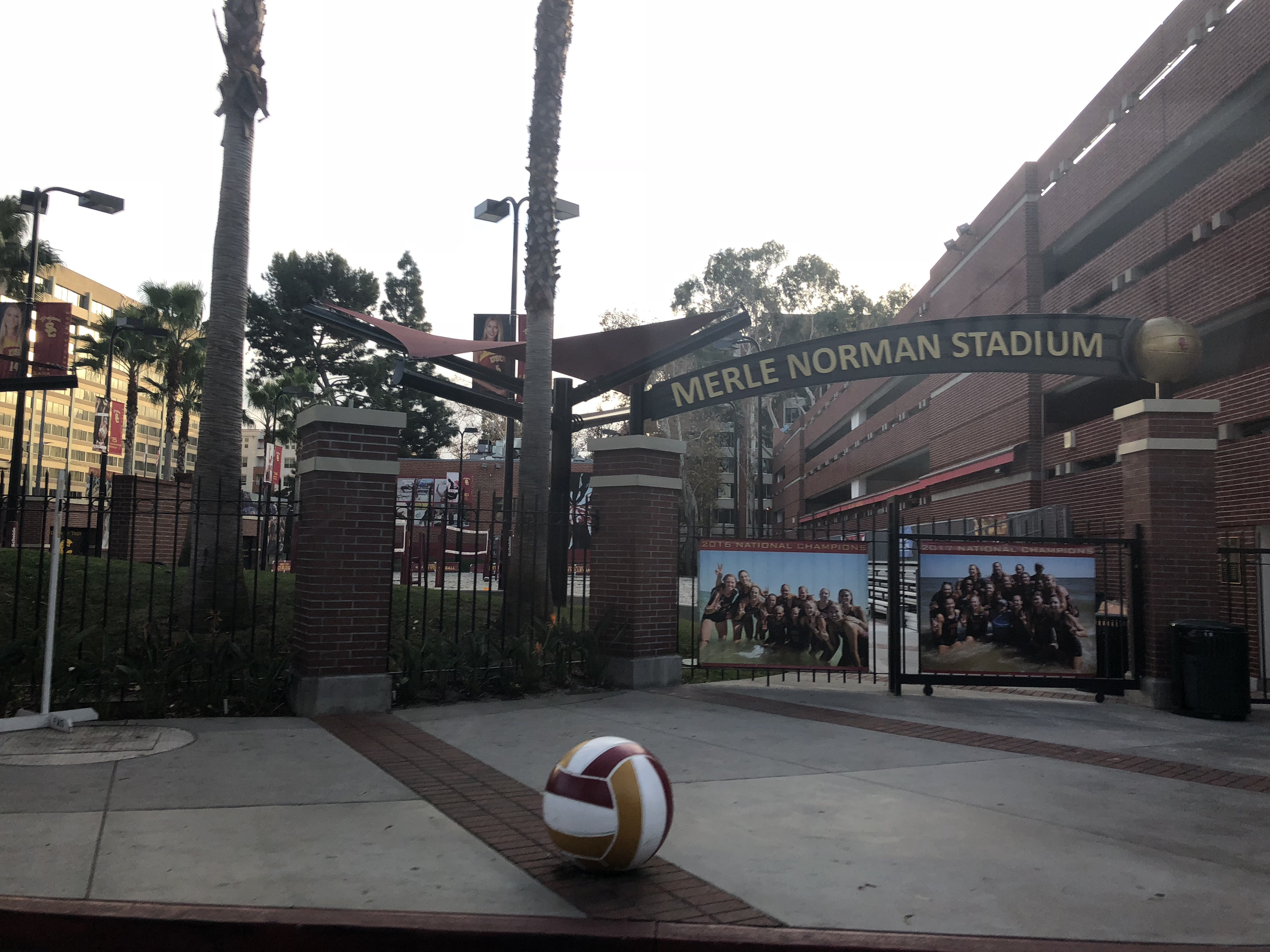
- Interactive map of Merle Norman Stadium
- Location: 3501 S. Figueroa St. Los Angeles
- Coordinates: 34.020195°N 118.281459°W
- Owner: University of Southern California
- Operator: University of Southern California

Construction
- Groundbreaking: 2012
- Opened: 2013

Tenants
- USC Trojans (NCAA) (2013–present)

Merle Norman Stadium is a beach volleyball facility located in Los Angeles, California, United States. The on-campus USC facility, built in 2013, serves as the home of the USC Trojans women's beach volleyball. The facility has three sand courts where USC plays its home matches and holds practices.

== History ==
Ground was broken to construct the venue in July 2012 from donations of several USC alumni, including Jack Nethercutt II. The stadium opened on March 7, 2013, and was named after Nethercutt's aunt, Merle Norman.

The Trojans went undefeated at the stadium in 2014, 2015, and 2017. As of July 2020, the Trojans are 34–4 at the stadium. As of 2023, the Trojans have won 5 NCAA Beach Volleyball National Championships since the NCAA program's foundation in 2016.

== Events ==
The women's beach volleyball team played their first dual match in the stadium on March 10, 2013, versus Loyola Marymount.

The 2016 Pac-12 Conference beach volleyball championships were held at the stadium, which the USC Trojans won.

== Gallery ==
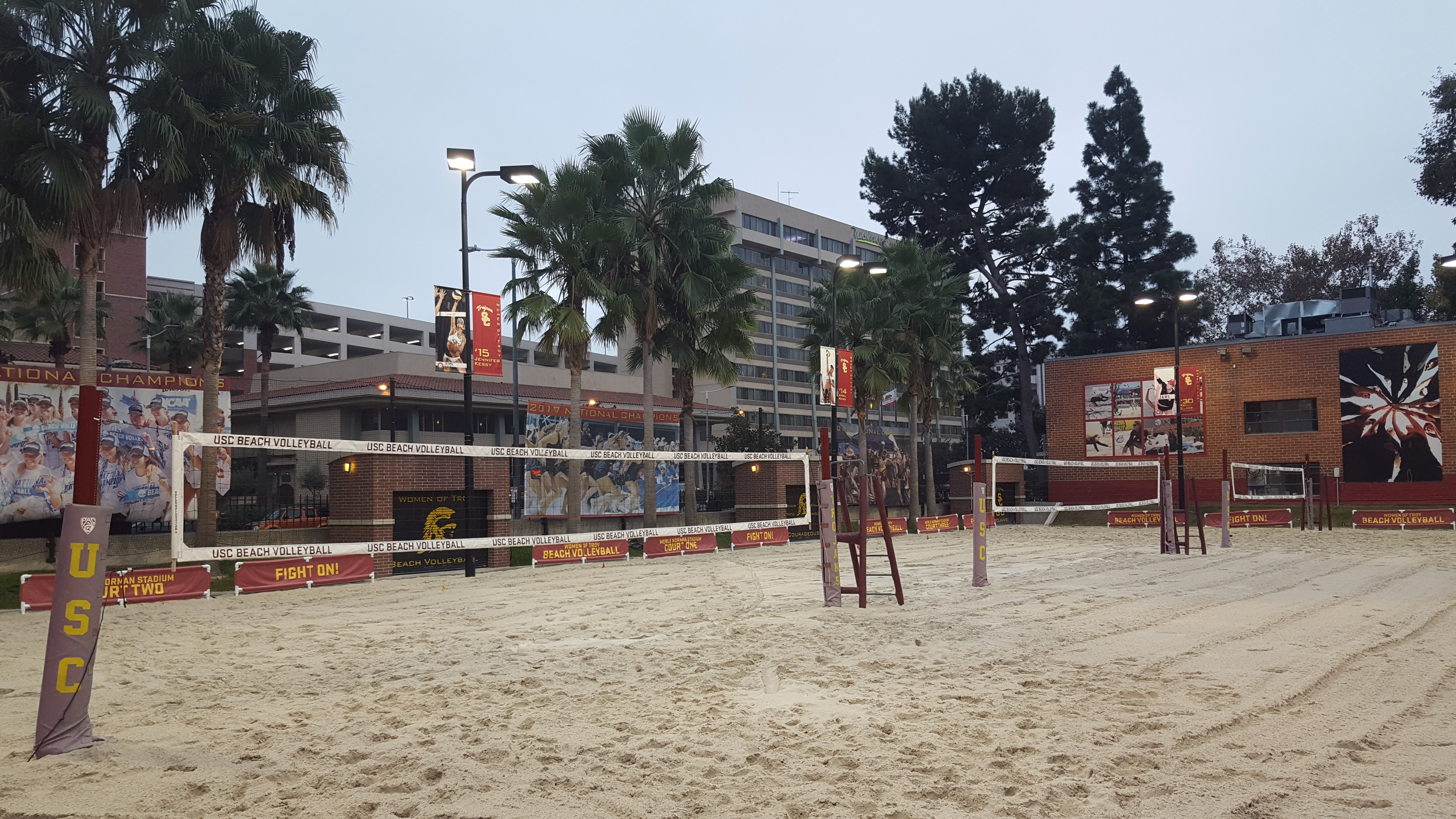
The three sand courts

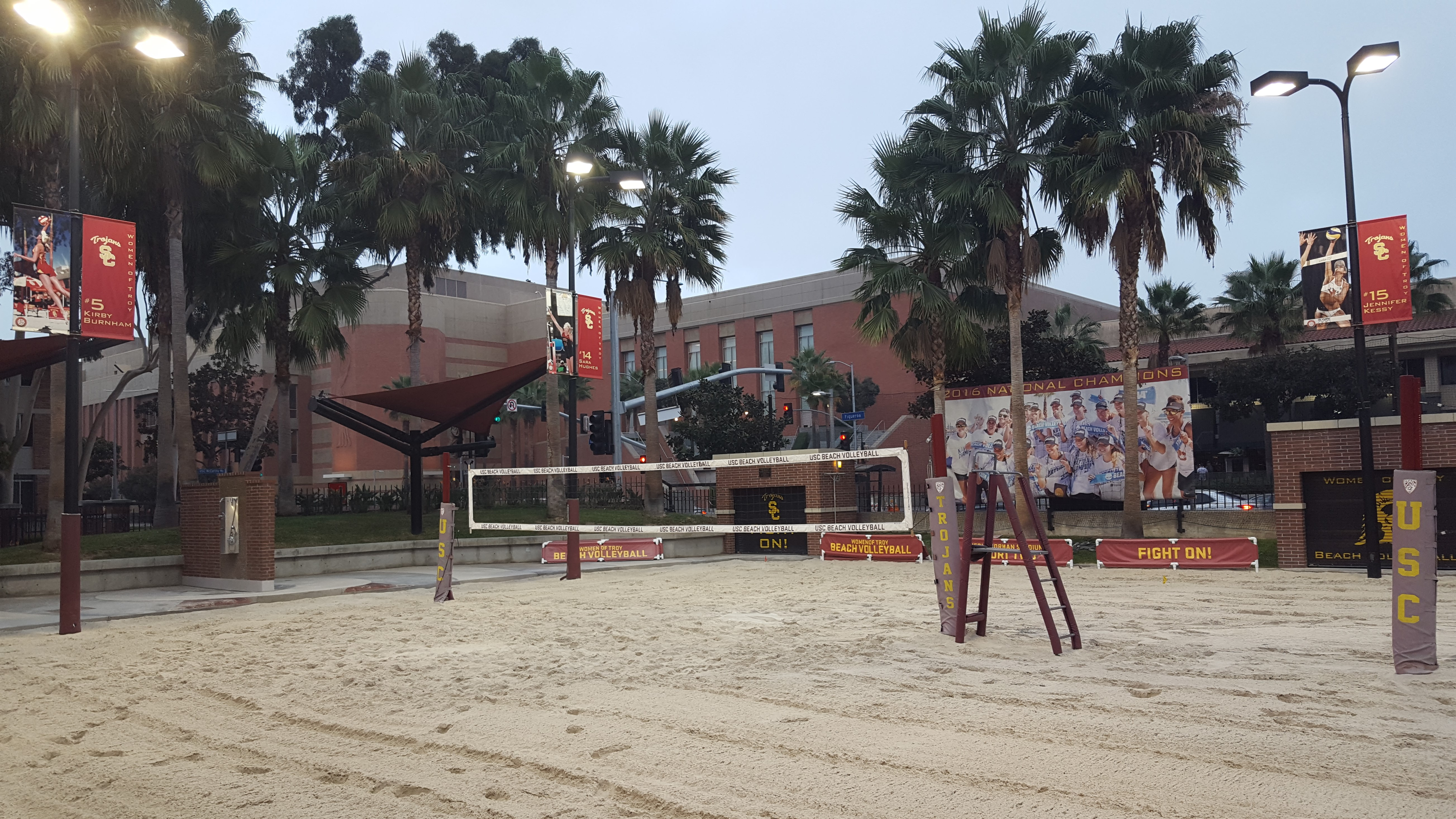
Merle Norman Stadium with the Galen Center in background

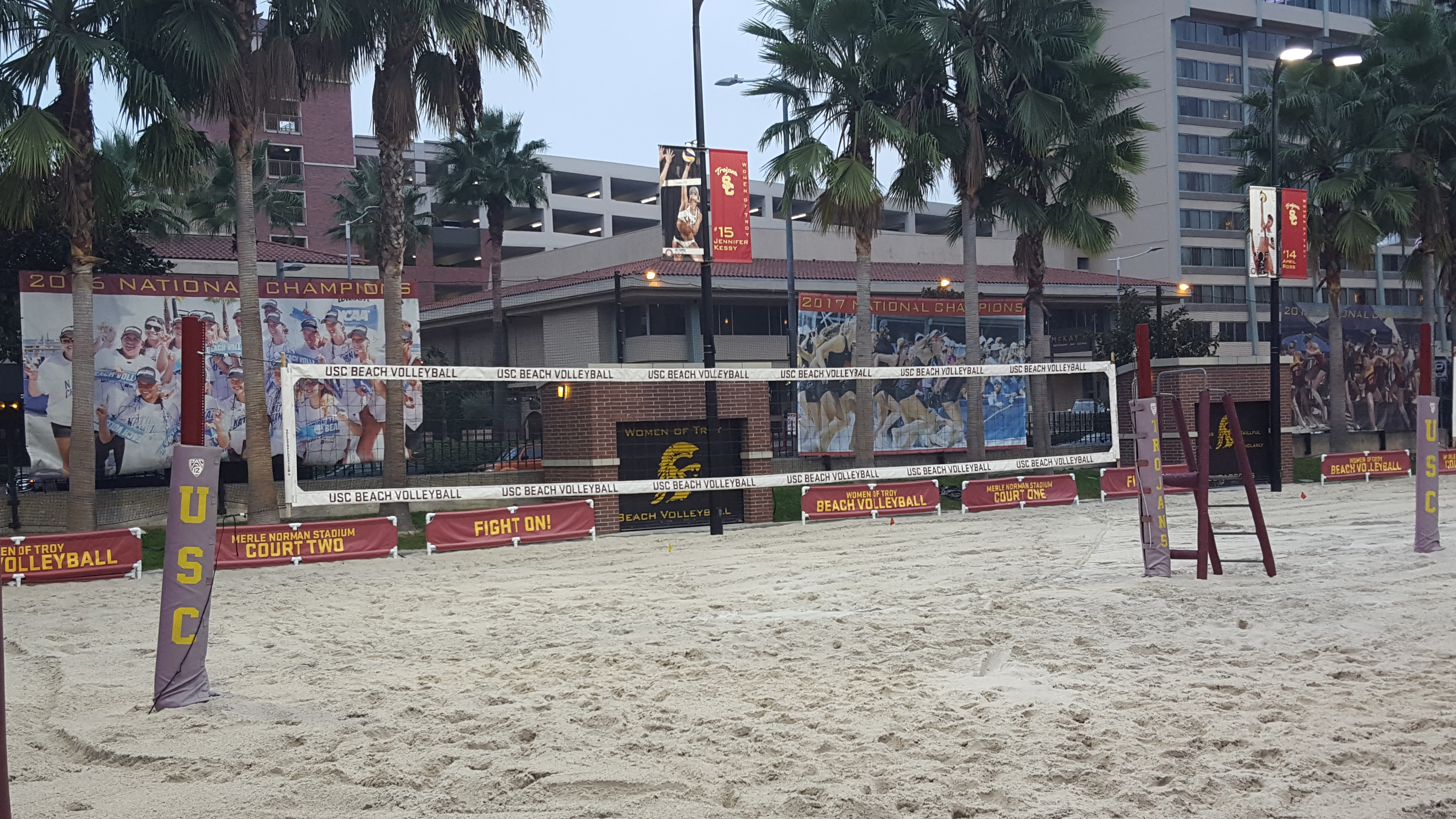
Merle Norman Stadium sand court

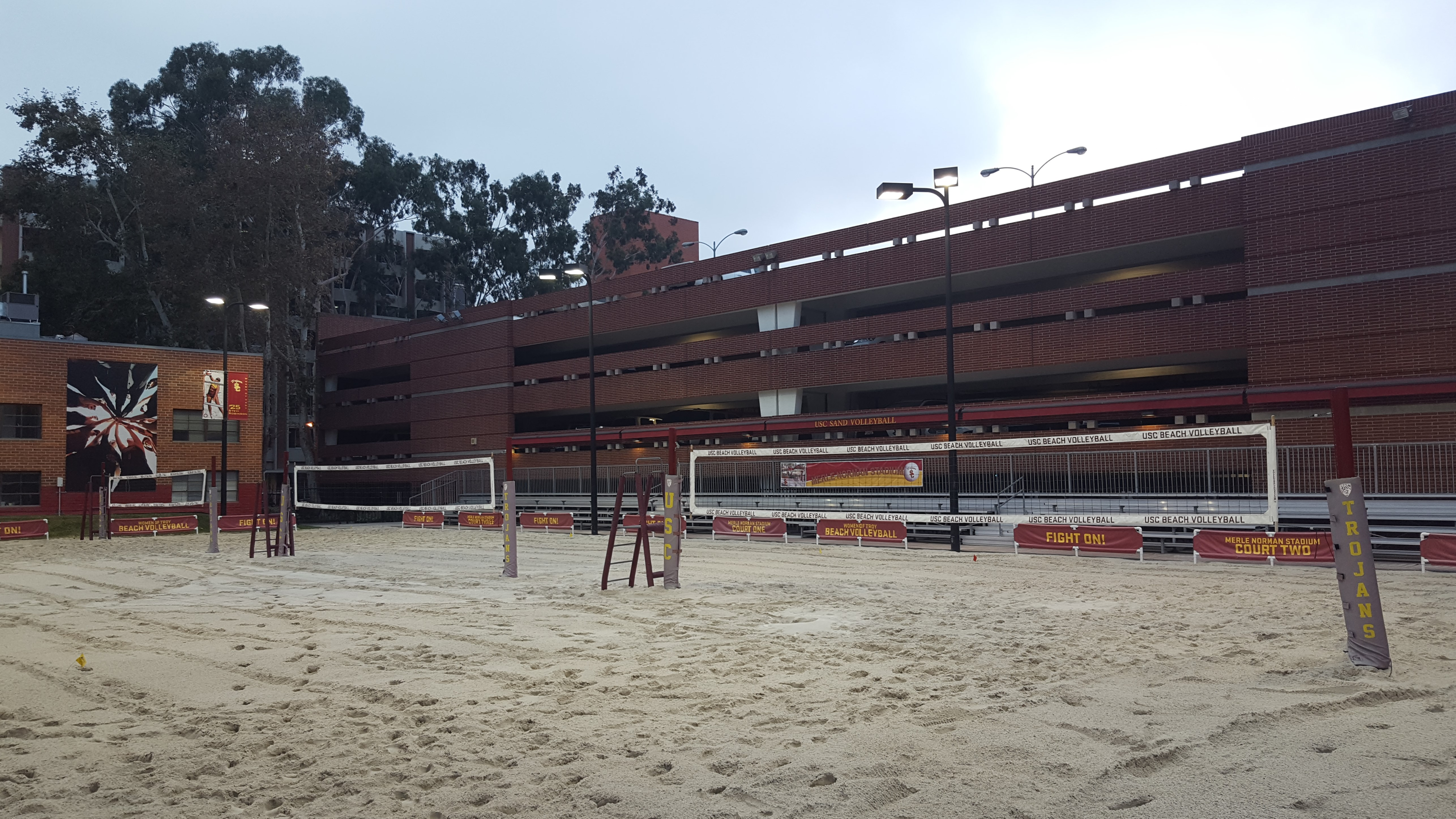
Merle Norman Stadium bleachers

== See also ==
- USC Trojans
- Merle Norman
