= Left Hand Creek (Colorado) =

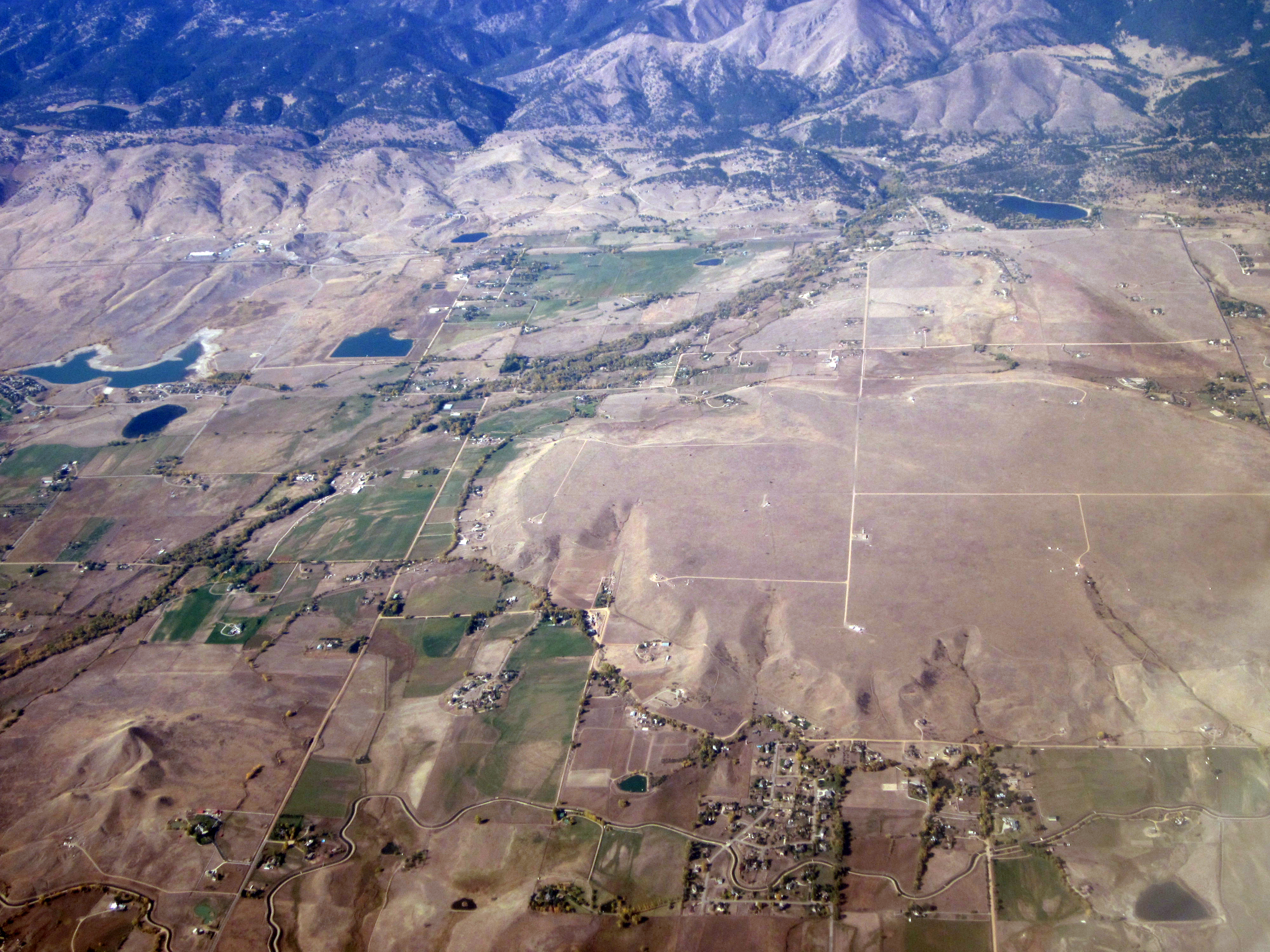
- Left Hand Creek and Canyon. Aerial photo by Doc Searls

Physical characteristics
- Source
  - coordinates: 40°04′00″N 105°34′21″W
- Mouth
  - location: Confluence with Saint Vrain
  - coordinates: 40°09′18″N 105°05′15″W
  - elevation: 4,924 ft (1,501 m)

Basin features
- Progression: Saint Vrain—South Platte—Platte— Missouri—Mississippi

Left Hand Creek is a tributary of Saint Vrain Creek, approximately 33.9 miles (54.6 km) long, in Boulder County, Colorado in the United States. The creek drains a section of the foothills of the Front Range northwest of Boulder, descending from the mountains in a steep canyon, known as Left Hand Canyon. Left Hand Creek issues from Left Hand Park Reservoir along the north flank of Niwot Mountain. Flowing through a steep gorge to the East, passing below Ward (which sits roughly at the head of the canyon). It emerges from the foothills North of Boulder and crosses ranch lands the Colorado Piedmont, passing north of Niwot and joining St. Vrain Creek on the South edge of Longmont.

Lower Left Hand canyon is a popular destination for road biking, hiking, whitewater kayaking and rock climbing. It contains several City of Boulder Open Space parks along the Boulder County road that ascends into the canyon from U.S. Highway 36 north of Boulder. The canyon rims provide habitat for raptors and are seasonally closed to rock climbing during the late winter and early spring during nesting season.

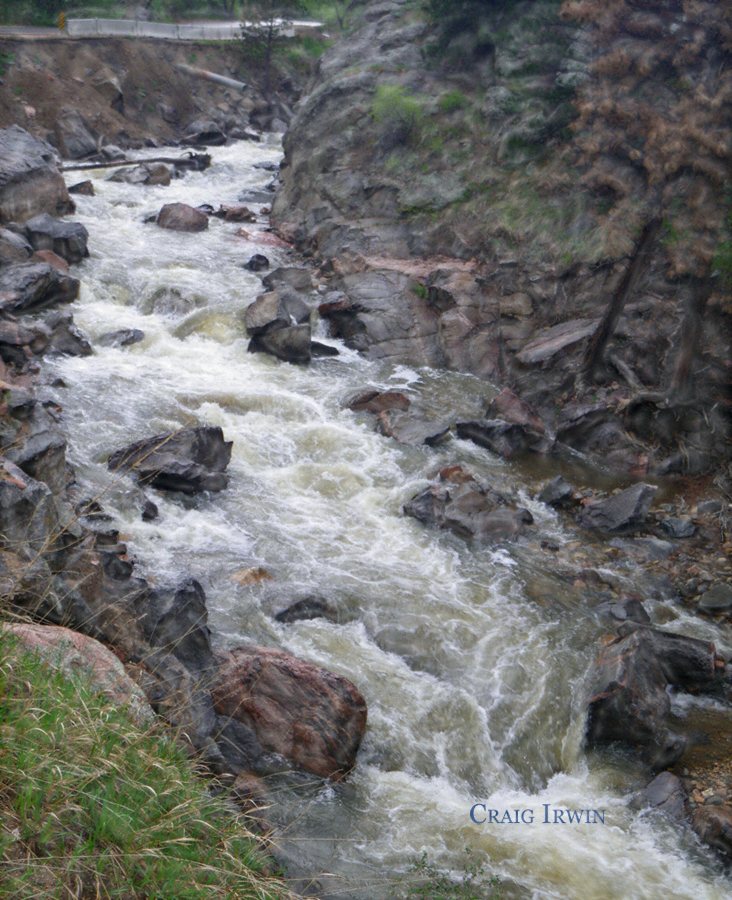
Left Hand Creek, NW of Boulder Colorado

The creek was named for Chief Left Hand of the Arapaho Indians. In 1859, during the Colorado Gold Rush, the canyon was the site of an early discovery of gold at Gold Hill located on a side gully approximately halfway up the canyon.

Left Hand Creek experienced a significant flood event in September 2013. This flood killed one resident of Jamestown in a debris flow from an adjacent ravine in the town. The flood of September 2013 considerably redistributed stream sediment and re-channelized the stream bed in places. Mitigation and recovery efforts in the town of Jamestown and for all Left Hand canyon residents is ongoing in 2017. Lefthand Watershed Oversight Group, a nonprofit watershed organization based in Boulder County, works to assess, protect, and restore the quality of the Left Hand Creek Watershed.

An obscure whitewater kayak run until 2000, Left Hand Canyon was first run in 1998 by Brook Aitken, Chris McEniry, and Craig D. Irwin. The whitewater kayakers first descended the Class V mini-gorge by entering through a small culvert passing under Left Hand Canyon Drive and beginning a tight and snaking boulder garden entrance through a cascade along the road. The mini gorge is below the roadway of Left Hand Canyon and is frequently choked with woody debris. The Left Hand Creek kayak run is short and full of action.

The City of Boulder Mountain Parks and Open Space has one parking facility at Buckingham Park.

== See also ==
- List of rivers of Colorado
- 2013 Colorado floods
