= Florence Molloy and Mabel MacLeay =

Florence Hayden Cowie Molloy
- Born: November 1878; Syracuse, NY
- Died: 1951; Boulder, Colorado
- Occupations: Taxi driver, resort owner
- Known for: Ran the Molloy-MacLeay taxicab company in Boulder, Colorado
- Spouse: Thomas J. Molloy
- Children: Mary and Jane Molloy
- Parent(s): William Cowie and Sarah H. Cowie

Mabel Nye MacLeay
- Born: 1883; Pendleton, Oregon
- Died: 1950 (aged 66–67); Boulder, Colorado
- Occupations: Taxi driver, resort owner
- Known for: Ran the Molloy-MacLeay taxicab company in Boulder, Colorado
- Spouse: Lachlan MacLeay
- Children: Donald MacLeay

Florence C. Molloy (1878 - 1951) and Mabel N. MacLeay (1883 - 1950) were American businesswomen who ran the Molloy-MacLeay taxicab company in Boulder, Colorado (about 1916 - 1926).

== Florence C. Molloy ==
Florence Hayden Cowie Molloy was born in November 1878 in Syracuse, New York to William Cowie of Scotland and Sarah H. Cowie of New York. She had at least one sister, Isabella Brillinger (née Cowie). Florence's father William was at one time the mayor of Syracuse. On February 5, 1908, Florence Cowie married Thomas J. Molloy (1877 - death date unknown) in Syracuse, New York and they subsequently had two daughters: Mary (1909 - death date unknown) and Jane Molloy (1911 - death date unknown).

Florence and Thomas raised mules on the Molloy family farm in Onondaga County, New York until 1912. In 1914 he transferred his interest in the property to Florence. She sold the property in 1920, but continued to hold the mortgage, and in 1935 she foreclosed on the buyer. In 1942 she sold the property to the U.S. government to build Mattydale Army Air Base, now Hancock Field.

The timing of the end of Florence's and Thomas's relationship is unclear. By 1918, Florence Molloy had moved with her daughters to Boulder, Colorado and was operating the Molloy-MacLeay taxicab company with Mabel N. MacLeay. The 1920 United States Census listed Florence as divorced, but the 1940 U.S. Census listed her as widowed.

== Mabel N. MacLeay ==
Mabel Nye MacLeay was born in 1883 in Pendleton, Oregon. Little is known of Mabel's early life. Mabel married Lachlan MacLeay in 1903 and they had a son Donald MacLeay (December 27, 1909 - October 18, 1994) while residing in Tacoma, Washington. By 1915, the MacLeays were residents of Syracuse, NY where Lachlan was serving as the Secretary of the Chamber of Commerce. Similar to Florence and Thomas, the end of Mabel's and Lachlan's relationship is unclear. In 1920, Mabel was noted in the U.S. Census as married, but living in Boulder, not with Lachlan, and operating the taxi company. The 1930 Census lists MacLeay as divorced and living with Molloy in the historic Squires-Tourellot house at 1019 Spruce Street, Boulder, Colorado, which also happens to be the oldest remaining house in Boulder, and working as a resort manager, but in 1940, she is listed as widowed.

== Molloy-MacLeay Taxicab Company ==
=== Early years ===
Molloy and MacLeay met in Syracuse before relocating to Boulder in 1916 and starting their taxi service. Based on personal accounts, the women were opposites with Molloy being over six feet tall and, “a great big masculine woman,” and MacLeay being petite and ladylike. The service began sometime during the years of World War I when the man operating the only service in Boulder, Colorado, was drafted. The service started with a single five passenger Cadillac 8 which Molloy used to drive friends. However, the business began to grow during the 1918 Spanish flu when the company volunteered with the Red Cross to transport medical professionals and supplies to the mountain towns and serve in funeral processions. During the epidemic, the 38-year-old Molloy was called on to fill in for an undertaker when his hearse could not traverse the mountain roads to pick up a flu victim. She initially refused, saying her car was out of order, but the undertaker demanded she, “Take it to the garage and get another car!” This was a turning point in the business as the job showed Molloy that no trip was too difficult to handle.

The service expanded from driving friends to providing scenic tours to clients using an additional seven-passenger Pierce Arrow. The charge was $7.00 per day per passenger for a round trip to Estes Park from Boulder or a circular route from Boulder to Nederland, Rollinsville, Idaho Springs, Lookout Mountain, and back to Boulder. They drove with the idea that sightseeing trips should be leisurely and not hurried. To further increase their clientele, the women expanded into city transportation and added a third car (a Packard) as well as a male driver. Eventually the company expanded to eight cars.

=== Peak years ===
By 1922, the Molloy-MacLeay taxicab company was operating from the Hotel Boulderado and rides across Boulder cost $0.25. The service was operating during Prohibition in the United States and the women would not pick up intoxicated passengers or transport liquor. The service catered to a variety of clientele, but became the go-to driving service for the female students of the University of Colorado at Boulder. The students’ parents would hire Molloy and MacLeay to act as both drivers and chaperones, especially as Molloy and MacLeay were much less expensive than the usual driver-plus-chaperone arrangement for longer trips. In a 1986 interview with one of the service's patrons, CU student Helen Carpenter, Carpenter said, “My gang of girls went everywhere with Mrs. Molloy. She took us to football games and to Estes Park for dinner." Additionally, the service was used by Jean Sherwood's “bluebirds,” working women from Chicago who vacationed at Bluebird Cottage in Boulder through the Bluebird Association (or Chicago Holiday Association). Molloy and MacLeay were also a favorite for funerals and received referrals from a local doctor. Two of their high-profile patrons were attorney Clarence Darrow and opera singer Madame Ernestine Schumann-Heink. Upon hearing the fare for her trip, Madame Schumann-Heink declared, “You deserve more. Your charge is so reasonable! Everywhere else, they try to hold me up. I am glad to help a sister,” and then paid $5.00. According to Molloy and MacLeay, “taxi driving is a safe and sane occupation for any woman who has coolness, courage, and a thorough knowledge of how to operate a car."

Despite their success, Molloy and MacLeay had to overcome the prejudiced opinion that women are not good drivers. Both women maintained “100 percent records” and only experienced two breakdowns in the 1921 season. They were noted for, “keeping their cars in such shape that breakdowns don’t occur."

=== Opposition and sale ===
During the peak years of Molloy's and MacLeay's service, theirs was not the only taxi business in town, and the success of their business led to upset among the male taxi drivers in Boulder. This discord only increased in 1926 when Molloy and MacLeay obtained a contract with Union Pacific Railroad for the exclusive rights to solicit passengers from the Colorado & Southern Railway passenger trains at the Boulder depot. The other taxi owners in Boulder subsequently lobbied for the passage of strict solicitation regulations, which became city ordinance 1169.

In June 1926, three taxi drivers, E.W. O’Neal, Ray Hall, and Seth Armstead filed a complaint against Molloy and MacLeay claiming they had violated the new city ordinance by soliciting business at the Union station platform. Molloy pleaded not guilty, and was supported by the station agent, J.P. Colstadt, and the secretary-manager of Bluebird Cottage, Emma Tracy, who said that though Molloy-MacLeay taxi has a contract with the Bluebirds, Bluebirds were not compelled to use the service. Nonetheless, Judge Linda Lee ordered the Molloy-MacLeay taxi stand removed from the station. According to letters written by Molloy and MacLeay to friends in Syracuse, NY, the women were also receiving threats from the Ku Klux Klan calling for them to close their business. As a result of the regulations, litigation, and threats, the Daily Camera announced on June 19, 1926, that Molloy and MacLeay had sold the Molloy-MacLeay taxicab company to the Yellow Cab company, but would continue Molloy Scenic Tours outside of Boulder city limits and continue a one-year lease to the Bluebirds.

== Double M Ranch ==
After the closure of the taxi service, the women opened the Double M dude ranch (or M&M ranch, then Trojan Ranch, and now the Colorado Mountain Ranch) in Gold Hill, Colorado. The Syracuse Herald described the Double M as offering, “all the attractions of the open spaces of the West sufficiently tempered with luxuries to meet the requirement of Easterners."

The ranch operated until World War II when it was sold in 1941 and Molloy and MacLeay relocated to Sunset Ranch at 2801 Baseline Road. They then sold Sunset Ranch in 1945 to move to the Loyal King home at 1200 28th Street.

== Death ==
Mabel MacLeay died in 1950 and Florence Molloy died in 1951.
