= Pierce Silver Arrow =

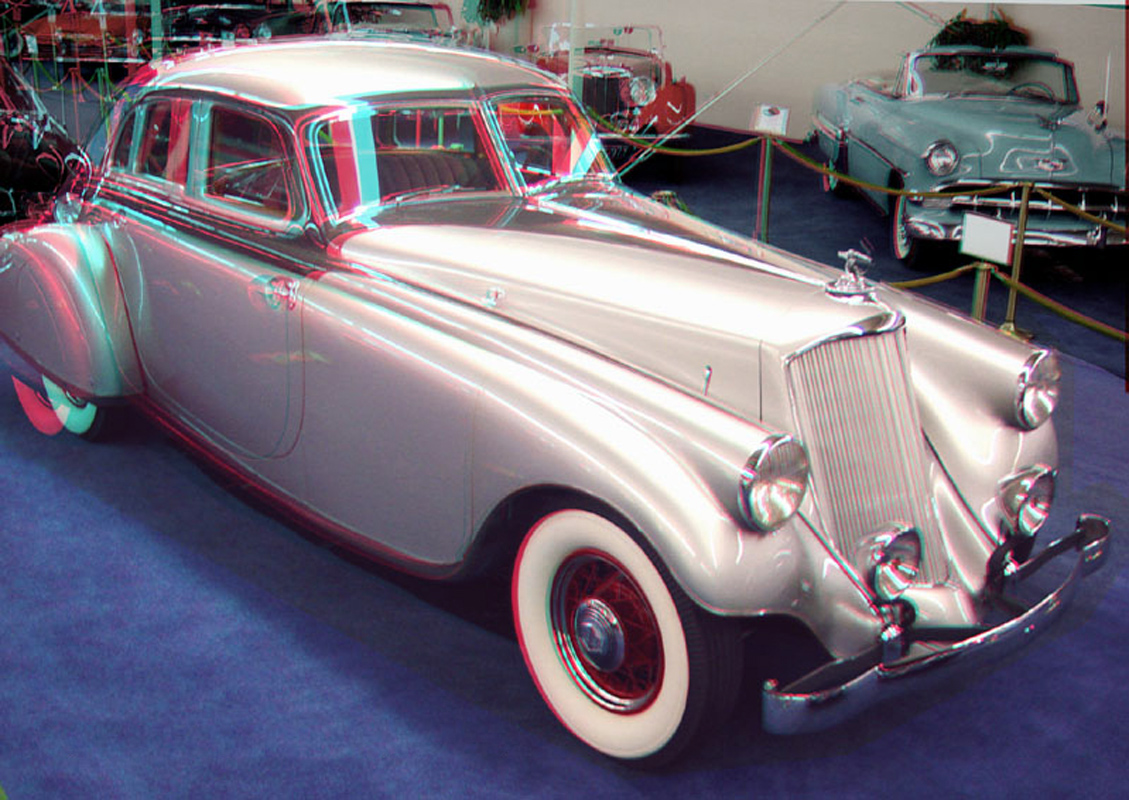

Overview
- Manufacturer: Pierce-Arrow
- Production: 1933
- Designer: Phillip O. Wright

Body and chassis
- Class: Ultra-luxury car
- Body style: 4-door sedan
- Layout: Front mid-engine, rear-wheel-drive

Powertrain
- Engine: 461.8 cu in (7,568 cc) V-12
- Power output: 175 hp (130 kW)
- Transmission: 3-speed manual

Dimensions
- Wheelbase: 139 in (3,531 mm)
- Curb weight: 2,314 kg (5,101 lb)

Pierce Silver Arrow engine

Overview
- Production: 1933

Layout
- Configuration: 12-cylinder
- Displacement: 4,618 cubic centimetres (282 cu in)
- Cylinder bore: 88.9 mm (3.50 in)
- Piston stroke: 101.6 mm (4.00 in)
- Valvetrain: 2 valves / cylinder, OHV
- Compression ratio: 6.1:1

Combustion
- Fuel system: Stromberg Carburettors

Output
- Power output: 175 bhp (130 kW; 177 PS) at 3,600 rpm

The Pierce Silver Arrow (also known as the 1933 Pierce-Arrow Silver Arrow) is a luxury automobile produced by the American automaker Pierce-Arrow in 1933. Designed by stylist Phillip O. Wright as a futuristic car, it was unveiled at the New York Auto Show in January 1933 and later exhibited at the Chicago Century of Progress World's Fair. Only five examples were hand-built, each priced at $10,000 roughly equivalent to three or four suburban homes at the time. The Silver Arrow is widely regarded as one of the most influential and forward-looking American car designs of the prewar era, often described by Pierce-Arrow as "the car of 1940 in 1933." Despite its radical styling, the Silver Arrow was constructed on a production Pierce-Arrow V12 chassis and used the company's most powerful engine. Three of the five original cars are known to survive today.

== Design and development ==
The Silver Arrow originated in 1932 when Phillip O. Wright, a young stylist recently laid off from General Motors' Art & Colour Section under Harley Earl, presented a 1/8-scale clay model and renderings to Pierce-Arrow sales executive Roy Faulkner. With the approval of Studebaker (which then owned Pierce-Arrow), the project was fast-tracked for the 1933 New York Auto Show. The bodies were hand formed in steel over three months by a team of about 30 craftsmen in Studebaker's prototype shop in South Bend, Indiana. Wright's design represented a dramatic departure from Pierce-Arrow's traditionally conservative styling. Key elements included a continuous fastback roofline flowing in one smooth plane from the windshield to the tail, envelope style front fenders with integrated and faired in headlamps (a streamlined evolution of Pierce-Arrow's patented fender mounted lights), flush fitting doors with recessed handles, the absence of running boards, and a "step down" interior floor. Spare wheels were concealed in lockers within the long front fenders, accessible via dashboard controls. The rear featured tapering pontoon fenders and a slit like rear window. The overall effect evoked aircraft streamlining and Art Deco influences, making the car appear lower and more aerodynamic than contemporary luxury sedans. Studebaker chief body engineer James R. Hughes adapted Wright's concept to a standard 139 inch wheelbase Pierce-Arrow chassis (originally planned for a longer 147 inch wheelbase) and incorporated elements from a rejected Studebaker fastback design. The result balanced innovation with Pierce-Arrow's engineering strengths.

== Technical specifications ==
The Silver Arrow was powered by Pierce-Arrow's 462 cubic inch (7,571 cc) side-valve (L-head) V12 engine, producing 175 horsepower at 3,600–4,000 rpm. It drove the rear wheels through a three speed manual transmission (with some reports of an automatic clutch). Top speed was advertised as 115 mph (185 km/h), though the car's 5,100–5,700 lb (2,315–2,590 kg) curb weight made this ambitious. Other features included vacuum-assisted four wheel mechanical drum brakes and a luxurious interior trimmed in broadcloth, leather, and curly maple wood, with amenities such as a rear auxiliary speedometer, clock, and radio speaker.

== Reception ==
The Silver Arrow caused an immediate sensation at the 1933 New York and Boston auto shows and at Chicago's Century of Progress exposition, where it upstaged competitors such as Cadillac's Aero-Dynamic coupe, Duesenberg's "Twenty Grand," and Packard's "Car of the Dome." Promotional materials emphasized its forward-looking design, and a cast-iron toy replica became a popular fair souvenir. Despite the acclaim, the Great Depression severely limited the market for ultra-luxury cars. Pierce-Arrow's sales continued to decline, and the company returned to independent ownership in 1933 before ultimately ceasing production in 1938.

== Legacy and production models ==
Design elements from the Silver Arrow particularly the fastback tail appeared on the more conventional 1934–1935 Pierce-Arrow production models also marketed as "Silver Arrow," though these lacked the show car's radical streamlining and were built in greater numbers on standard chassis. The original 1933 Silver Arrow remains a landmark in automotive design history, frequently cited among the most influential prewar American cars for its slab-sided styling, integrated features, and bold fastback profile that foreshadowed postwar trends.

== Surviving examples ==
Of the five hand-built 1933 Silver Arrows, three are known to survive. Notable examples have appeared at major auctions and concours events, including one that sold for $2.31 million (including fees) at RM Sotheby's Hershey auction in 2017.

== Gallery ==
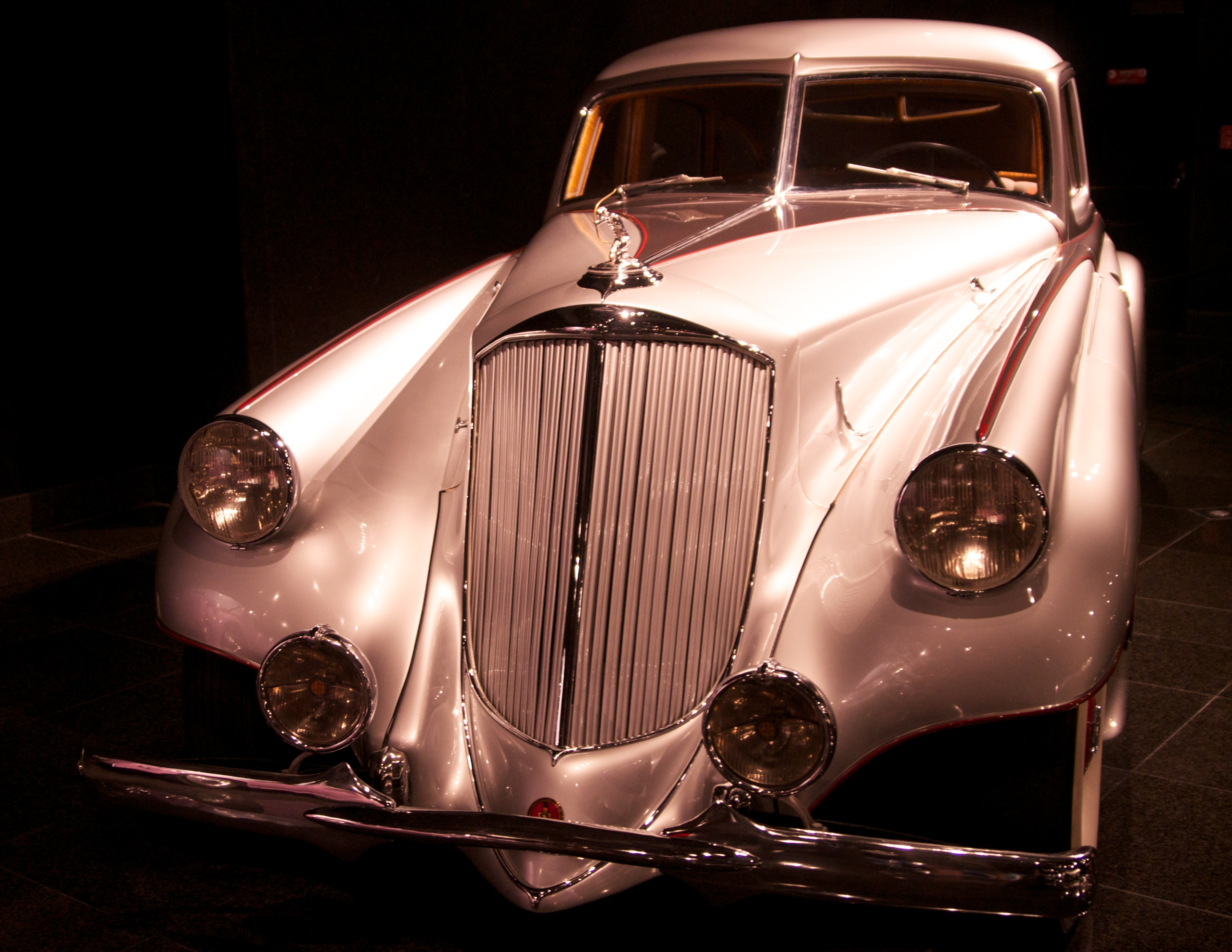

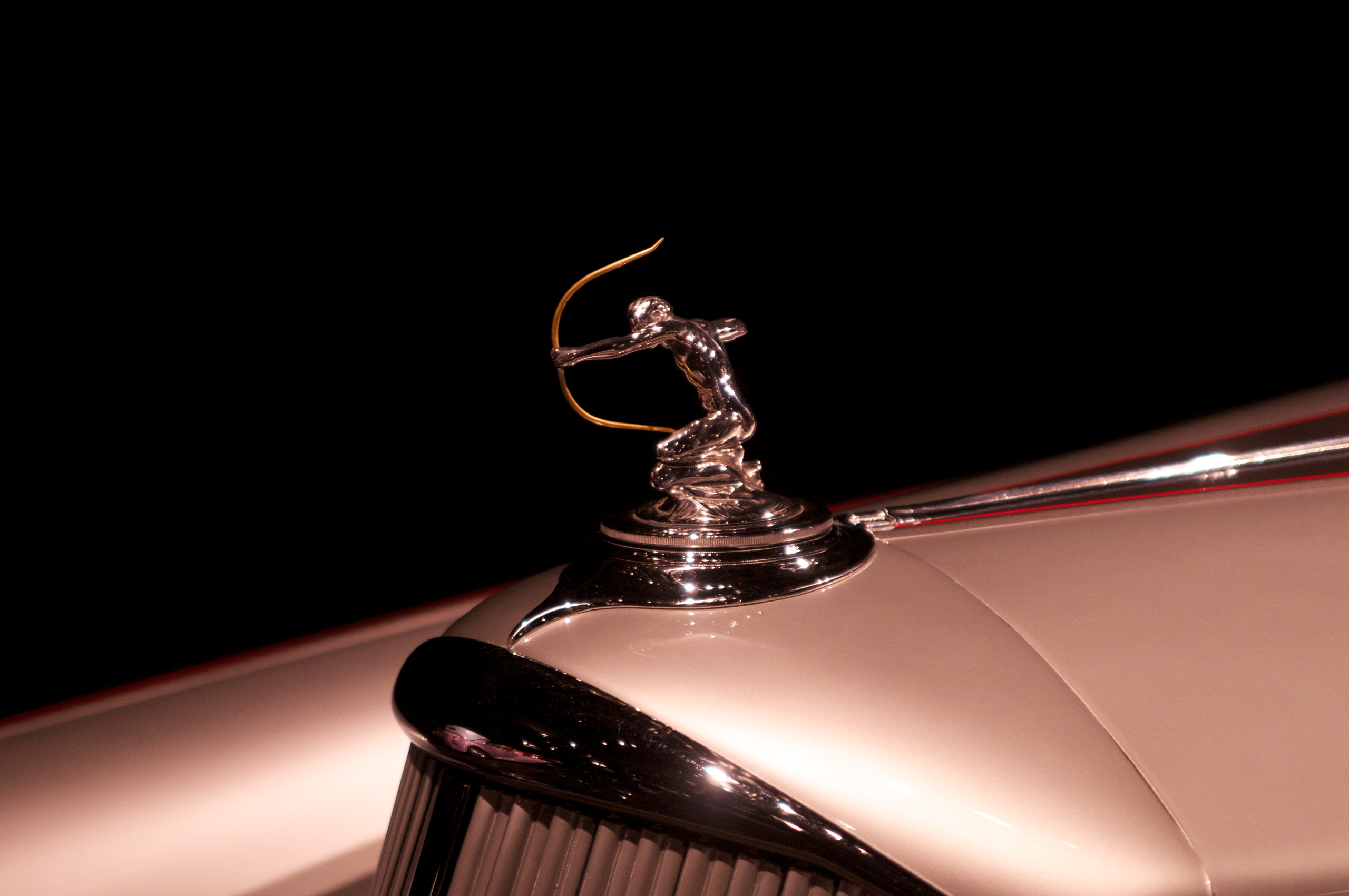
Hood ornament

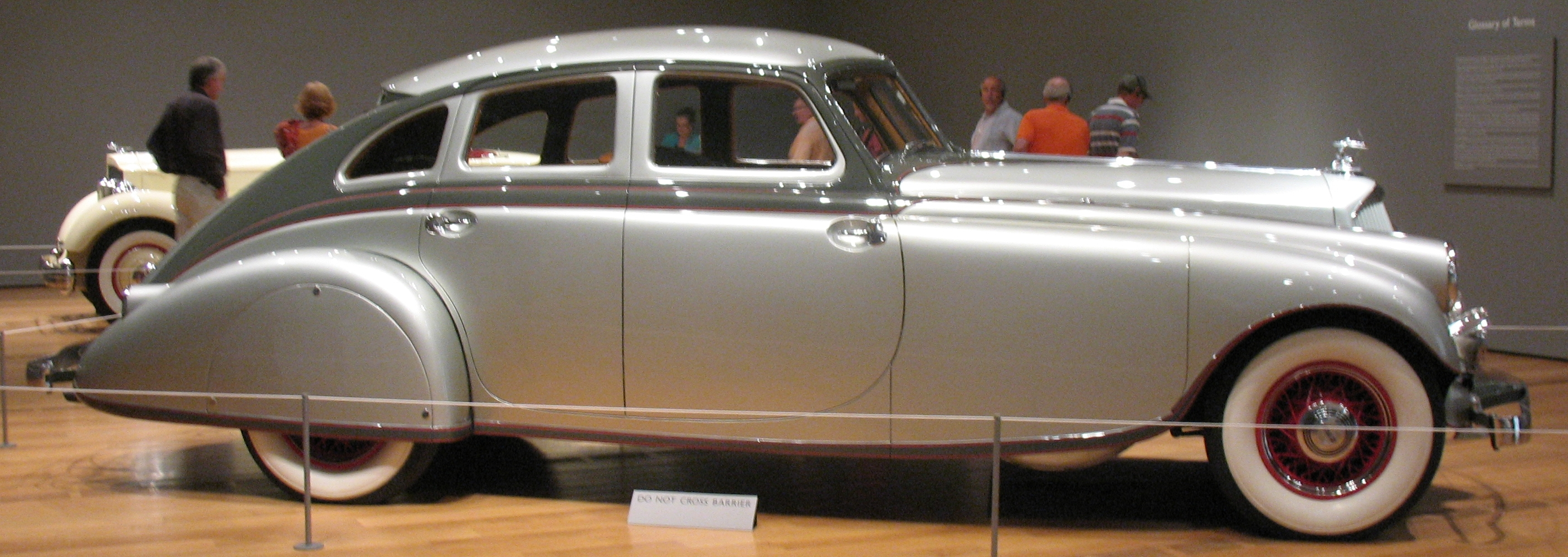

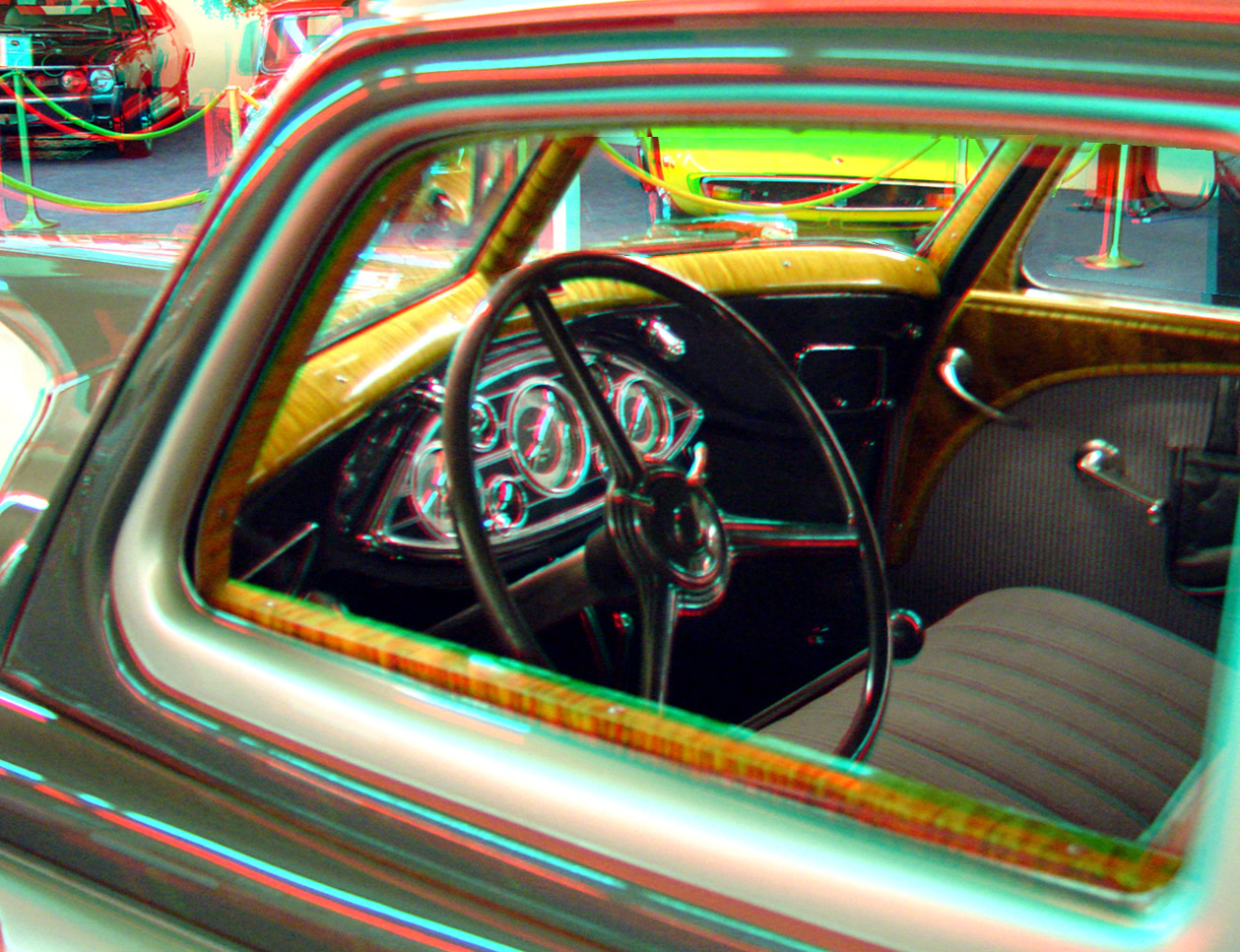
Interior
