= Pierce-Arrow Motor Car Company =

Defunct American motor vehicle manufacturer

Coordinates: 42.9428°N 78.8739°W

Pierce-Arrow
- Industry: Automotive
- Founded: 1865; 1901 (as auto manufacturer)
- Founder: George N. Pierce
- Defunct: 1938
- Headquarters: Buffalo, New York, United States
- Products: Motor vehicles Automotive parts

The Pierce-Arrow Motor Car Company was an American motor vehicle manufacturer based in Buffalo, New York, active from 1901 to 1938. Although best known for its expensive luxury cars, Pierce-Arrow also manufactured commercial trucks, fire trucks, boats, camp trailers, motorcycles, and bicycles.

== Origin ==
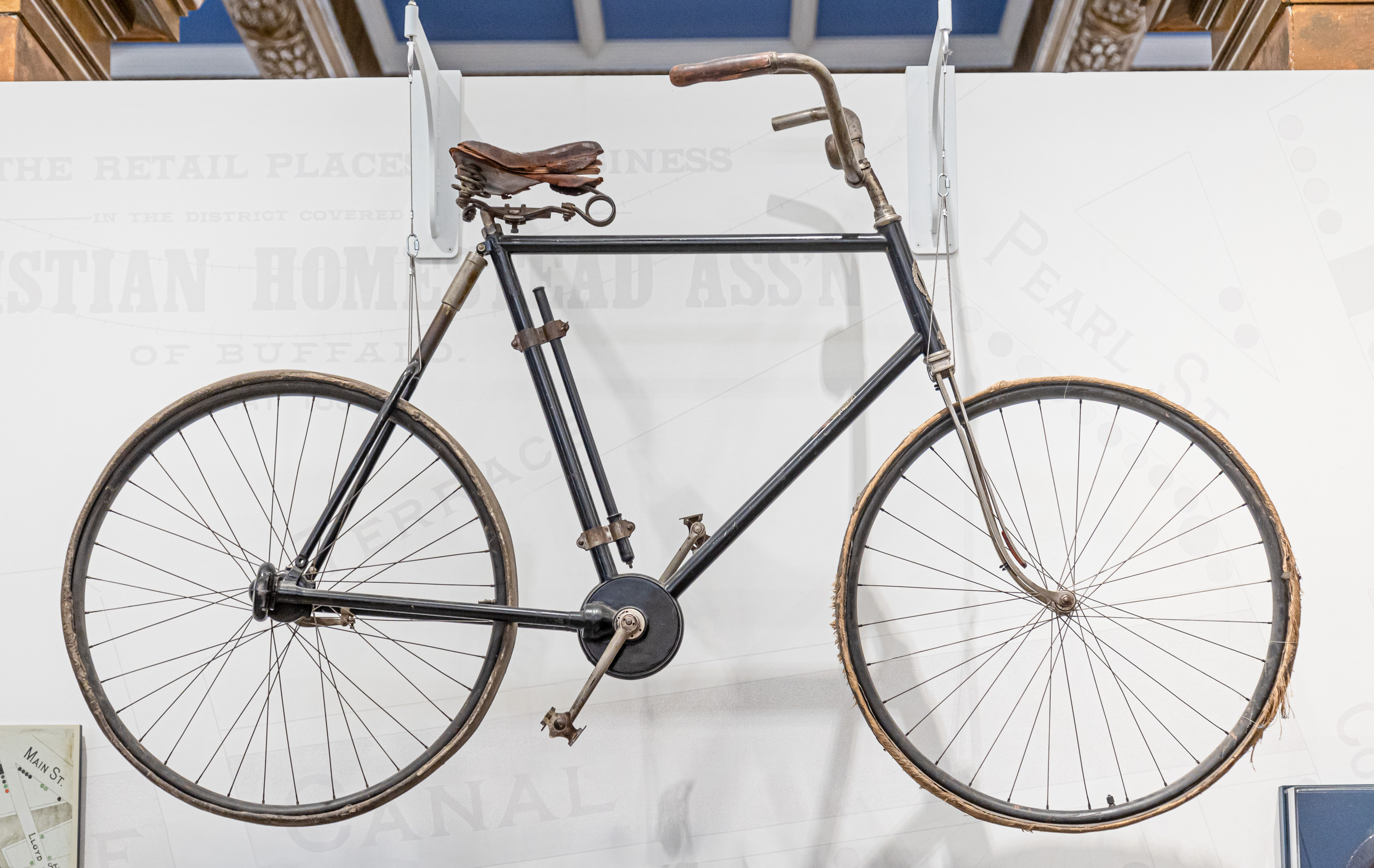
1901 Pierce bicycle at the Buffalo History Museum

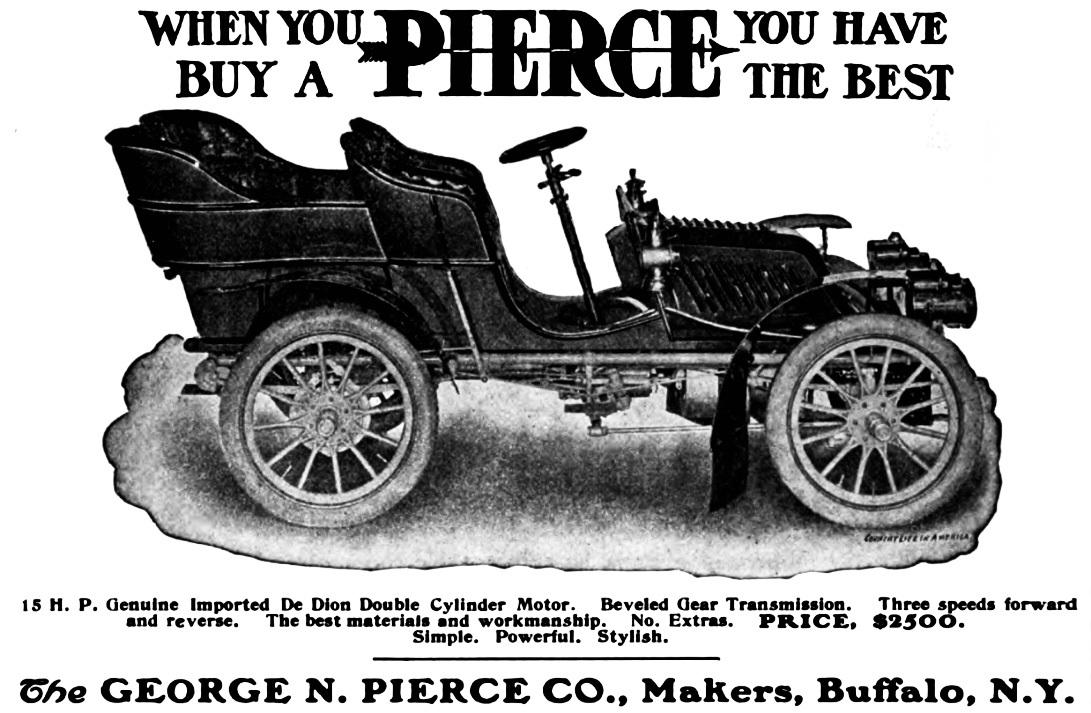
Pierce-Arrow Touring 15 HP (1903)

The forerunner of Pierce-Arrow was established in 1865 as Heinz, Pierce and Munschauer. The company was best known for its household items, especially its delicate, gilded birdcages. In 1872, George Norman Pierce bought out the other two principals of the company, changed the name to the George N. Pierce Company, and in 1896, added bicycles to the product line. The company failed in its attempt to build a steam-powered car in 1900 under license from Overman, but by 1901, had built its first single-cylinder, two-speed, no-reverse Motorette. In 1903, it produced a two-cylinder car, the Arrow.

In 1904, Pierce decided to concentrate on building a larger, more luxurious car for the upscale market, the 'Great Arrow'. This became the company's most successful product. The solidly built, four-cylinder car won the Glidden Tour in 1905, an endurance run to determine and celebrate the most reliable car. Thirty-three cars entered the 350-mile race from New York City to Bretton Woods, New Hampshire; the race was won by Percy Pierce in a Great Arrow.

The noted industrial architect Albert Kahn designed the Pierce Arrow Factory Complex at Elmwood Avenue and Great Arrow Avenue in about 1906. It was listed on the National Register of Historic Places in 1974. George Pierce sold all rights in the company in 1907, and he died three years later. In 1908, Pierce Motor Company was renamed as the Pierce-Arrow Motor Car Company.

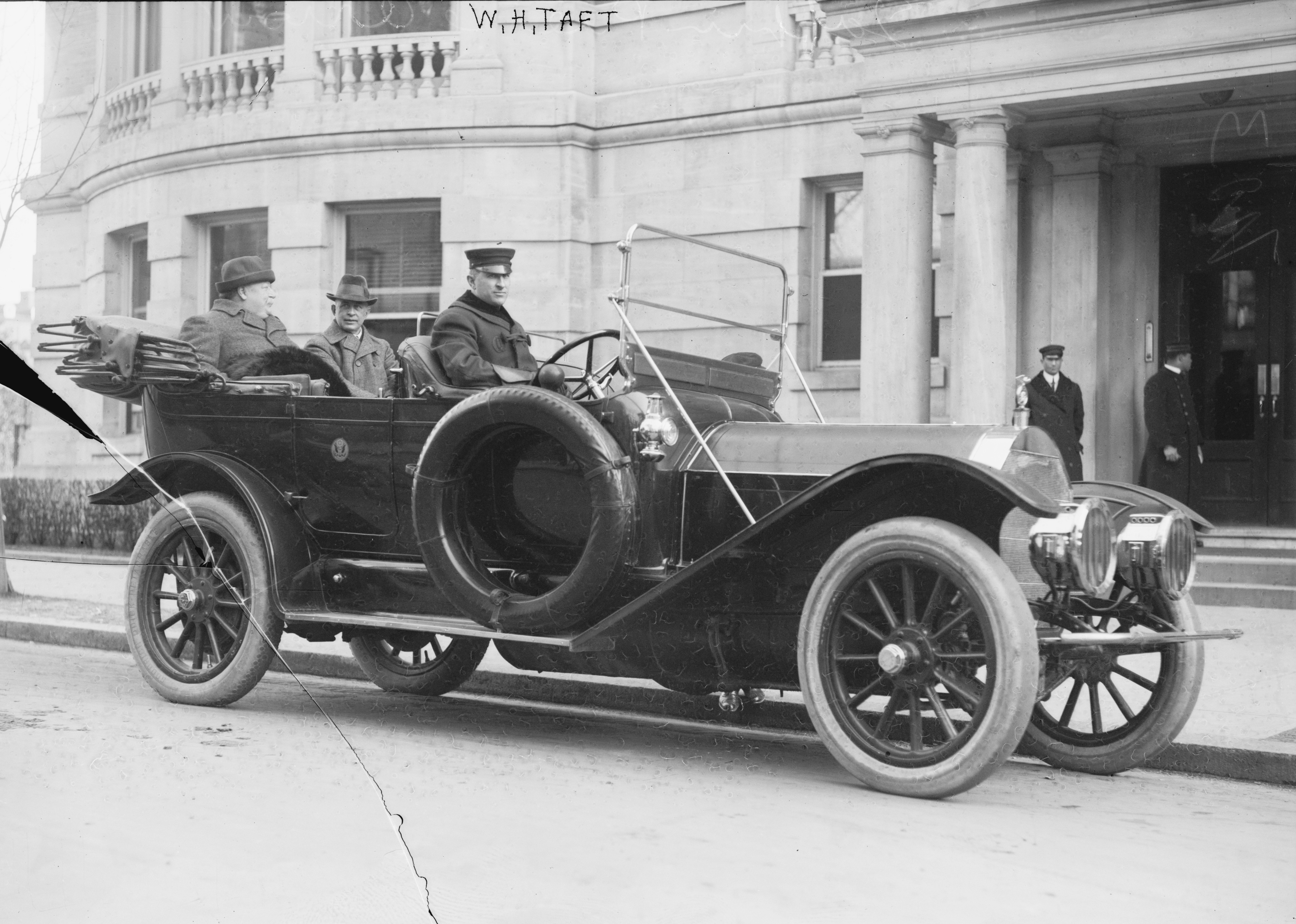
U. S. President William Howard Taft in his Pierce-Arrow touring car

In 1909, U.S. President William Howard Taft ordered two Pierce-Arrows (and two White Model M Tourers) to be used for state occasions, the first official cars of the White House.

The Pierce-Arrow's engine displacement started at 453 cu in (7.4 L), continuing to a massive 11.7 L (714.0 cu in) and was increased later to 5 inch bore and 7 inch stroke for 13.52 L (825.0 cu in), at the time making it by far the largest Otto engine offered in any production automobile in the world. In 1910, Pierce dropped its other 4-cylinder models and focused exclusively on 6-cylinder cars until 1929. The models 6-36, 6-48, and 6-66 continued for the next decade. Starting in 1918, Pierce-Arrow adopted a four-valve per cylinder T-head inline-six engine (Dual Valve Six) and three spark plugs per cylinder, one of the few, if only, multi-valve flathead design engines ever made. The company did not introduce an 8-cylinder engine until the 1929 Model 126, and a V-12 engine was offered in 1931 until the company closed in 1938.

In 1910, George Pierce died. In 1912, Herbert M. Dawley (later a Broadway actor-director) joined Pierce-Arrow, and he designed almost every model until 1938. Until 1914, Pierce-Arrow also made a line of motorcycles, including the Pierce Four.

In 1914, Pierce-Arrow adopted its most enduring styling hallmark when its headlights were moved from a traditional placement at the radiator's sides, into flared housings molded into the front fenders of the car. This gave the car an immediately visible distinction in front or side views. At night, the car appeared to have a wider stance. Pierce patented this placement, which endured until the final model of 1938, although Pierce always offered customers the option of conventional headlamps; only a minority ordered this option.

The Pierce-Arrow was a status symbol, owned by many Hollywood stars and tycoons, and a favorite was the Pierce-Arrow Town Car. Most of the royalty of the world had at least one Pierce-Arrow in its collection. Some have described Pierce and two of its rivals among American luxury cars, Peerless and Packard, as the "Three P's of Motordom." Industrial efficiency expert Frank Gilbreth, father of the authors of "Cheaper By The Dozen," extolled the virtues of Pierce-Arrow, in both quality and in its ability to safely transport his large family. Its wheelbase was 12 ft 3 in (3.73 m). The transmission was a four speed manual in 1919. Actor Sessue Hayakawa (famed for his role in Bridge on the River Kwai) drove a custom-ordered gold-plated Pierce-Arrow. A restored 1919 Pierce-Arrow is on display at the Woodrow Wilson Presidential Library. An open-bodied Pierce-Arrow carried Woodrow Wilson and Warren G. Harding to Harding's 1921 inauguration, and one was used prominently in the 1950 movie Cheaper by the Dozen.

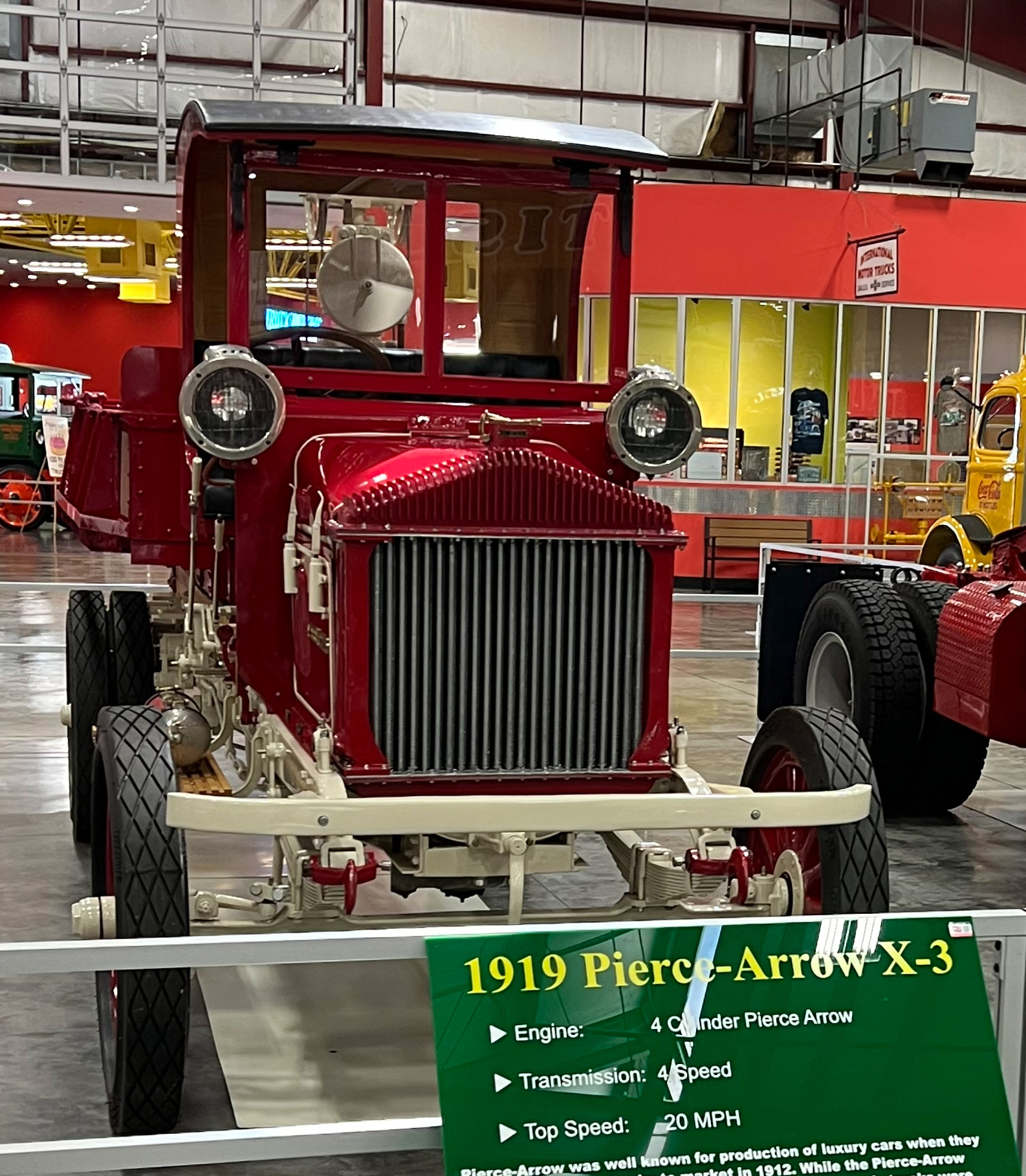
1919 Pierce-Arrow X-3 truck on display at the Iowa 80 Trucking Museum, Walcott, Iowa

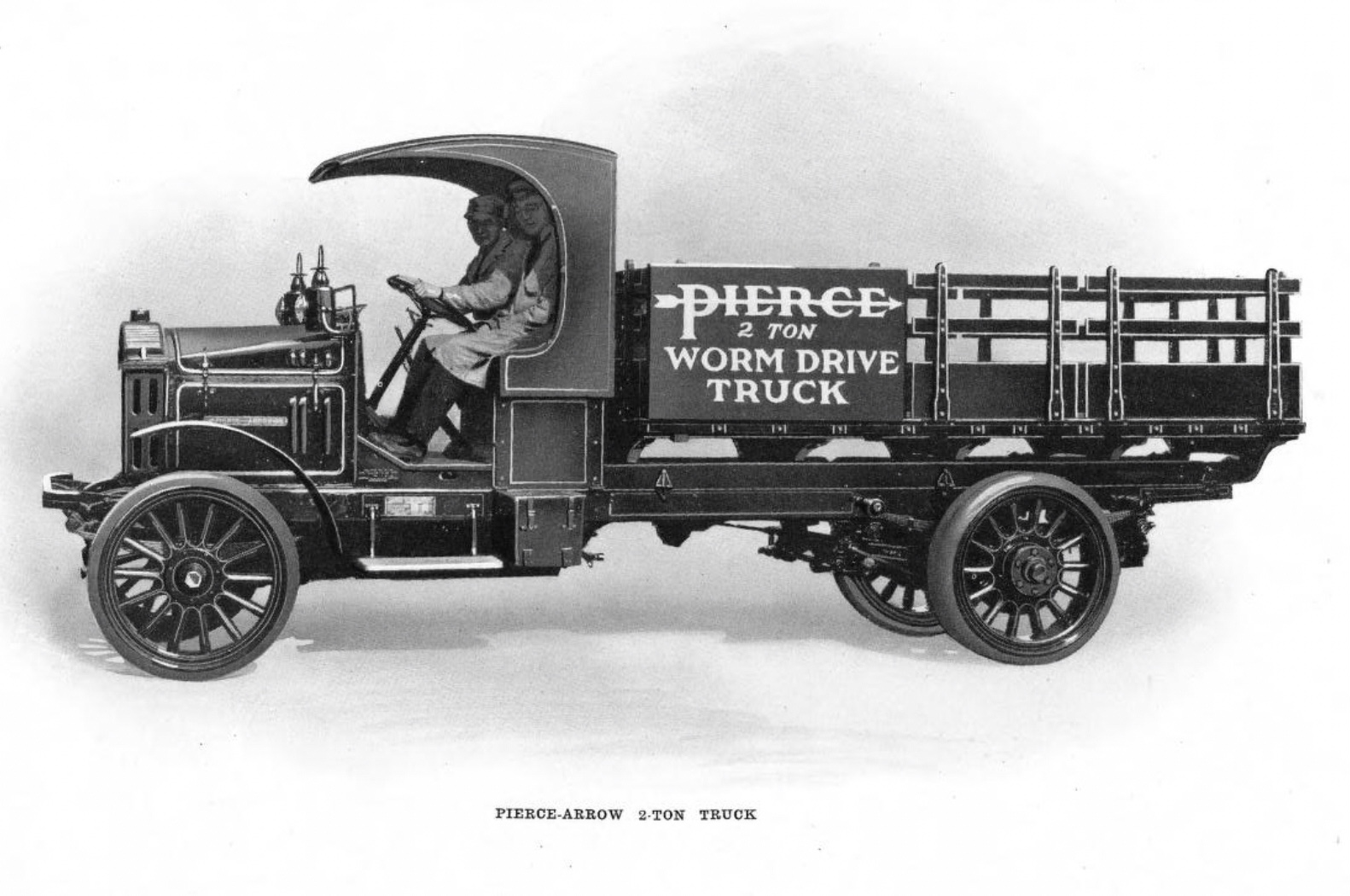
Pierce-Arrow X-2 (1913–1918)

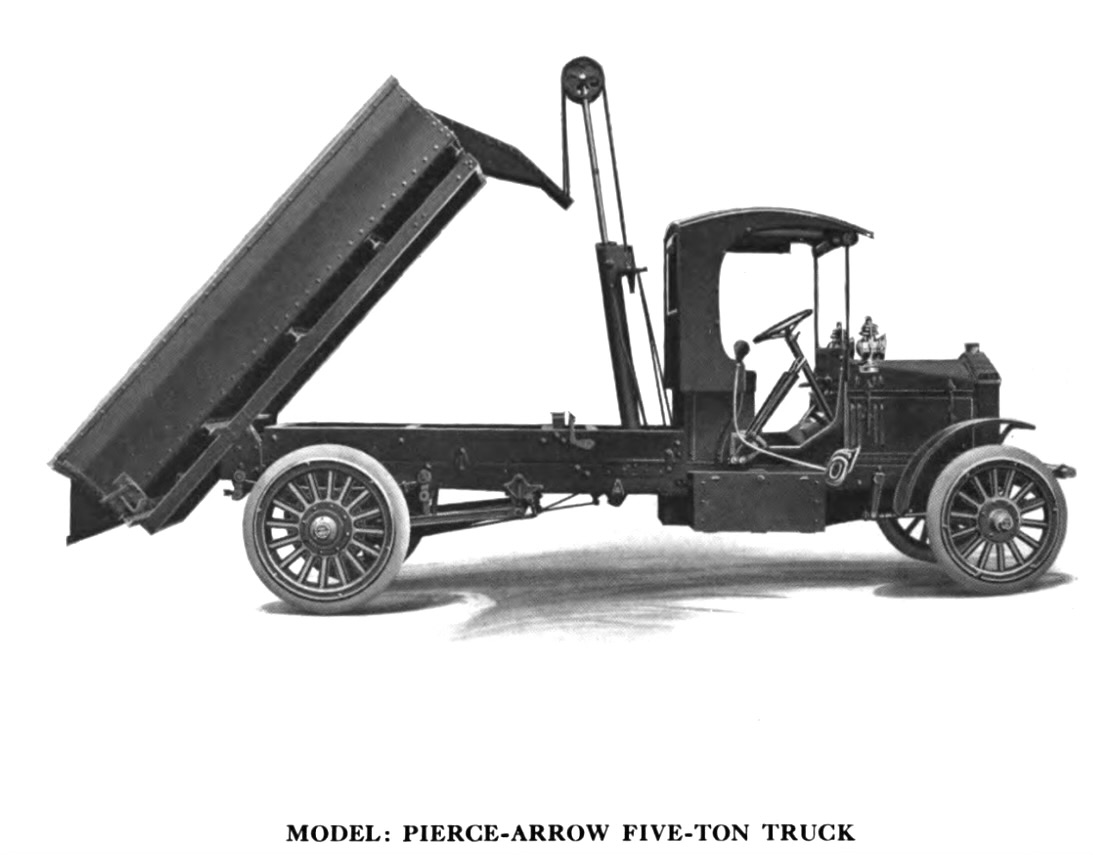
Pierce-Arrow R-5 (1914–1918) 5 t

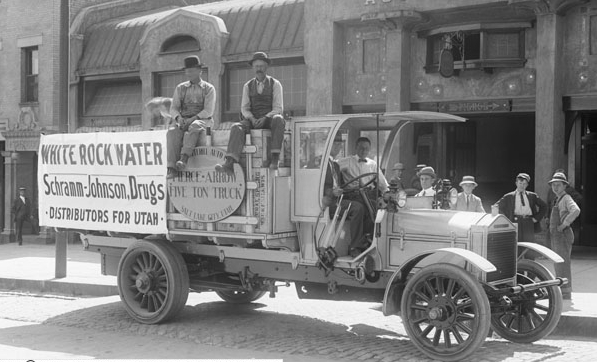
1911 Pierce-Arrow R Five-ton Truck

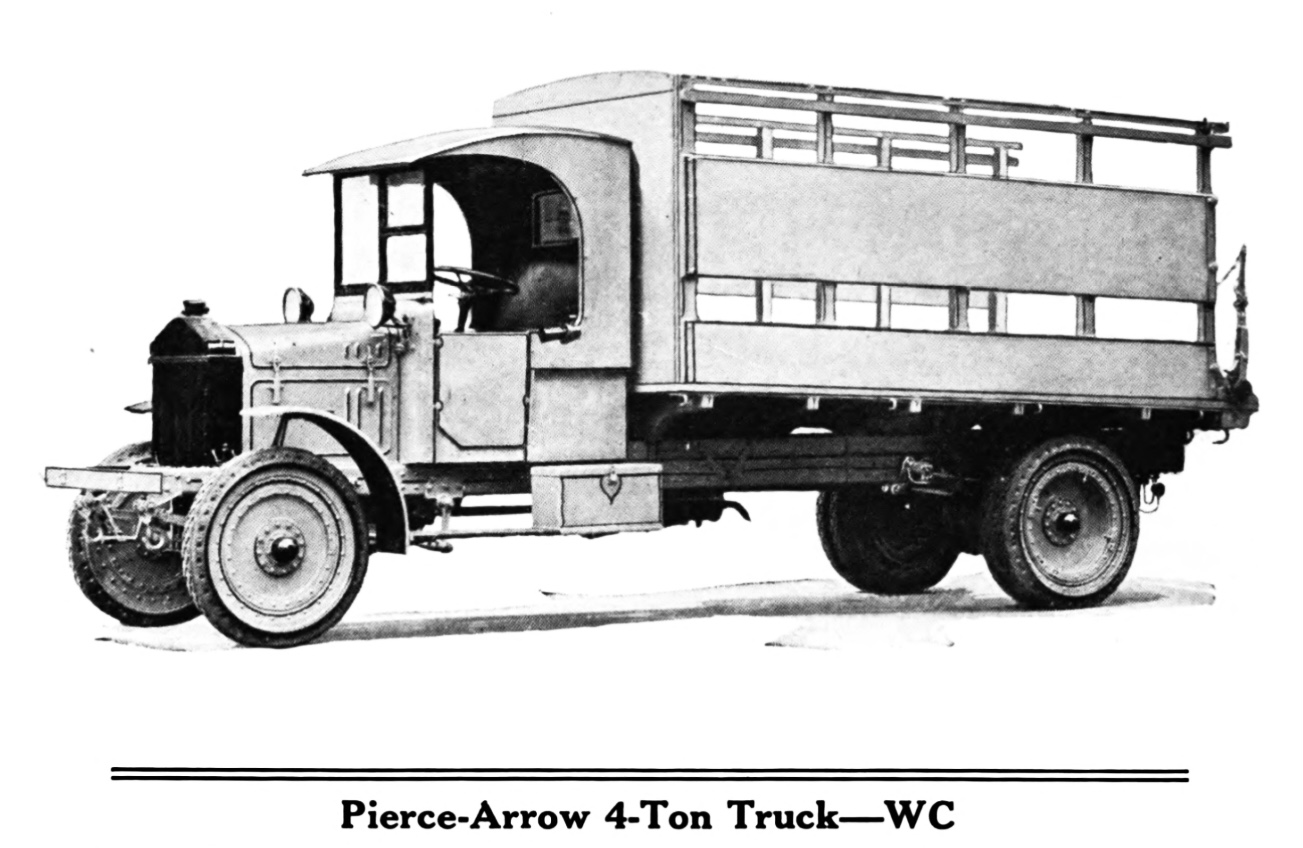
Pierce-Arrow WC (1925–1931)

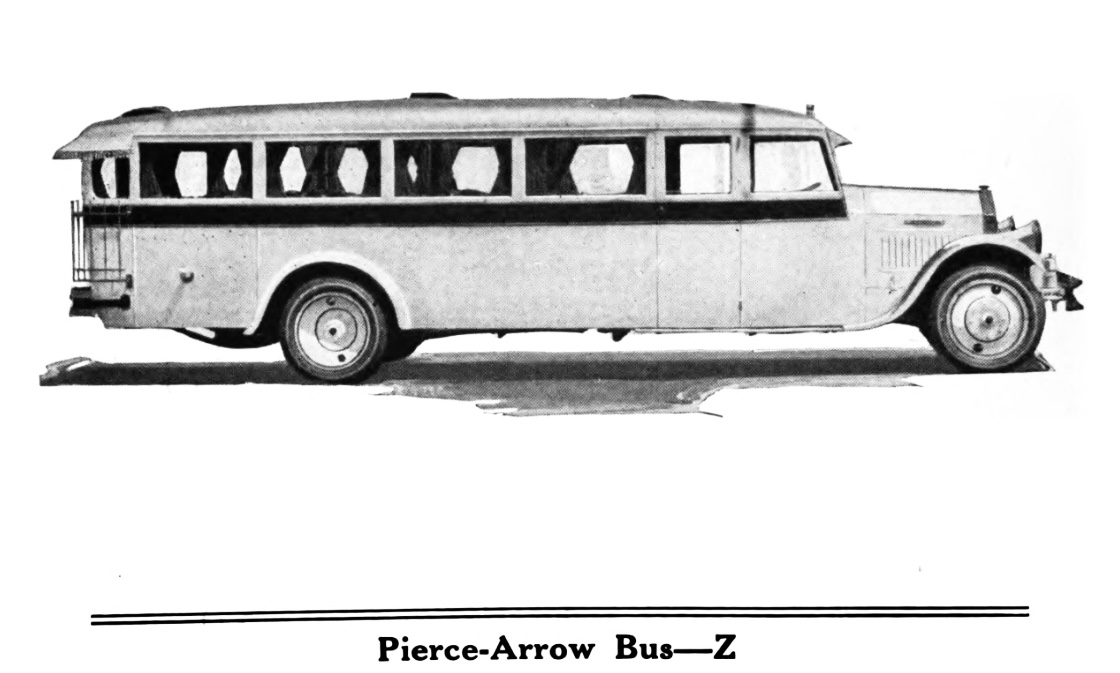
Pierce-Arrow Z (1928)

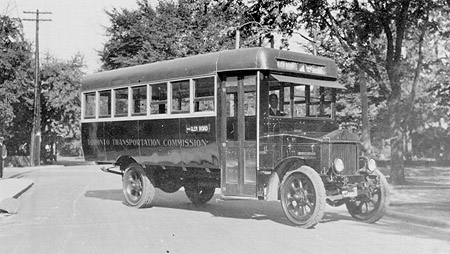
Pierce Arrow bus (TTC Toronto, Canada)

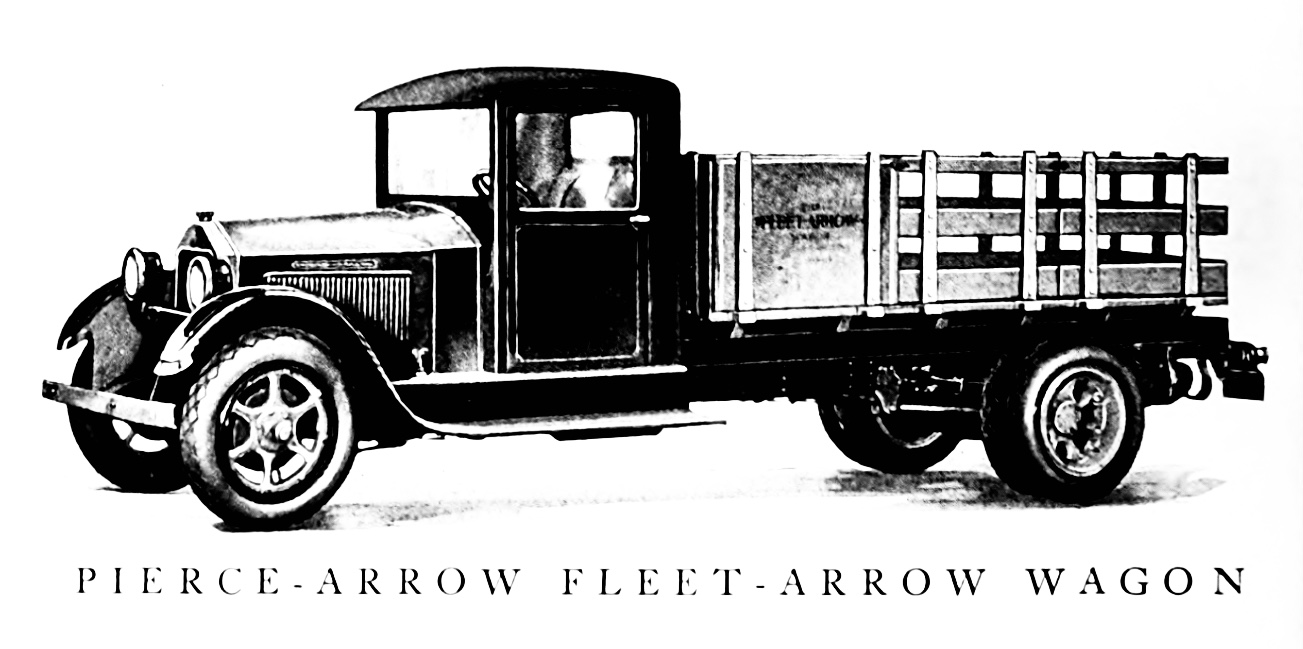
Pierce-Arrow Fleet Arrow (1928–1929)

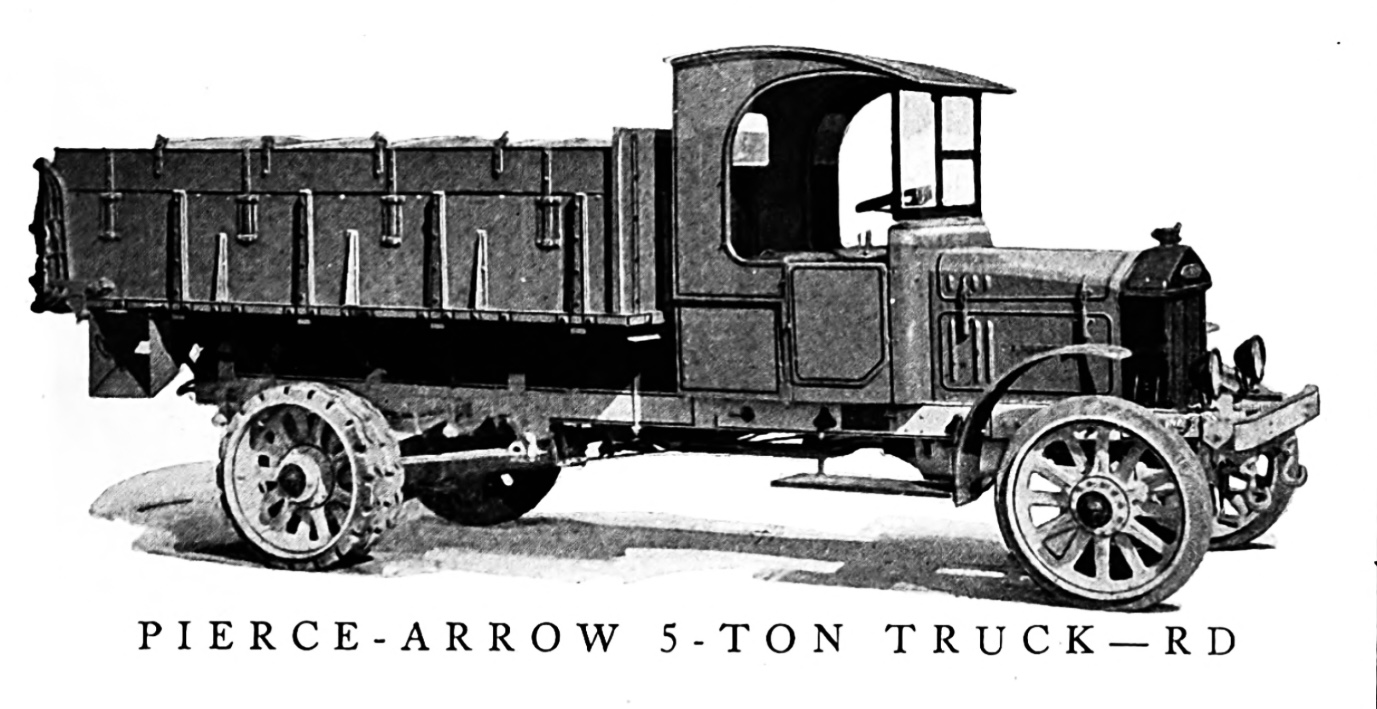
Pierce-Arrow RD (1928–1931)

Pierce-Arrow advertisements were artistic and understated. Unusual for car advertising, the image of the car was in the background rather than the foreground of the picture. Usually, only part of the car was visible. The Pierce-Arrow was typically depicted in elegant and fashionable settings. Some advertisements featured the car in places a car would not normally go, such as the West and other rural settings, a testament to the car's ruggedness and quality.

Because of the immense size of most models, several second-hand Pierce-Arrow cars were bought by fire departments, stripped down to the chassis and engine, the wheelbase lengthened, and built back into fire engines. Some of these fire engines were in service for up to 20 years.

== 1928–1933 ==
In 1928, the Studebaker Corporation of South Bend, Indiana, gained control of the Buffalo firm. The association was to last for five years, with moderate benefits to both companies' engineering departments, which continued to function as separate entities. Pierce-Arrow also gained a dealer network, as the cars were sold through Studebaker dealerships. Under Studebaker's ownership, Pierce-Arrow retired the venerable 6-cylinder engine and in 1929 introduced an L-head straight-eight engine, which displaced 366 cu in (6.0 L).

The tie-up also led to the establishment of a Canadian subsidiary called the "Pierce-Arrow Company of Canada Ltd." which built a small number of cars in Walkerville, Ontario (now part of Windsor) between 1928 and 1934.

Year	Production Cars	Production Trucks	Model Truck
1928	5,492	999	XA, XB, WC, RD, RF, FA, Fleet Arrow, ⟨Z⟩
1929	9,840	507	XA, XB, WC, RD, RF, FA, Fleet Arrow, HB
1930	6,916	6	
1931	4,210	114	PT, PW, PX, PY, PZ
1932	2,241	70	PT, PW, PX, PY, PZ
Sum	28,699	1,696	

Model in angle bracket = ⟨bus⟩

== 1933–1938 ==
In 1933, Pierce-Arrow unveiled the radically streamlined Silver Arrow in a final attempt to appeal to the wealthy at the New York Auto Show. The car was well received by the public and the motoring press, being announced with the slogan "Suddenly it's 1940!" Pierce sold five examples but, since it was priced at $10,000 (equal to $248,715 today) during the worst of the Depression, even the rich were hesitant to spend so much. The bodies were built at Studebaker, which subsequently assisted in rolling out a lower-priced production model. This, however, lacked many luxury features of the show car and still failed to generate enough sales.

Starting in 1936, Pierce-Arrow produced a line of camper-trailers, the Pierce-Arrow Travelodge. They also produced a new V12 sedan that was redesigned and considered the safest and most luxurious sedan of its day.

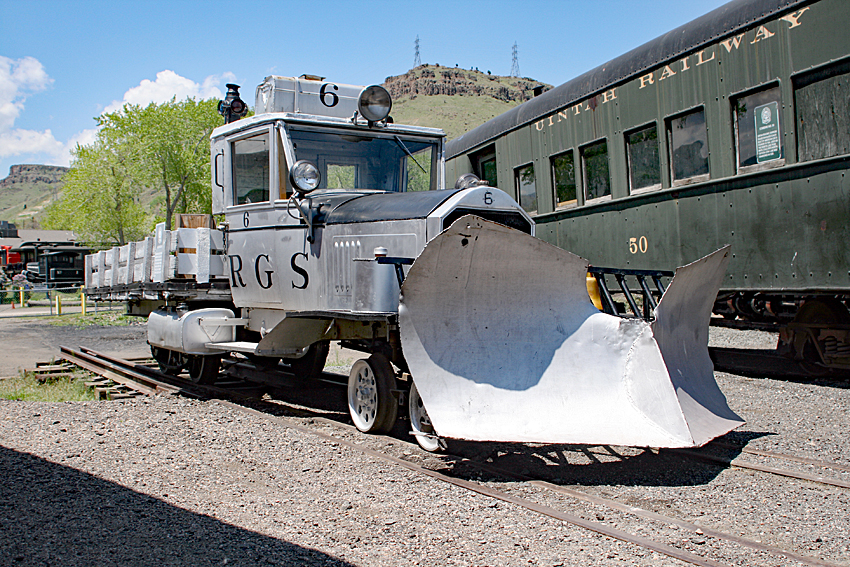
Rio Grande Southern RR Pierce-Arrow Galloping Goose No 6 at Golden

The Rio Grande Southern Railroad converted five Pierce-Arrow automobiles (and a couple of Buicks) into motorized railcars, effectively buses and trucks on rail wheels. The nickname Galloping Goose was soon applied to these vehicles, reportedly based on their waddling motion and honking horn. Three are preserved in the Colorado Railroad Museum at Golden.

Pierce was the only luxury brand that did not field a lower-priced car (e.g., the Packard 120) to provide cash flow, and without sales or funds for development, the company declared insolvency in 1938 and closed its doors. The final Pierce-Arrow assembled was built by Karl Wise, the firm's chief engineer, from parts secured from the company's receivers. Pierce's remaining assets (which probably would include the forty Arrows made in October 1938) were sold at auction on a Friday, May 13, 1938.

The factory equipment used to make Pierce-Arrow V12 engines was bought by Seagrave Fire Apparatus, which used it to make engines for fire engines.

== Name trademark ==
In 2006, a group of classic car enthusiasts from Switzerland applied the name to a 10 L, 24-cylinder car designed by Luigi Colani. According to their (since defunct) website, the company intended to revive the Pierce-Arrow car in the form of a Pierce Silver Arrow II.

The U.S. Trademark Trial and Appeal Board ruled on August 12, 2019, that "Pierce-Arrow" cannot be registered by an unrelated third party as a trademark for the production of a new automobile. This decision establishes a new precedent for protection of Collective Membership Marks.

== List of models ==
There were at least 39 defined models, listed here. Many of them differ only in wheelbase.

- Pierce Stanhope
- Pierce Great Arrow
- Pierce Arrow 24 HP
- Pierce Arrow 36 HP
- Pierce Arrow 40 HP
- Pierce Arrow 48 HP
- Pierce Arrow 60 HP
- Pierce Arrow 66 HP
- Pierce Silver Arrow
- Pierce-Arrow 1601
- Pierce-Arrow 1602
- Pierce-Arrow 1603
- Pierce-Arrow 1701
- Pierce-Arrow 1702
- Pierce-Arrow 1703
- Pierce-Arrow 1801
- Pierce-Arrow 1802
- Pierce-Arrow 1803
- Pierce-Arrow Model 31
- Pierce-Arrow Model 32
- Pierce-Arrow Model 33
- Pierce-Arrow Model 36
- Pierce-Arrow Model 38-C 3 (1915–1916)
- Pierce-Arrow Model 41
- Pierce-Arrow Model 42
- Pierce-Arrow Model 43
- Pierce-Arrow Model 51
- Pierce-Arrow Model 52
- Pierce-Arrow Model 53
- Pierce-Arrow Model 54
- Pierce-Arrow Model 80
- Pierce-Arrow Model 81
- Pierce-Arrow Model 133
- Pierce-Arrow Model 143
- Pierce-Arrow Model 836/836A
- Pierce-Arrow Model 840/840A
- Pierce-Arrow Model 845
- Pierce-Arrow Model 1236
- Pierce-Arrow Model 1240/1240A
- Pierce-Arrow Model 1242
- Pierce-Arrow Model 1245
- Pierce-Arrow Model 1247
- Pierce-Arrow Model 1248A
- Pierce-Arrow Model 1255
- Pierce-Arrow Model A
- Pierce-Arrow Model B
- Pierce-Arrow Model C

== Gallery ==
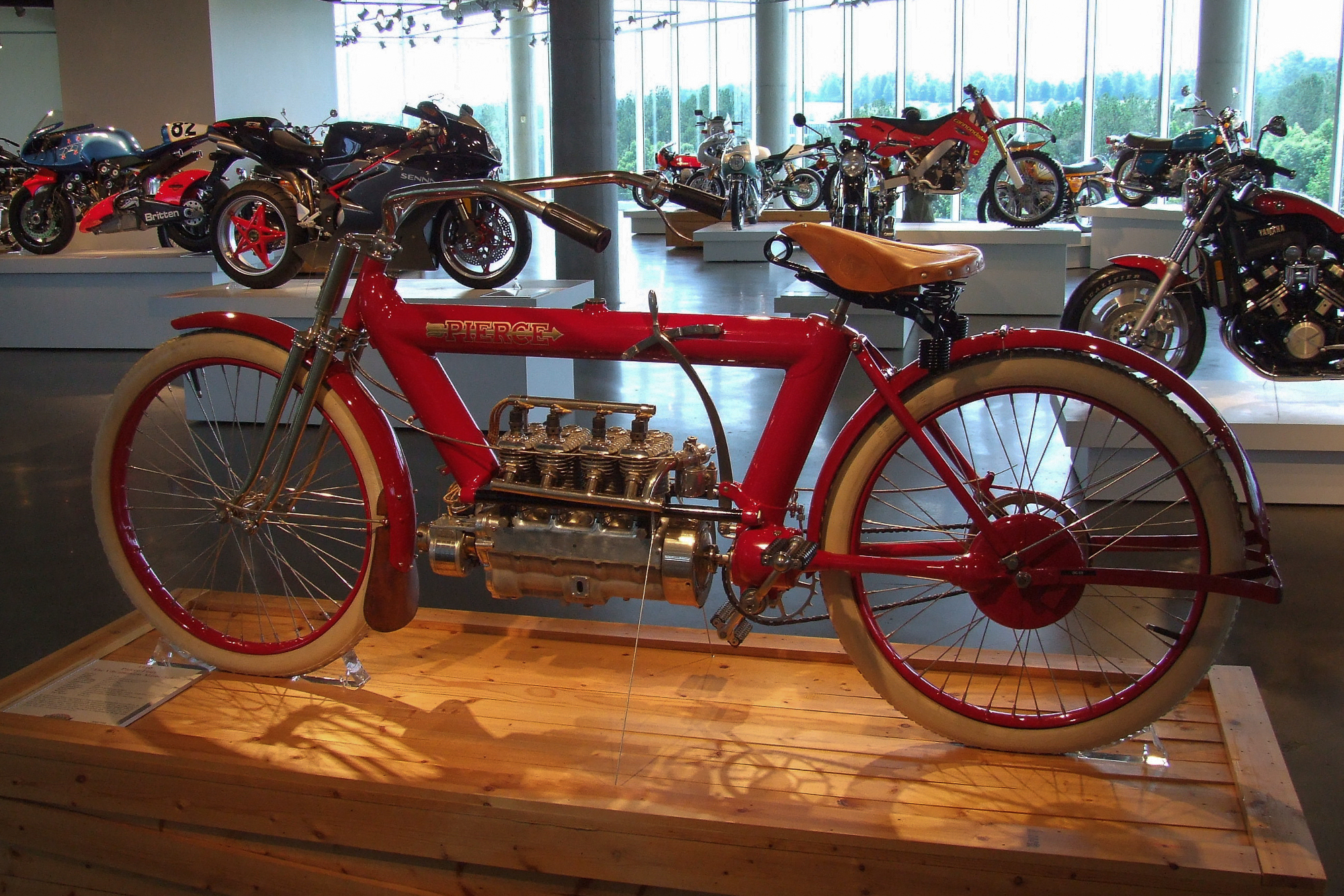
1911 Pierce Four motorcycle

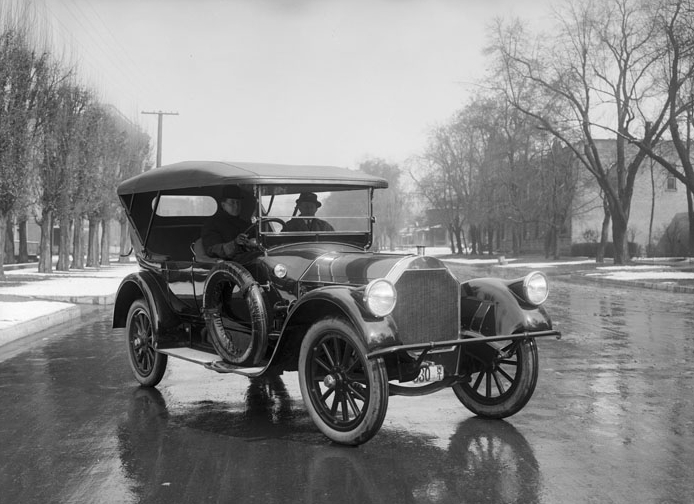
1915 Touring Car, Salt Lake City, Utah

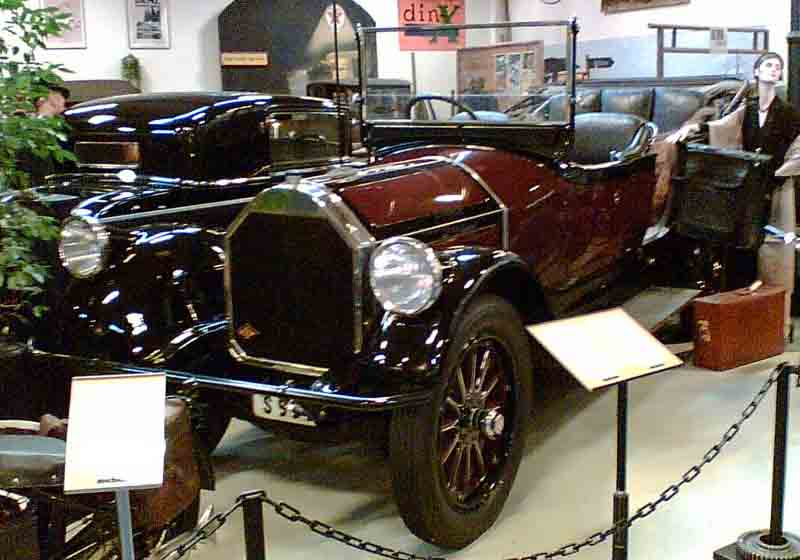
Pierce-Arrow vehicles Model 48-B-5 7-Passenger Touring 1919

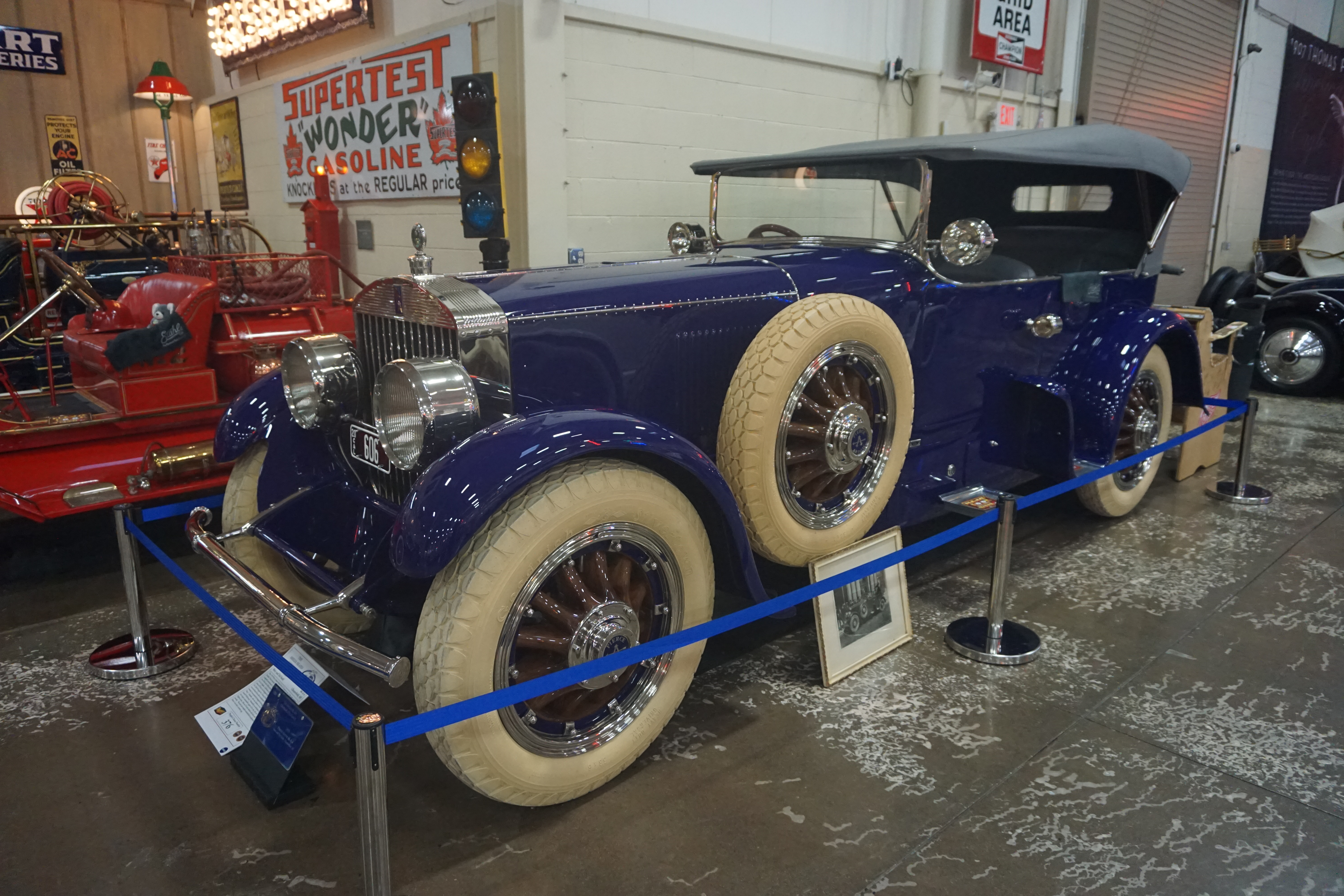
1919 Pierce-Arrow Model 66 A-4

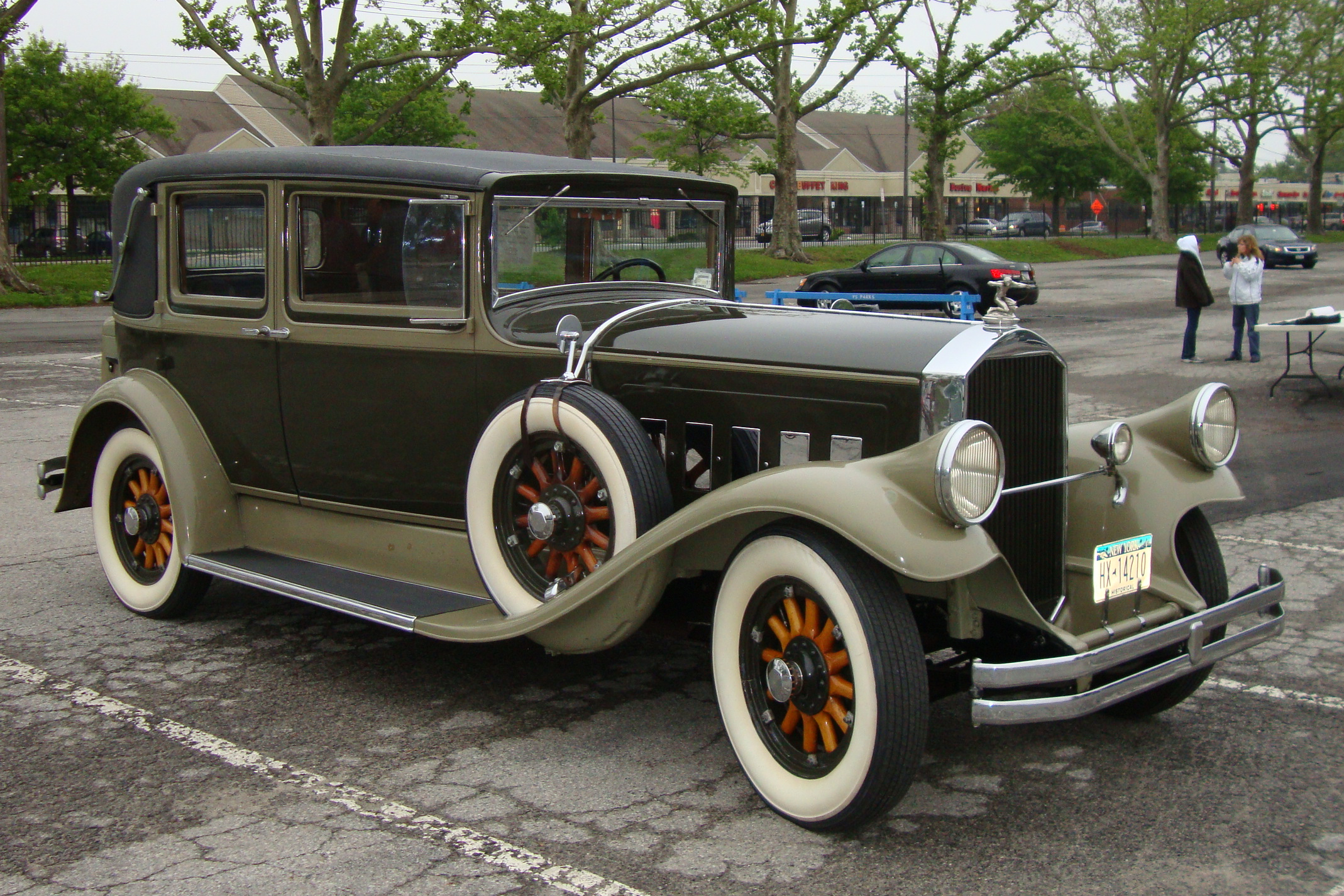
1929 Pierce Arrow

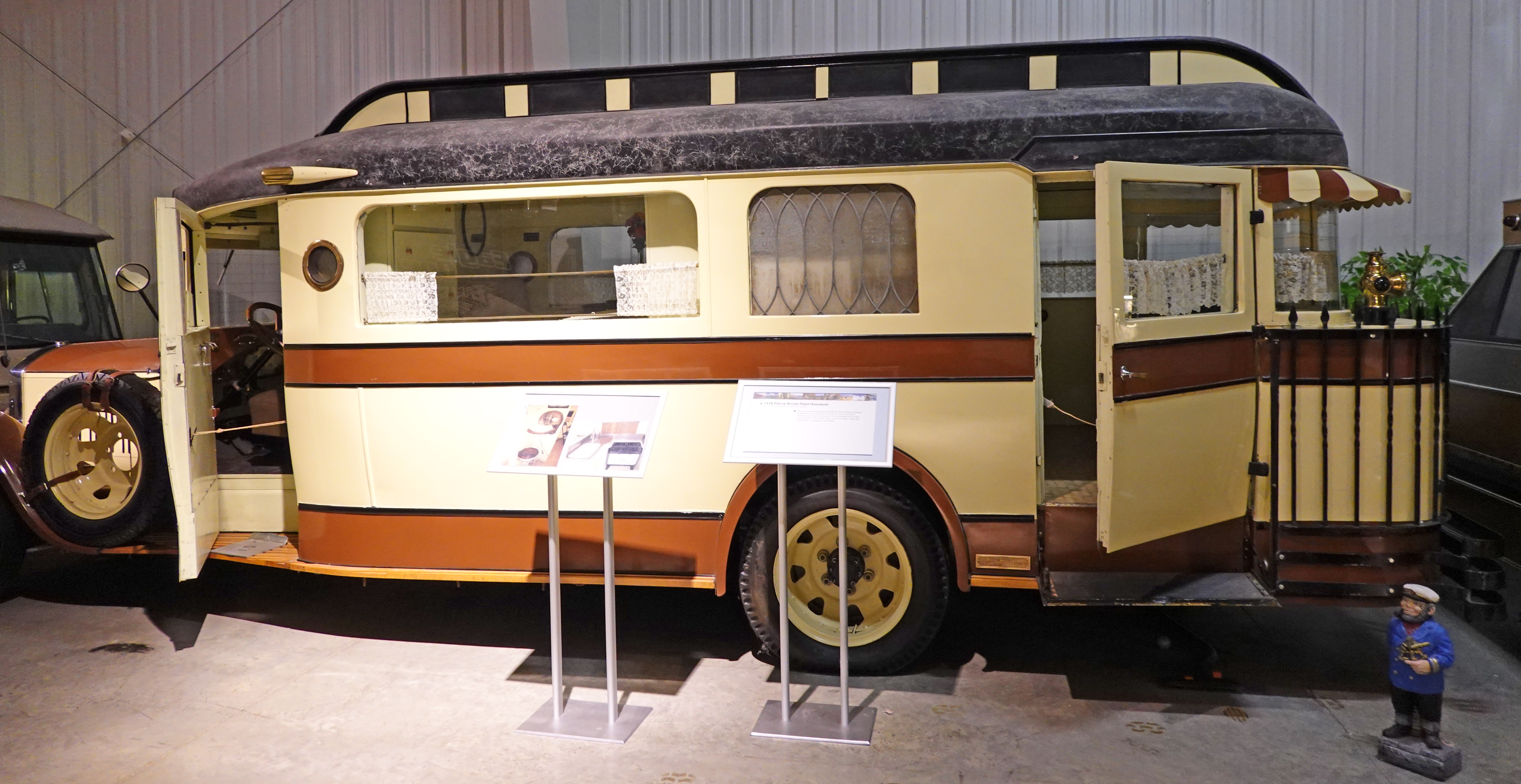
1928 Pierce-Arrow Fleet Housecar, displayed in the RV/MH Hall of Fame in Elkhart, Indiana.

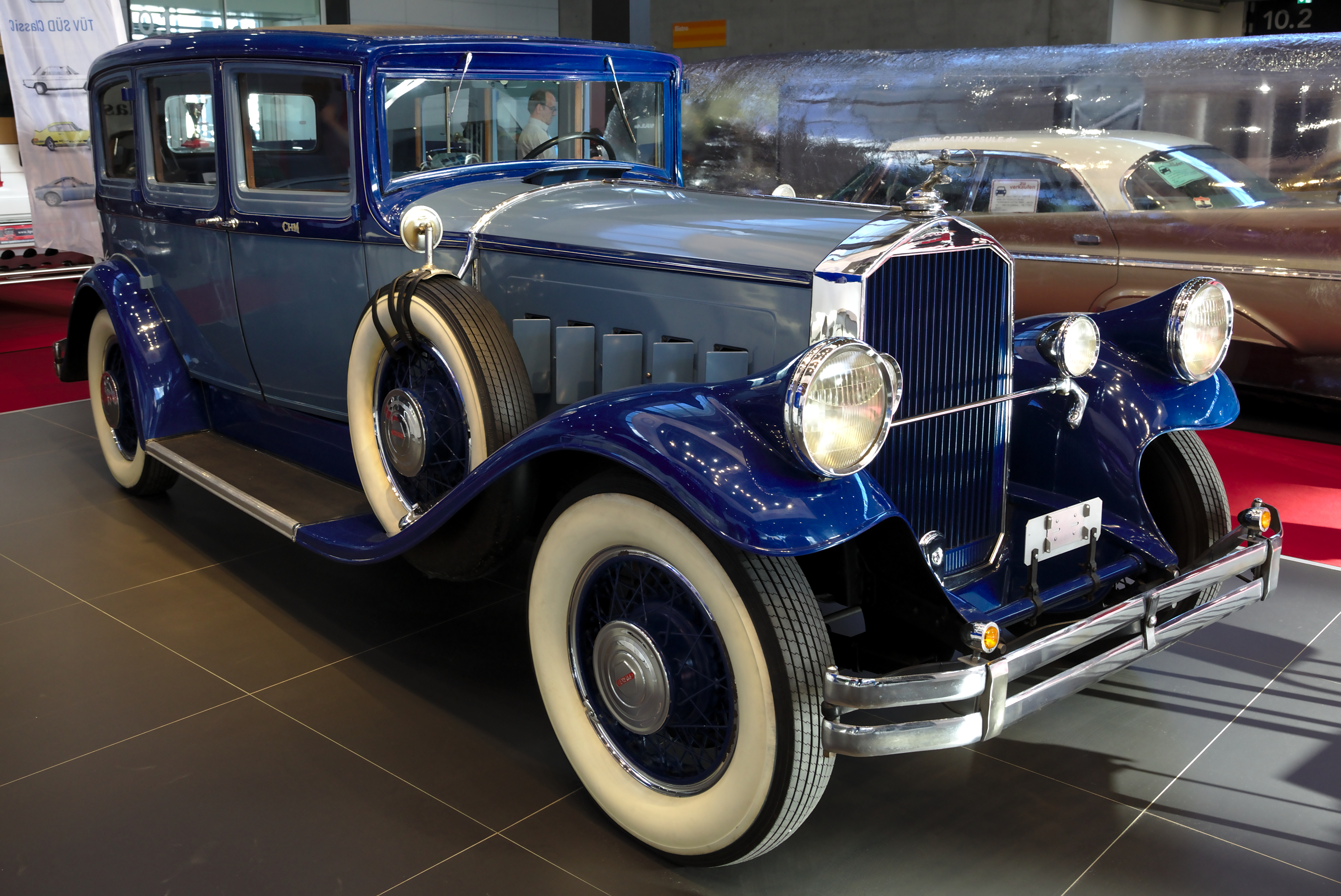
1930 Pierce-Arrow Model B

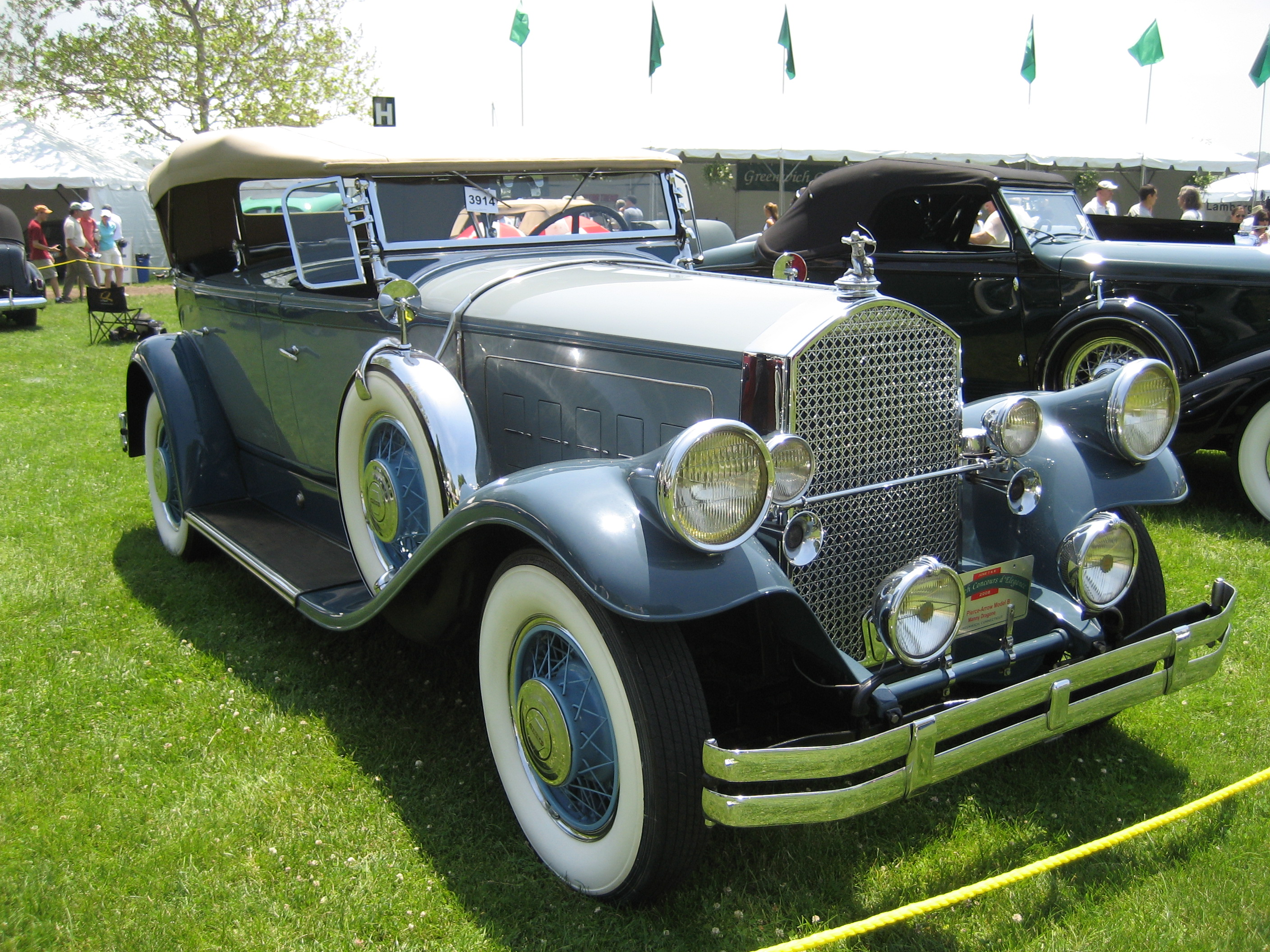
1930 Pierce-Arrow Model B Dual-Cowl Phaeton

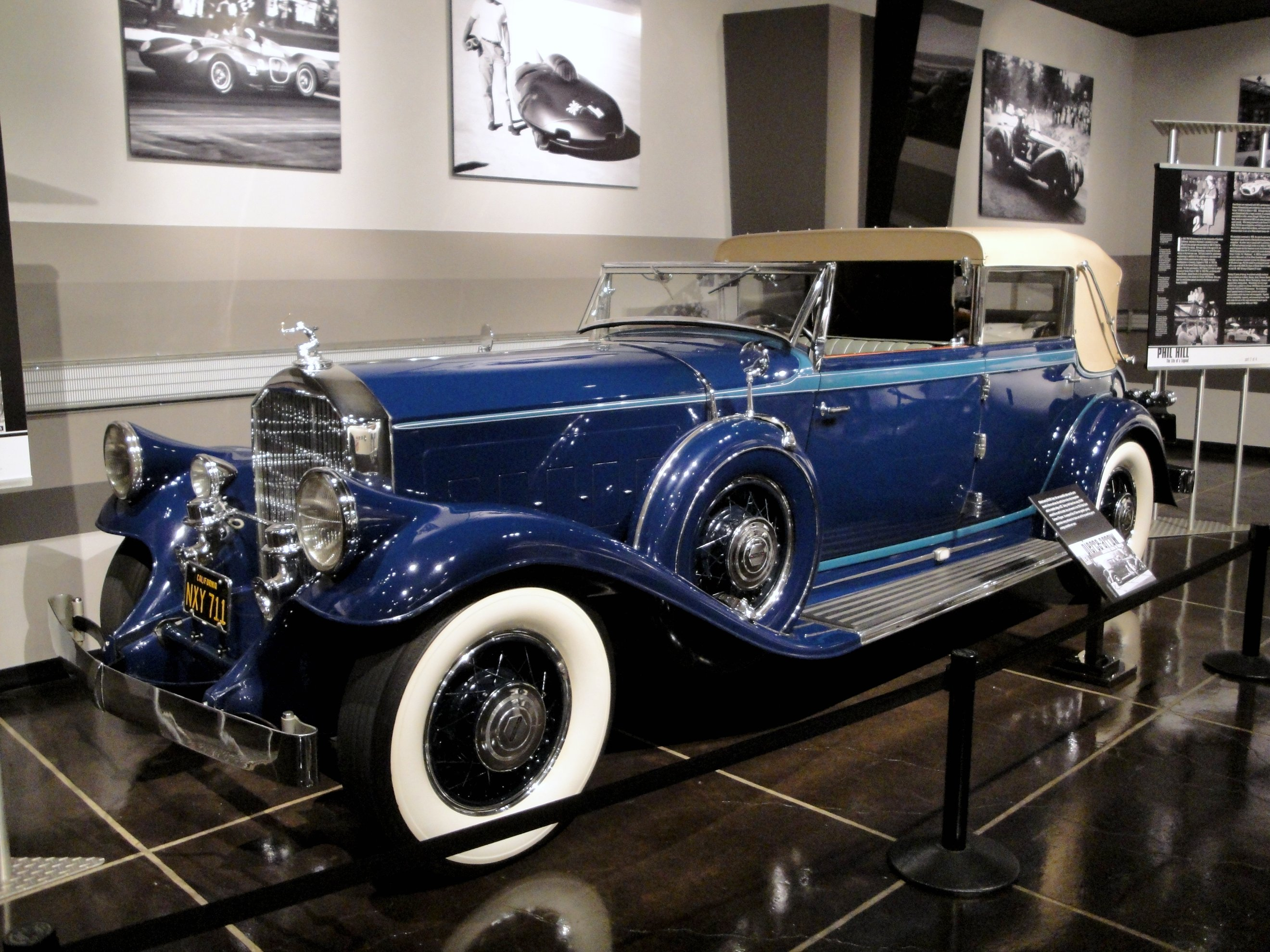
1931 Pierce-Arrow by LeBaron

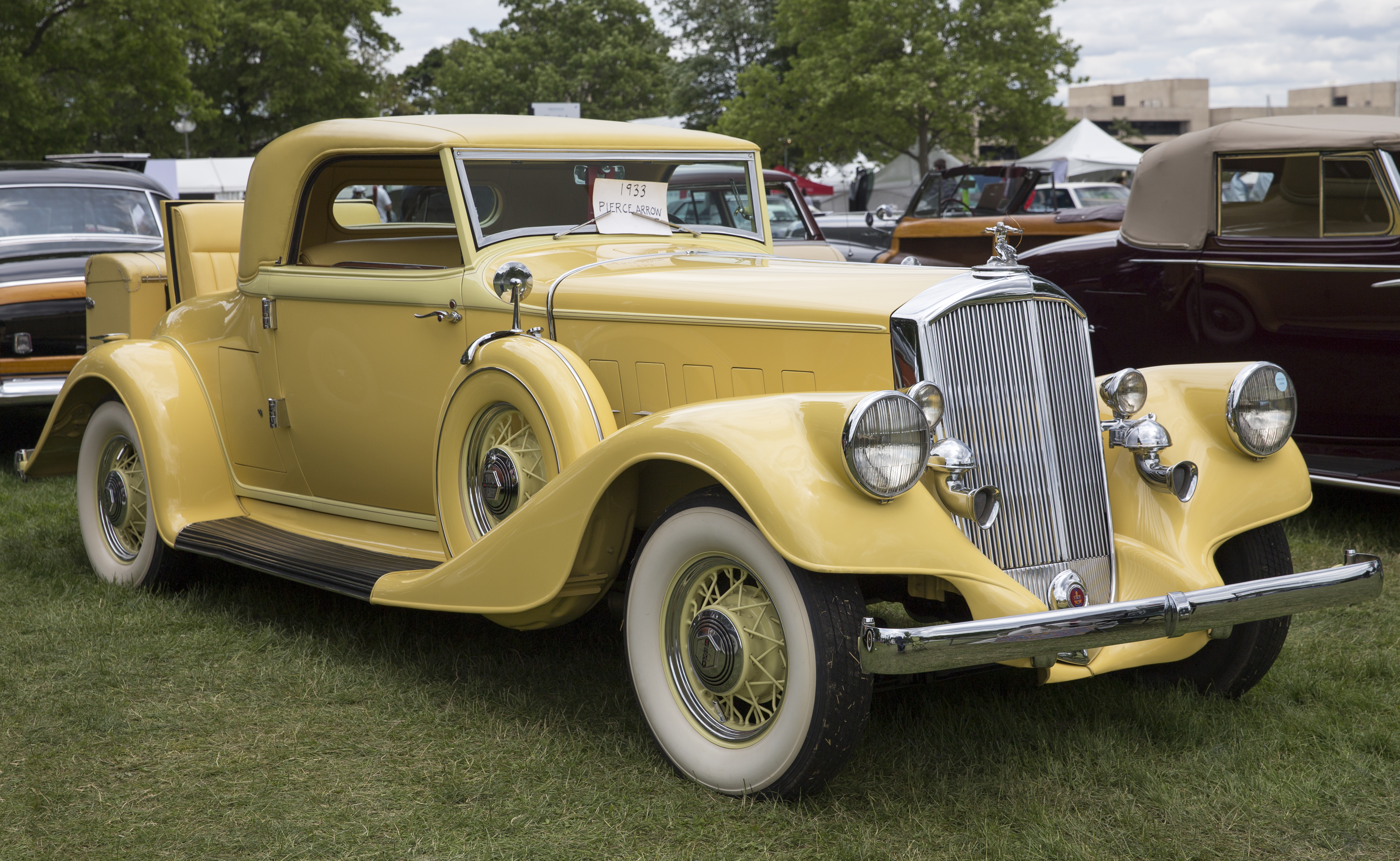
Pierce-Arrow Twelve (1240)

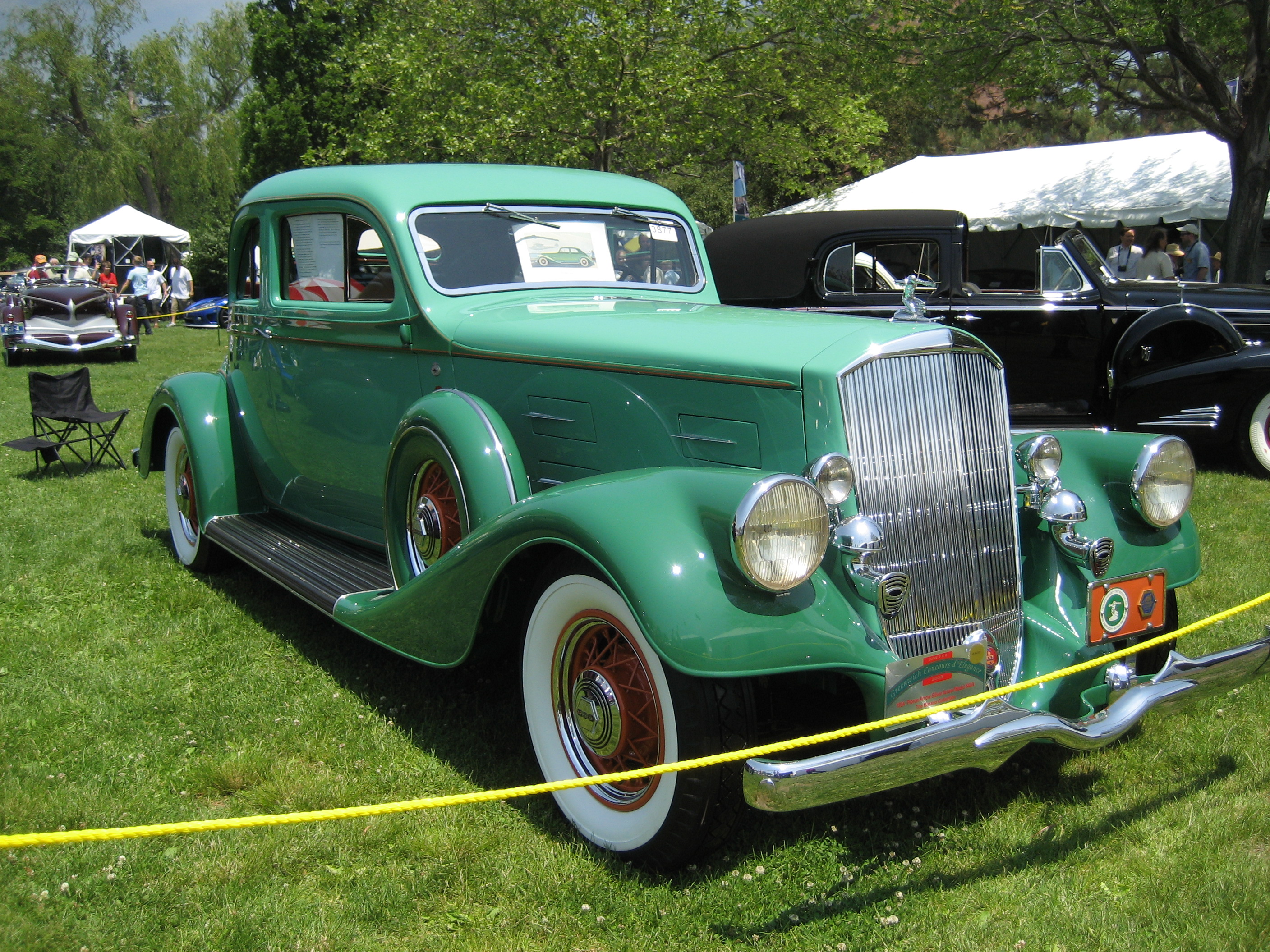
1934 Pierce-Arrow Eight (840A) Coupe

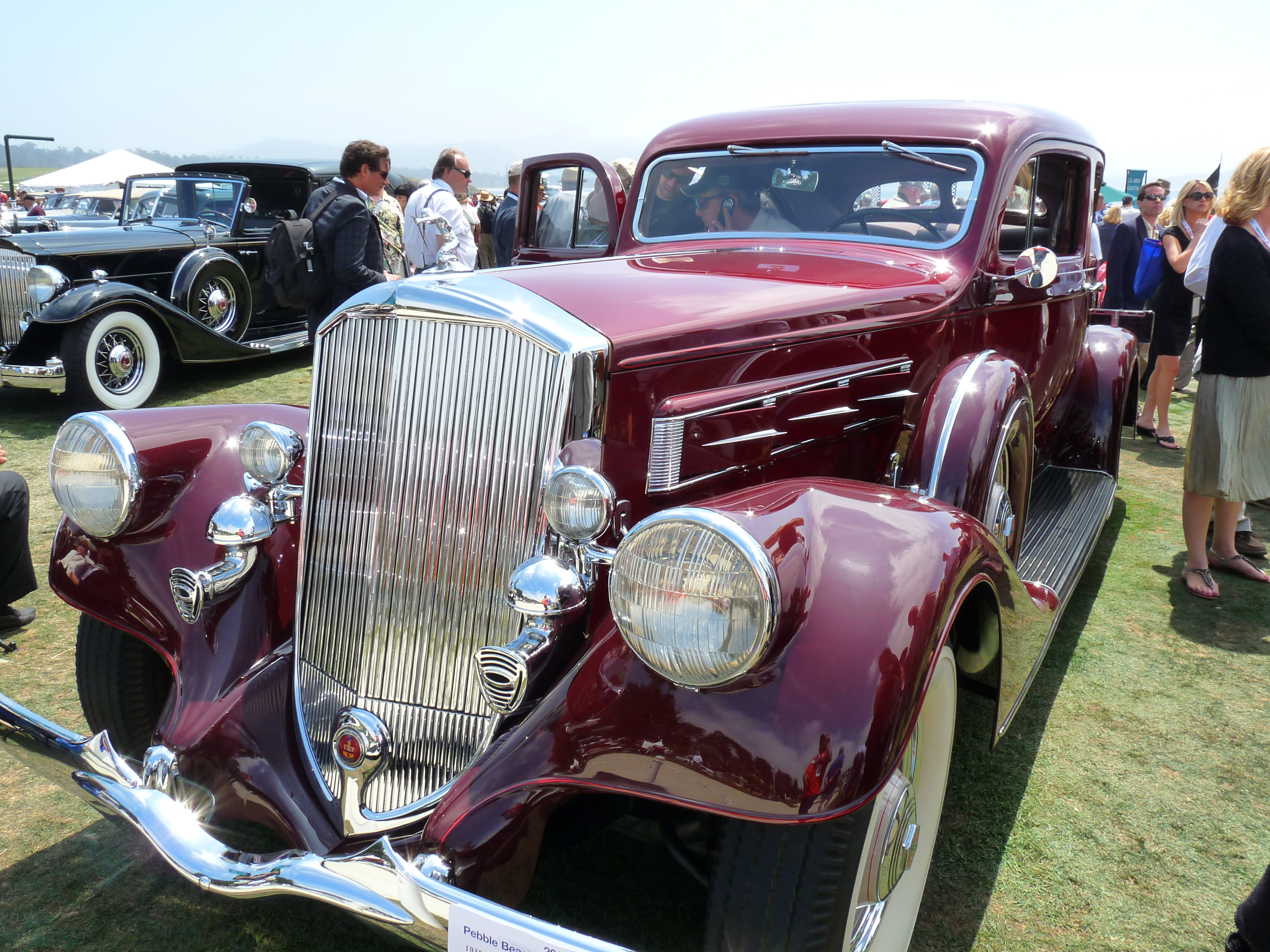
1935 Pierce Arrow 845 V12 Silver Arrow Coupe

== See also ==
- List of automobile manufacturers
- List of defunct automobile manufacturers
- Pierce-Arrow Town Car
- Pierce-Arrow armoured AA lorry
- Pierce Silver Arrow
