= Gold Hill, Colorado =

Census-designated place in Boulder County, CO, USA

Gold Hill
- Census-designated place
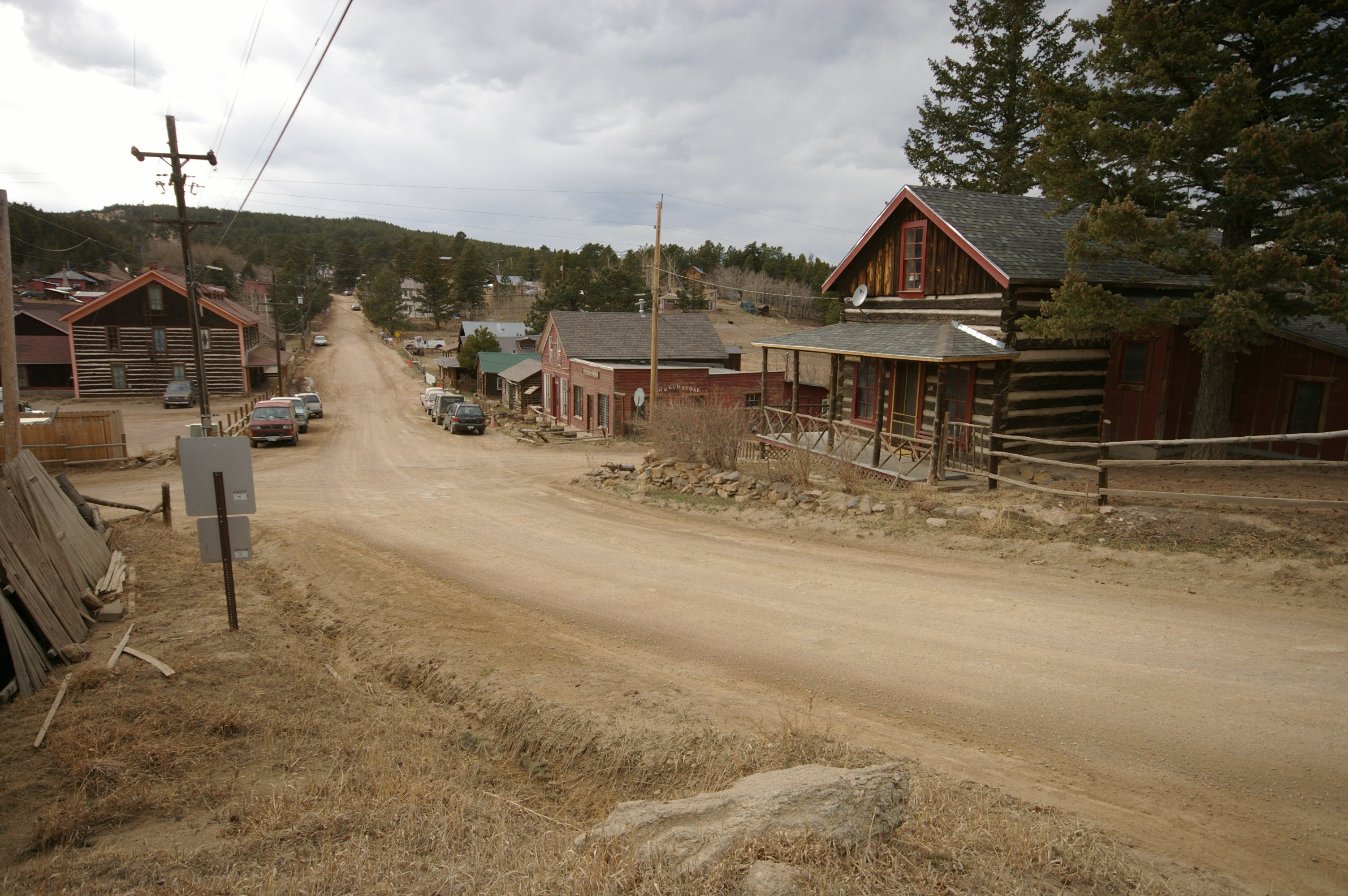
- Gold Hill, Colorado.

- Location of the Gold Hill CDP in Boulder County, Colorado
- Coordinates: 40°03′35″N 105°25′08″W
- Country: United States
- State: Colorado
- County: Boulder County
- Founded: 1859

Government
  - Type: unincorporated community

Area
  - Total: 2.075 sq mi (5.374 km^{2})
  - Land: 2.075 sq mi (5.374 km^{2})
  - Water: 0 sq mi (0.000 km^{2})
- Elevation: 8,455 ft (2,577 m)

Population (2020)
  - Total: 218
  - Density: 105/sq mi (40.6/km^{2})
- Time zone: UTC-7 (MST)
  - Summer (DST): UTC-6 (MDT)
- ZIP Code: Boulder 80302
- Area codes: 303 & 720
- GNIS feature: 2408304
- Gold Hill Historic District
- U.S. National Register of Historic Places
- U.S. Historic district
- Colorado State Register of Historic Properties
- Location: Roughly bounded by North St., Pine St., Boulder St., Gold Run St., and College St.
- Built: 1872
- Architectural style: Late 19th And 20th Century Revivals
- MPS: Metal Mining and Tourist Era Resources of Boulder County MPS
- NRHP reference No.: 89000979
- CSRHP No.: 5BL.769
- Added to NRHP: August 3, 1989

Gold Hill is an unincorporated community and a census-designated place (CDP) located in and governed by Boulder County, Colorado, United States. The CDP is a part of the Boulder, CO Metropolitan Statistical Area. The population of the Gold Hill CDP was 218 at the United States Census 2020. The Boulder post office (Zip Code 80302) serves the area.

Gold Hill is located to the northwest of Boulder, perched on a mountainside above Left Hand Canyon at an elevation of 8,300 feet. Originally a mining camp, it was the site of the first major discovery of gold during the 1859 Colorado Gold Rush and remained an important mining camp throughout the late 19th century, with a population approaching 1500 at its height, before falling into decline. It has been revived somewhat in recent years as a quiet, isolated haven, but easily accessible by dirt roads. The town contains numerous historic wooden structures, some restored in recent years, as well as decaying ruins from its mining heyday. It has a small museum and two-room schoolhouse, the Gold Hill School, which since 1873 has been the oldest continuously operating public school in Colorado. Other businesses include a General Store and the Gold Hill Inn, a restored inn listed on the National Register of Historic Places. The town is laid out on a small grid of unpaved streets.

Gold Hill is accessible from nearby Left Hand Canyon Road via Lick Skillet Road. Easier approaches to Gold Hill include Sunshine Canyon Road from 4th and Mapleton in Boulder, Gold Run Road from Salina (on Four Mile Canyon Road), and Gold Hill Road from the Peak to Peak Highway (State Highway 72) south of Ward. All of these roads are susceptible to heavy snows during the winter, which at times render Gold Hill inaccessible to vehicles not equipped with chains or four-wheel drive.

Gold Hill is sometimes labeled a ghost town, which is an inaccurate designation. Gold Hill is part of unincorporated Boulder County, and while it does not have a municipal government, it does have an active town meeting with elected officials.

== History ==
The community is located above Gold Run, the first lode discovery of gold in Colorado (at that time the area was part of the Nebraska Territory) on January 15, 1859. The discovery occurred nearly simultaneously with prospecting in Gregory Gulch and Clear Creek, but these latter discoveries were not exploited until later that Spring. On March 7, 1859, the Gold Run discovery became the first mining district in the region (named either the Mountain District No. 1, Mining District No. 1 of the Nebraska Territory, or the Nebraska Gold Hill Mining District, according to various historical sources). Word quickly spread among miners in the region, prompting a flood of new arrivals and the establishment of Gold Hill as the first permanent mining camp in present-day Colorado. By autumn, a quartz stamp mill was erected at the base of the hill, the first such piece of equipment in the region, one that had been transported by ox cart westward over the Great Plains. The first productive vein was the Scott, followed quickly by the Horsfal, Alamakee, and Cold Spring. Nearby placers were also worked for the gold in stream beds.

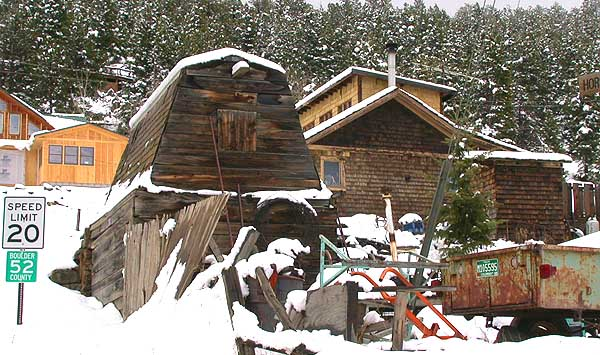
Modern residences around ruins of historic mining structures in Gold Hill

By 1861, the year of the organization of the Colorado Territory, the surface deposits of gold in the vicinity of the town were largely played out, resulting in a temporary exodus of prospectors and a population decrease. The town was somewhat revived later that year by the construction of the Hill smelter at nearby Black Hawk, allowing the treatment of lower-grade ores.

The discovery of tellurium in the area in 1872 prompted a second boom, bringing the population to nearly 1000 once again. At its height, the town had a newspaper and a number of hotels, including the Mines Hotel, built in 1872 and recently restored as a summer tourist destination. The Mines was immortalized in verse by poet Eugene Field, who stayed at the hotel while working as a newspaperman in Denver. The town population dwindled in the early 20th century as the mining tapered off. The town has experienced two major fires in its history, but it nevertheless retains many of its historic wooden structures.

Despite a dwindling permanent population, Gold Hill continued to remain attractive to tourists. Around 1926 Florence Molloy and Mabel MacLeay, previously the owners of the Molloy-MacLeay taxicab company in Boulder, CO, opened the Double M Dude Ranch (or M&M ranch, then Trojan Ranch, and now the Colorado Mountain Ranch) in Gold Hill, CO. The Syracuse Herald, described the Double M as offering, “all the attractions of the open spaces of the West sufficiently tempered with luxuries to meet the requirement of Easterners.” The Double MM operated until World War II when it was sold in 1941 and subsequently became the Trojan Ranch and then later the Colorado Mountain Ranch (currently in operation).

In 1921, The Holiday House Association of Chicago, started by Jean Sherwood, purchased the hotel at Gold Hill, now the Gold Hill Inn, to create a summer camp destination for self-supporting single women from Chicago. These vacationing women were referred to as "Bluebirds." The Bluebird Lodge addition to the hotel was completed around 1926.

In September 2010, the Four Mile Canyon wildfire destroyed approximately 170 homes in and around Gold Hill.

== Geography ==
The Gold Hill CDP has an area of 1,328 acres (5.374 km^{2}), all land.

== Demographics ==
The United States Census Bureau initially defined the Gold Hill CDP for the United States Census 2000.

Gold Hill CDP, Colorado
Year	Pop.	±%
2000	210	—
2010	230	+9.5%
2020	218	−5.2%
Source: United States Census Bureau

== See also ==
- Boulder, CO Metropolitan Statistical Area
