= Pierce-Arrow Town Car =

1905 automobile produced by Pierce-Arrow

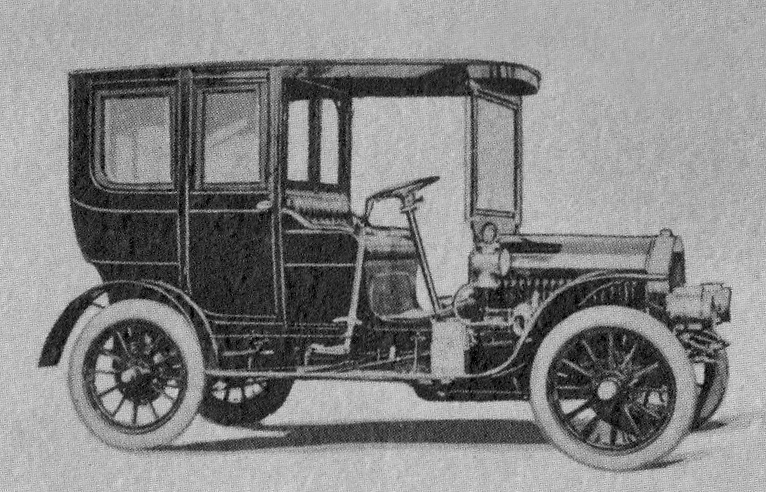
1905 Pierce-Arrow

The Pierce-Arrow Town Car was an automobile produced from 1905 to 1938 by Pierce-Arrow. They were produced in three models: the Brougham Town Car, Metropolitan Town Car and Limousine Landau Town Car. Pierce-Arrow Town Cars were predominantly owned by the very wealthy, including the royal families of Japan, Persia, Saudi Arabia, Greece, and Belgium.

== Models ==
- 1905: The first Town Car was introduced. Their distinctive radiator design first appeared in this model and remained in Pierce-Arrows until the last car was manufactured. Features included gas lamps, double windshield and luxurious coachwork.
- 1921: The Limousine Landau was produced. This car had greater comfort and all-weather motoring by producing more cars of the closed type. This car seated seven passengers and was one of Pierce-Arrow's finest in the early 1920s.
- 1934: The Metropolitan Town Car was mounted on either the eight- or twelve-cylinder Pierce-Arrow chassis. The eight cylinder model had 150 horsepower. The twelve cylinder model had 185 horsepower.
