= Left Hand Canyon =

Canyon near Boulder, Colorado

Coordinates: 40°06′37″N 105°18′22″W

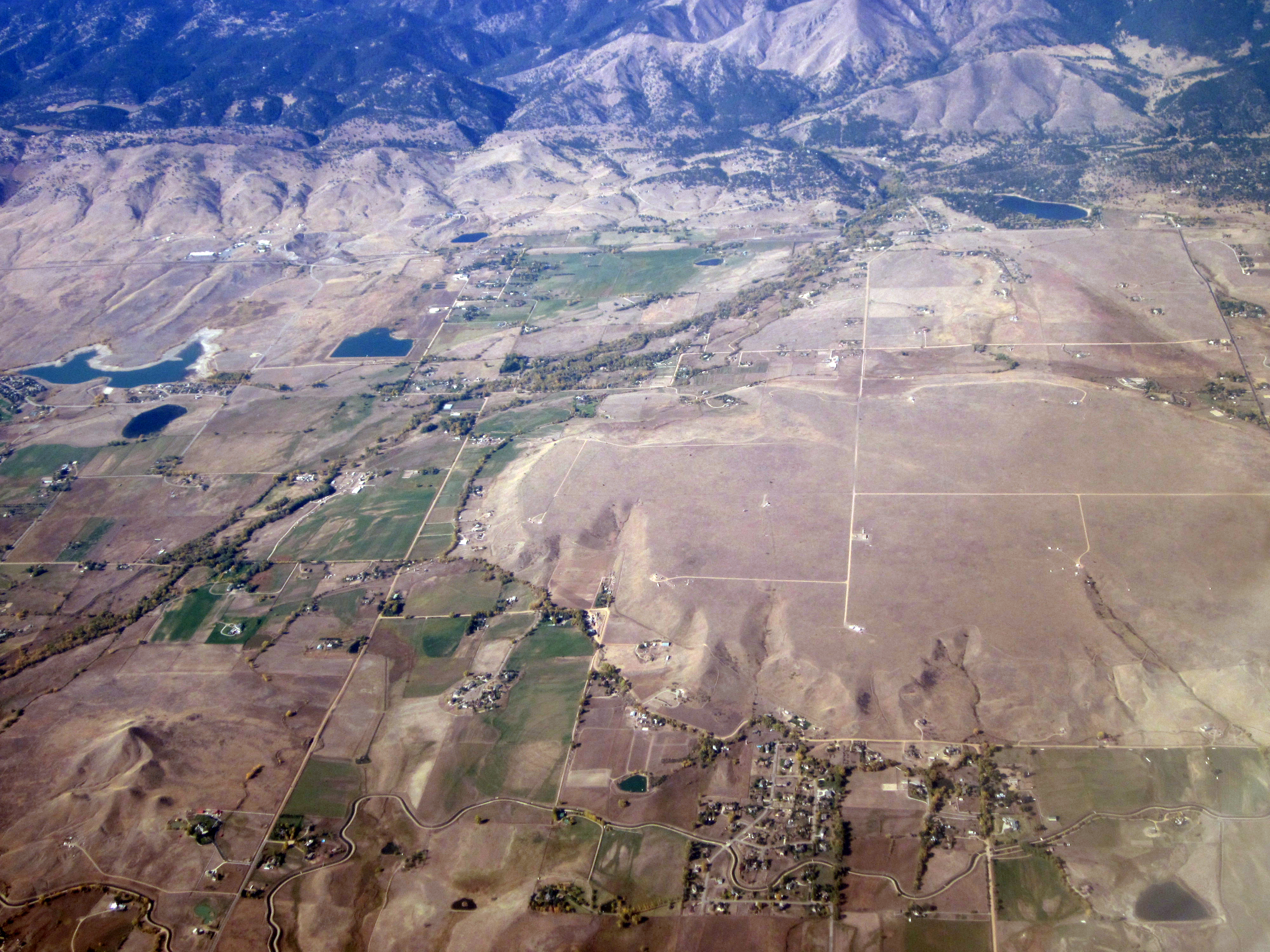
Left Hand Creek and Canyon. Aerial photo by Doc Searls

Left Hand Canyon is a canyon, near Boulder, Colorado, United States.

== The area ==
It is a natural area, and has much wildlife.

== Uses ==
It has been used for offroading, but along with target shooting, this is now forbidden.

== See also ==
- Left Hand Creek (Colorado)
