= Lip dub =

Type of music video

Lip dub made by young navarres in Alsasua, Navarre, to celebrate the 20th anniversary of their gaztetxe, or "youth house"

A lip dub is a type of music video that combines lip synching and audio dubbing (copying audio from an existing recording) to make a music video. It is made by filming individuals or a group of people lip synching while listening to a song or any recorded audio then dubbing over it in post editing with the original audio of the song. There is often some form of mobile audio device used such as an MP3 player. Often they look like simple music videos, although many involve much preparation and production. Lip dubs are usually done in a single unedited shot that often travel through different rooms and situations within a building. They have become popular with the advent of mass participatory video content sites like YouTube.

== Origin ==
Although lip dubbing in music videos was not a new concept, Jake Lodwick, the co-founder of Vimeo, coined the term "lip dubbing" on December 14, 2006, in a video entitled Lip Dubbing: Endless Dream. In the video's description, he wrote, "I walked around with a song playing in my headphones, and recorded myself singing. When I got home I opened it in iMovie and added an MP3 of the actual song, and synchronized it with my video. Is there a name for this? If not, I suggest 'lip dubbing'." Lodwick subsequently directed the "Flagpole Sitta" "office lip dub" in April 2007 which The Washington Post covered. What is relatively new is the modern speed accuracy of both the audio player and the video camcorder or smartphone that, without the elaborate linking equipment of the past, are able to maintain synchronization of audio & video over several minutes or more.

Students in the Digital Media department at Hochschule Furtwangen produced the first university lip dub.

Since then, dozens of lip dubs have been coordinated around the world by students. After L'Université du Québec à Montréal (UQAM) produced a lip dub to The Black Eyed Peas' "I Gotta Feeling" in 2009, the viral video phenomenon gained international acclaim.

The use of camera stabilization hardware is commonly used to provide an easy-to-watch and smooth final product.

== Content ==
Tom Johnson, a technical writer who blogs about Web 2.0's effect on communication, describes a good lip dub as having the characteristics, or at least the appearance, of spontaneity, authenticity, group participation and fun.

== Other uses ==
In September 2010, the season première of The Office ("Nepotism") begins with the workers of the Scranton branch of Dunder Mifflin Paper Company doing a lip dub of The Human Beinz's "Nobody but Me" through the office.

The record of most people participating at a lip dub is 9,300 on May 31, 2012 in Lindsay, Ontario. The Lindsay LipDub surpassed the previous record of 5,771, which was on October 24, 2010 in the town of Vic. The previous record was set to the rhythm of La Flama by the Valencian band Obrint Pas and is called Lipdub per la Independència de Catalunya "Lipdub for the Independence of Catalonia" The record is not recognised by Guinness.

On May 22, 2011, director Rob Bliss and producer Scott Seven made a video called Grand Rapids Lip Dub in response to a Newsweek article that listed Grand Rapids, Michigan #10 on a list of "America's Dying Cities." The video was labeled by Roger Ebert of the Chicago Sun-Times as "The greatest music video ever made." The nearly nine-minute video used 5,000 citizens of the city lip-synching to Don McLean's "American Pie". Released via YouTube on May 26, 2011, the video received over 2 million views in the first week and was the ninth-most-viewed YouTube video on May 28, 2011. Since its 2011 release, the video has been viewed over 5 million times.

Similarly, on May 31, 2012, Stratta Creative made a lip dub video called Lindsay LipDub with the goal of becoming Canada's first citywide lip dub, as well as a world record holder for most participants (with 9300 participants), in the community of Lindsay, Ontario. The City of Kawartha Lakes, of which Lindsay is a community, was listed as #188 of 190 cities in Canada by MoneySense, and the community gathered to perform a lip dub, promoted by Rick Mercer, George Stroumboulopoulos, Craig Kielburger, Dan Kanter and Hedley (band).

Historically, miming vocals of pre-recorded music in a video was termed "lip-synching." It dates back to Hollywood musicals, Junior High School talent shows, and Dick Clark's "American Bandstand" on television. Conventionally, the term "dub" means an audio copy, or "dubbing," as in dialog replacement, today called "Automatic Dialog Replacement" (ADR). Previously film dubbing was done by "looping," where a few seconds of motion picture corresponding to individual lines was repeatedly projected as spliced loops of film, while an actor repeatedly spoke the line into audio recorder with an identical length loops of magnetic film; for each line, the process was abruptly halted when finally a good take was recorded, then on to the next loop.
