= Nobody but Me =

Nobody but Me may refer to:

- Nobody but Me (Human Beinz album), 1968
- Nobody but Me (Michael Bublé album), 2016
  - "Nobody but Me" (Michael Bublé song), 2016
- "Nobody but Me" (Blake Shelton song), 2005
- "Nobody but Me" (The Isley Brothers song), covered by The Human Beinz among others
- "Nobody but Me", a song written by Doc Pomus and Mort Shuman and recorded by The Drifters, the B-side of the single "Save the Last Dance for Me"
- "Nobody but Me", a song by Save Ferris from the album It Means Everything
- "Nobody but Me", a song by Laurel Aitken
- "Nobody but Me", a song written by Billy Myles, recorded by Lou Rawls

== See also ==
- "Everybody Loves My Baby", a 1924 song one might wrongly think is entitled "Nobody but Me"
- Nobody but You (disambiguation)
