= Steve McQueen =

American actor (1930–1980)

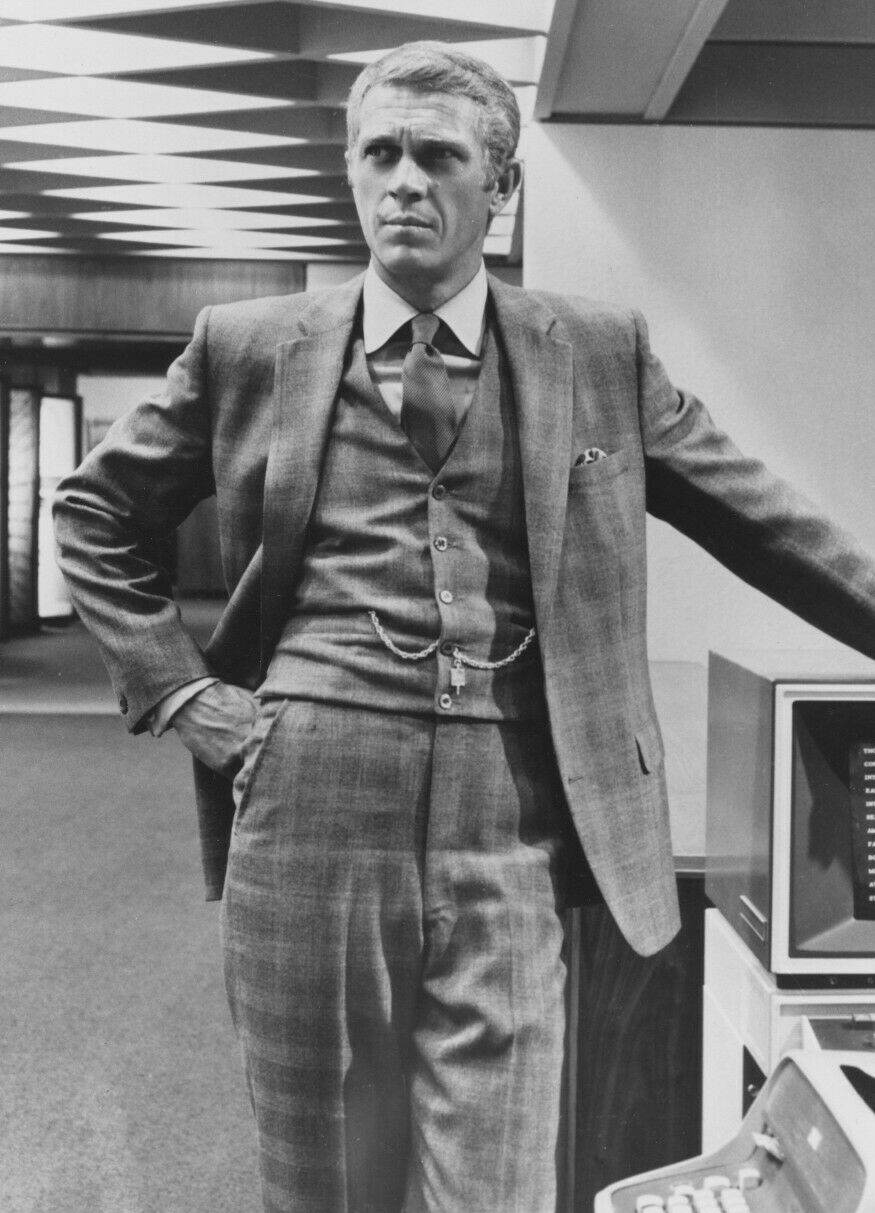
- McQueen in The Thomas Crown Affair, 1968
- Born: Terrence Stephen McQueen; March 24, 1930; Beech Grove, Indiana, U.S.
- Died: November 7, 1980 (aged 50); Ciudad Juárez, Mexico
- Occupation: Actor
- Years active: 1952–1980
- Spouses: Neile Adams (m. 1956; div. 1972); Ali MacGraw (m. 1973; div. 1978); Barbara Minty (m. 1980)
- Children: 2, including Chad McQueen
- Relatives: Steven R. McQueen (grandson)
- Military career
- Branch: United States Marine Corps; United States Merchant Marine
- Service years: 1946 (Merchant Marine); 1947–1950 (USMC)
- Rank: Private first class

Signature
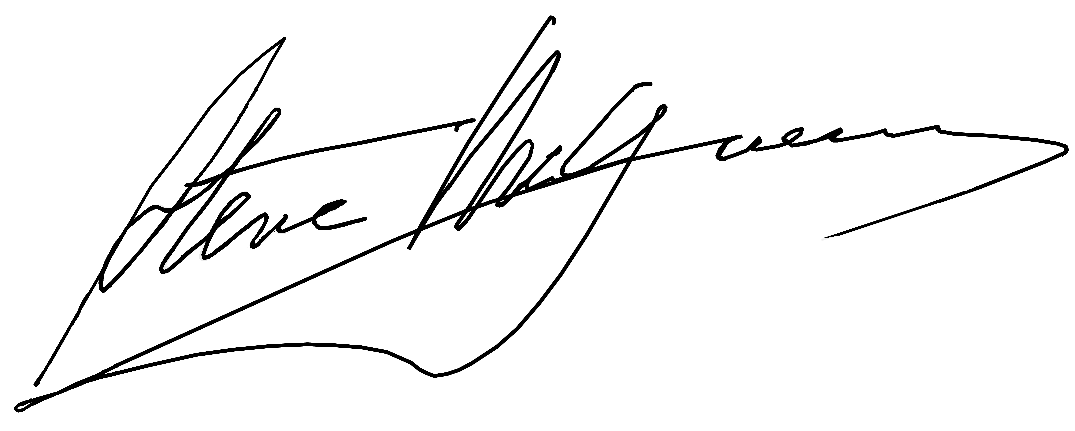

Terrence Stephen McQueen (March 24, 1930 – November 7, 1980) was an American actor. His antihero persona, emphasized during the height of 1960s counterculture, made him a top box office draw for his films of the late 1950s to the mid-1970s. He was nicknamed the "King of Cool" and used the alias "Harvey Mushman" when participating in motor races.

McQueen received nominations for an Academy Award, Golden Globe Award and a Laurel Award for his role in Robert Wise's epic 1920s drama The Sand Pebbles (1966). His other popular films include The Blob (1958), The Cincinnati Kid (1965), Nevada Smith (1966), The Thomas Crown Affair (1968), Bullitt (1968), The Getaway (1972) and Papillon (1973), in addition to ensemble films such as The Magnificent Seven (1960), The Great Escape (1963)—a turn which earned him both a Moscow International Film Festival Award and a Laurel Award nomination—On Any Sunday (1971), and the box office smash-hit The Towering Inferno (1974). He became the world's highest-paid movie star in 1974; however, afterwards, he did not appear in a film for another four years. Although he was combative with directors and producers, his popularity placed him in high demand and enabled him to negotiate the largest salaries.

Diagnosed with terminal cancer, McQueen flew to Mexico in October 1980 for surgery to remove or reduce tumors in his neck and abdomen, against the advice of U.S. doctors who warned him that his cancer was inoperable and that his heart could not withstand the surgery. A few weeks later, he checked in to a hospital in Ciudad Juárez under a fake name and underwent surgery by hospital staff who were unaware of his true identity. A few hours after surgery, he died of a heart attack at the age of 50.

== Early life ==
Terrence Stephen McQueen was born at the former St. Francis Hospital in Beech Grove, Indiana, on March 24, 1930, the son of Julia Ann (or Julianne) Crawford and flying circus stunt pilot William McQueen. He was of Scottish descent and grew up in a Catholic household. He was raised by his mother, after being abandoned by his father when he was six months old. Several biographers have stated that his mother was an alcoholic. Unable to cope with caring for him, she decided in 1933 to leave him with her parents Lillian and Victor in Slater, Missouri. As the Great Depression worsened, McQueen and his grandparents moved in with Lillian's brother Claude and his family at their farm in Slater. McQueen later said that he had good memories of living on the farm, noting that his great-uncle Claude was a "very good, very strong, [and] very fair" man from whom he "learned a lot".

Claude gave McQueen a red tricycle on his fourth birthday, which McQueen subsequently credited with sparking his early interest in car racing. His mother, who had since married, brought McQueen from the farm to live with her and his stepfather in Indianapolis when he was eight years old. He later recalled, "The day I left the farm, Uncle Claude gave me a personal going-away present—a gold pocket watch, with an inscription inside the case." The inscription read: "To Steve, who has been a son to me." Dyslexic and partially deaf due to a childhood ear infection, McQueen did not adjust well to school or his new life, and his stepfather beat him to such an extent that he left home to live on the streets at the age of nine. He later said, "When a kid doesn't have any love when he's small, he begins to wonder if he's good enough. My mother didn't love me, and I didn't have a father. I thought, 'Well, I must not be very good.'"

Julia wrote to Claude when McQueen was 12, asking that he be returned to her again to live in Los Angeles, where she now lived with her second husband. By McQueen's own account, he and his new stepfather "locked horns immediately". McQueen recalls him being "a prime son of a bitch" who was not averse to beating both McQueen and Julia. McQueen began to rebel again and was sent back to live with Claude for a final time. At age 14, he left Claude's farm without saying goodbye and joined a circus for a short time. He drifted back to his mother and stepfather in Los Angeles, resuming his life as a gang member and petty criminal. He was caught stealing hubcaps by the police and handed over to his stepfather, who beat him severely and threw him down a flight of stairs. McQueen looked up at his stepfather and said, "You lay your stinking hands on me again and I swear I'll kill you."

After this incident, McQueen's stepfather persuaded his mother to sign a court order saying that McQueen was incorrigible, remanding him to the California Junior Boys Republic in Chino Hills. McQueen began to change and mature there, but he was not popular with the other boys at first: "Say the boys had a chance once a month to load into a bus and go into town to see a movie. And they lost out because one guy in the bungalow didn't get his work done right. Well, you can pretty well guess they're gonna have something to say about that. I paid my dues with the other fellows quite a few times. I got my lumps, no doubt about it. The other guys in the bungalow had ways of paying you back for interfering with their well-being."

McQueen gradually became a role model and was elected to the Boys Council, a group that set the rules and regulations governing the boys' lives. He left the Boys Republic at age 16. When he later became famous as an actor, he regularly returned to talk to resident boys and retained a lifelong association with the center. At age 16, he returned to live with his mother, who had since moved to New York City's Greenwich Village. He met two sailors from the Merchant Marine there and decided to sign on to a ship bound for the Dominican Republic. Once there, he abandoned his new post and was eventually employed at a brothel. He later ventured to Texas and drifted from job to job, including selling pens at a traveling carnival and working as a lumberjack in Canada. Upon his arrest for vagrancy in the Deep South, McQueen served a 30-day assignment on a chain gang.

In 1947, after receiving permission from his mother since he was not yet 18 years old, McQueen enlisted in the U.S. Marines and was sent to Parris Island, South Carolina, for boot camp. He was promoted to private first class and assigned to an armored unit. He initially struggled with conforming to the discipline of the service and later said, "I was busted back down to private about seven times". He took an unauthorized absence, failing to return after a weekend pass expired, and was caught by the shore patrol while staying with his girlfriend, Barbara Ross, for two weeks. After resisting arrest, he was sentenced to 41 days in the brig.

After this, McQueen resolved to focus his energies on self-improvement and embraced the Marines' discipline. He saved the lives of five other Marines during an Arctic exercise, pulling them from a tank before it broke through ice into the sea. He was assigned to the honor guard responsible for guarding USS Williamsburg, the presidential yacht of Harry S. Truman. He served until 1950, when he was honorably discharged. He later said he had enjoyed his time in the Marines, remembering it as a formative time in his life: "The Marines made a man out of me. I learned how to get along with others, and I had a platform to jump off."

== Acting career ==
=== 1950s ===
In 1952, with financial assistance under the G.I. Bill, McQueen began studying acting in New York at Sanford Meisner's Neighborhood Playhouse and at HB Studio under Uta Hagen. He reportedly delivered his first dialogue on a theater stage in a 1952 play produced by Yiddish theater star Molly Picon. McQueen's character spoke one brief line: "Alts iz farloyrn." ("All is lost.") During this time, he also studied acting with Stella Adler, in whose class he met Gia Scala.

Long enamored of cars and motorcycles, McQueen began to earn money by competing in weekend motorcycle races at Long Island City Raceway. He purchased the first two of many motorcycles, a Harley-Davidson and a Triumph. He soon became an excellent racer, winning about $100 each weekend (equivalent to $1,200 in 2025). He appeared as a musical judge in an episode of ABC's Jukebox Jury, which aired in the 1953–1954 season.

McQueen had minor roles in stage productions, including Peg o' My Heart, The Member of the Wedding and Two Fingers of Pride. He made his Broadway debut in 1955 in the play A Hatful of Rain starring Ben Gazzara. In late 1955, McQueen left New York and headed for Los Angeles. He moved into a house on Vestal Avenue in the Echo Park area, and sought acting jobs in Hollywood.

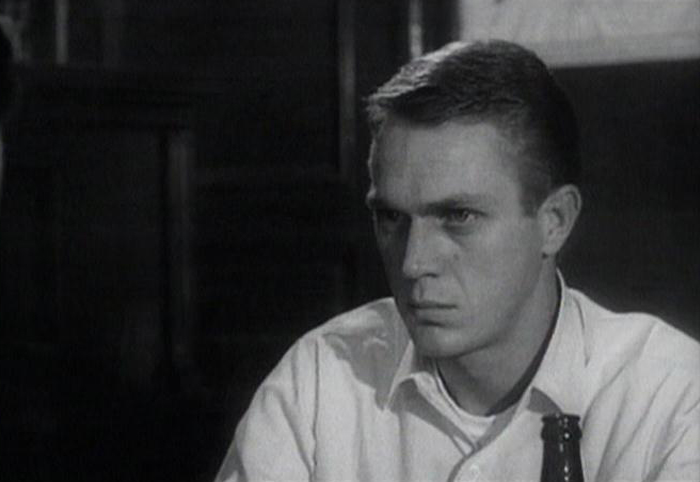
McQueen in The Great St. Louis Bank Robbery (1959)

When McQueen appeared in a two-part Westinghouse Studio One television presentation entitled "The Defender", Hollywood manager Hilly Elkins took note of him and decided that B movies would be a good place for the young actor to make his mark. McQueen's first film role under Elkins' management was a bit part in Somebody Up There Likes Me (1956), directed by Robert Wise and starring Paul Newman. McQueen was subsequently hired for the films The Blob (his first leading role), Never Love a Stranger, and The Great St. Louis Bank Robbery (1959).

McQueen's first breakout role came on television. He appeared on Dale Robertson's NBC Western series Tales of Wells Fargo as Bill Longley. Elkins, then McQueen's manager, successfully lobbied Vincent M. Fennelly, producer of the Western series Trackdown, to have McQueen read for the part of bounty hunter Josh Randall. He first appeared in "The Bounty Hunter", episode 21 of the first season of Trackdown in 1958. He appeared as Randall in that episode, cast opposite series lead Robert Culp, a former New York motorcycle racing buddy. McQueen appeared again on Trackdown in "The Brothers", episode 31 of the same season, in which he played twin brothers, one of whom was an outlaw sought by Culp's character, Hoby Gilman.

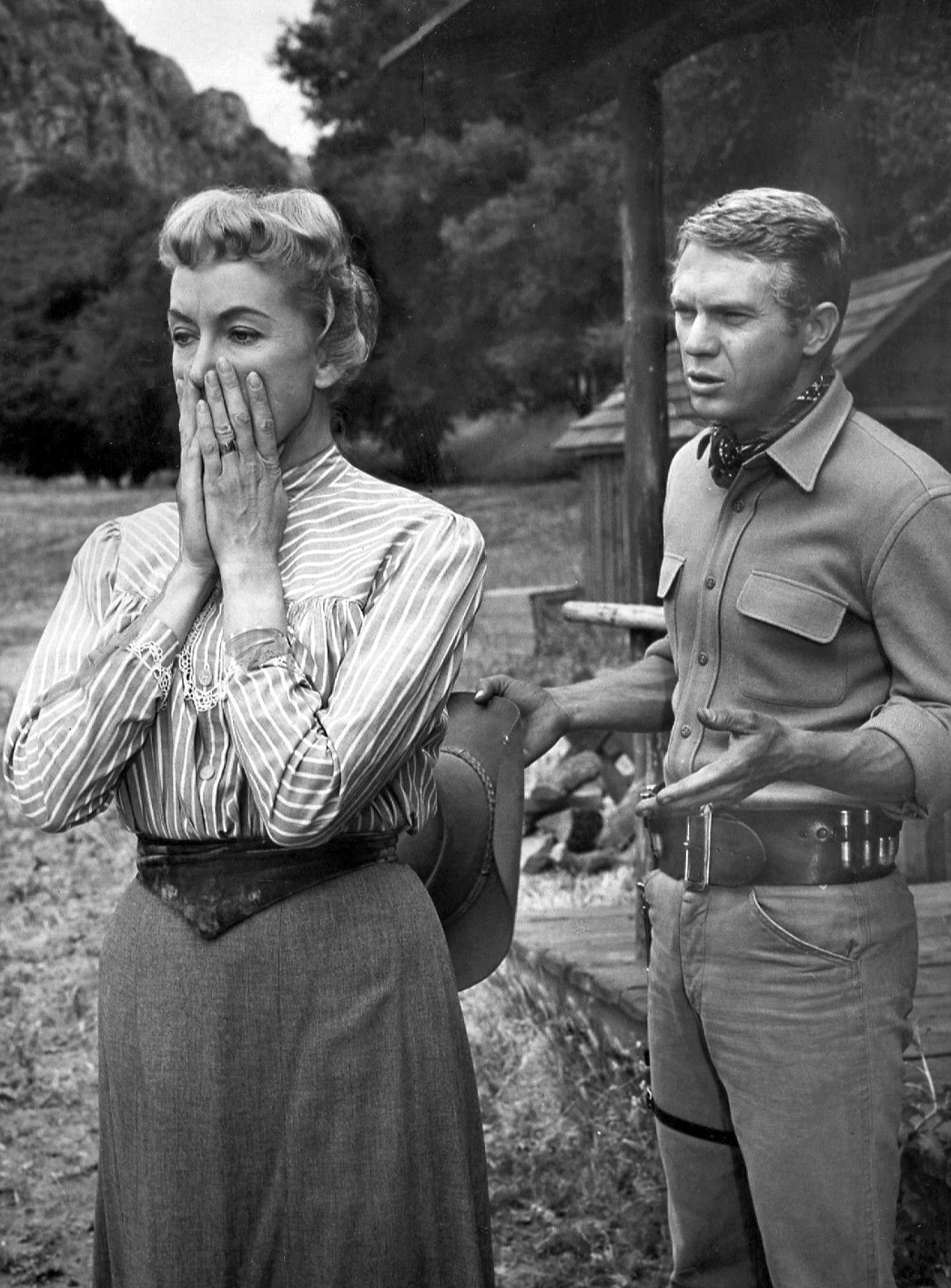
Virginia Gregg with McQueen in Wanted: Dead or Alive, 1959

McQueen next filmed a pilot episode for what became the series, Wanted Dead or Alive, which aired on CBS in September 1958. It became his breakout role. In interviews associated with the DVD release of Wanted: Dead or Alive, Robert Culp of Trackdown claimed credit for bringing McQueen to Hollywood and landing him the part of Randall. He said he taught McQueen the "art of the fast-draw". Culp said that by the second day of filming, McQueen beat him at it.

McQueen became a household name as a result of the series. Randall's special holster held a sawed-off .44–40 Winchester rifle (nicknamed the "Mare's Leg") instead of the sixgun carried by the typical Western character, although the cartridges in the gunbelt were dummy .45-70, chosen because they "looked tougher." As noted in the three-part DVD special feature on the background of the series, the generally negative image of the bounty hunter added to the antihero image infused with mystery and detachment that made this show stand out from the typical TV Western. The 94 episodes which ran from 1958 until early 1961 kept McQueen steadily employed, and he became a fixture at the Iverson Movie Ranch in Chatsworth, where much of the outdoor action for Wanted: Dead or Alive was shot.

At age 29, McQueen got a significant break when Frank Sinatra removed Sammy Davis Jr. from the film Never So Few after Davis supposedly made some mildly negative remarks about Sinatra in a radio interview, and Davis's role went to McQueen. Sinatra saw something special in McQueen and ensured that the young actor got plenty of closeups in a role that earned McQueen favorable reviews. McQueen's character, Bill Ringa, was never more comfortable than when driving at high speed—in this case, in a Jeep—or handling a switchblade or a tommy gun.

=== 1960s ===
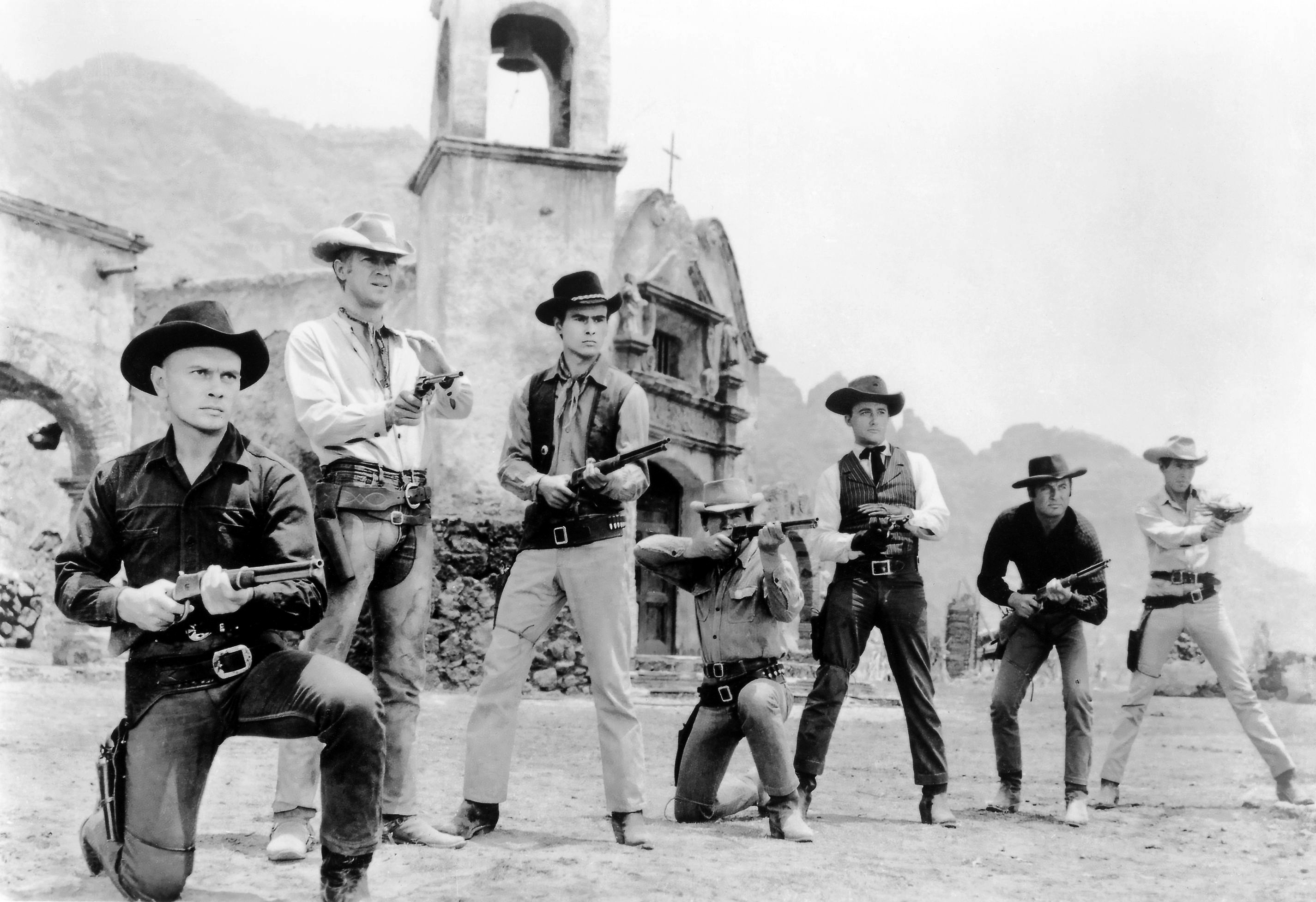
(L–R) Yul Brynner, McQueen, Horst Buchholz, Charles Bronson, Robert Vaughn, Brad Dexter, and James Coburn in The Magnificent Seven, 1960

After Never So Few, the film's director John Sturges cast McQueen in his next movie, promising to "give him the camera". The Magnificent Seven (1960), in which he played Vin Tanner and starred with Yul Brynner, Eli Wallach, Robert Vaughn, Charles Bronson, Horst Buchholz and James Coburn, became McQueen's first major hit and led to his withdrawal from Wanted: Dead or Alive. McQueen's focused portrayal of the taciturn second lead catapulted his career. His added touches in many of the shots, such as shaking his shotgun cartridges beside his ear before loading them, repeatedly checking his gun while in the background of a shot, and wiping his hat rim, annoyed top-billed Brynner, who protested that McQueen was stealing scenes.

In his autobiography, Eli Wallach reports struggling to conceal his amusement while watching the filming of the funeral procession scene in which Brynner's and McQueen's characters first meet. Brynner was furious at McQueen's shotgun round-twirl, which effectively diverted the viewer's attention to McQueen. Brynner refused to draw his gun in the same scene with McQueen, knowing that his character would probably be outdrawn.

McQueen played the top-billed lead role in the next big Sturges film, 1963's The Great Escape, Hollywood's fictional depiction of the true story of a historic mass escape from a World War II POW camp, Stalag Luft III. Insurance concerns prevented McQueen from performing the film's notable motorcycle leap, which was done by his friend and fellow cycle enthusiast Bud Ekins, who resembled McQueen from a distance. When Johnny Carson later tried to congratulate McQueen for the jump during a broadcast of The Tonight Show, McQueen said, "It wasn't me. That was Bud Ekins." This film established McQueen's box-office clout and secured his status as a superstar.

Also in 1963, McQueen starred in Love with the Proper Stranger with Natalie Wood. He later appeared as the titular Nevada Smith, a character from Harold Robbins' novel The Carpetbaggers, portrayed by Alan Ladd two years earlier in a movie version of that novel. Nevada Smith was an enormously successful Western action adventure prequel that also featured Karl Malden and Suzanne Pleshette. After starring in 1965's The Cincinnati Kid as a poker player, McQueen earned his only Academy Award nomination in 1966 for his role as an engine room sailor in The Sand Pebbles, in which he starred opposite Richard Crenna, Candice Bergen, and Richard Attenborough, with whom he had previously worked in The Great Escape.

After being nominated for an Oscar, McQueen was in Bullitt (1968) – one of his best-known films and his personal favorite – which co-starred Jacqueline Bisset, Robert Vaughn, and Don Gordon. It featured an unprecedented (and endlessly imitated) car chase through San Francisco. Although McQueen did the driving that appeared in closeups, his was about 10% of what is seen in the film's car chase. The rest of the driving by McQueen's character was done by stunt drivers Bud Ekins and Loren Janes. McQueen's character drove a 1968 Highland Green Ford Mustang GT 390 4-speed, while the Chicago mob hitmen's 1968 black Dodge Charger R/T 440 4-speed was driven by veteran stunt driver Bill Hickman. McQueen, his stunt drivers, and Hickman spent several days before the scene was shot practicing high-speed close-quarters driving. Bullitt was so far over budget that Warner Bros. canceled the contract on the rest of his films, seven in all.

When Bullitt became a major box-office success, Warner Bros. tried to woo McQueen back, but he refused, and his next film was made with an independent studio and released by United Artists. For the film, McQueen went for a change of image, playing a debonair role as a wealthy executive in The Thomas Crown Affair with Faye Dunaway in 1968. He signed a deal with Cinema Center Films to star in and produce films. In 1969, McQueen made the Southern period piece, The Reivers, based on a novel by William Faulkner.

=== 1970s ===
In 1971, McQueen starred in the auto-racing drama Le Mans, which received mixed reviews, followed by Junior Bonner in 1972, a story about an aging rodeo rider. He collaborated once again with director Sam Peckinpah in The Getaway, where he met his future wife Ali MacGraw. McQueen then took on a physically demanding role as a prisoner on Devil's Island in the 1973 film Papillon, alongside Dustin Hoffman as his character's tragic companion. By the time of The Getaway, McQueen was the world's highest-paid actor.

In 1974, with Paul Newman, McQueen co-led John Guillermin's disaster film, The Towering Inferno. McQueen played a fire chief assigned to stop a fire in a skyscraper. He was originally asked to play the architect who is the other hero of the story, but he requested to play the fire chief, thinking the part was "showier". The role of the architect went to Newman, a part that had more lines, hence McQueen requested more dialogue to even it out. McQueen was paid $1,000,000 plus a percentage of the gross, and he insisted on doing his own stunts. The film was a success, and its North American gross was $55,000,000.

After that, McQueen disappeared from the public eye to focus on motorcycle racing, traveling around the country in a motor home and on his vintage Indian motorcycles. He did not return to acting until 1978 with An Enemy of the People, playing against type as a bearded, bespectacled 19th-century doctor in this adaptation of the Henrik Ibsen play. The film was never properly released theatrically, but it has appeared occasionally on PBS.

McQueen's final two films, both released in 1980, were loosely based on true stories: Tom Horn, a Western adventure about a former Army scout turned professional gunman who works for big cattle ranchers hunting down rustlers, and later hanged for murder in the shooting death of a sheepherder; and The Hunter, an urban action movie about a modern-day bounty hunter.

=== Missed roles ===
McQueen was offered the lead male role in Breakfast at Tiffany's but was unable to accept due to his Wanted: Dead or Alive contract. He turned down parts in Ocean's 11, Butch Cassidy and the Sundance Kid (his attorneys and agents could not agree with Paul Newman's attorneys and agents on top billing), The Driver, Apocalypse Now, California Split, Dirty Harry, A Bridge Too Far, The French Connection (he did not want to do another cop film), Close Encounters of the Third Kind and Sorcerer.

According to director John Frankenheimer and actor James Garner in bonus interviews for the DVD of the film Grand Prix, McQueen was Frankenheimer's first choice for the lead role of American Formula One race car driver Pete Aron. Frankenheimer was unable to meet with McQueen to offer him the role, so he sent Edward Lewis, his business partner and the producer of Grand Prix. McQueen and Lewis instantly clashed, the meeting was a disaster, and the role went to Garner. Later, in an interview, Garner said:

Oh, McQueen. Crazy McQueen. McQueen and I got along pretty good. McQueen looked at me kind of like an older brother, and he didn't want to have much to do with me, till he got in trouble, then he'd call. He knew he could trust me to tell him just what I thought. A lot of people wouldn't do that... then we had... it wasn't a falling out... as I did Grand Prix, Steve was originally slated to do that movie, but he couldn't get along with Frankenheimer... that lasted about thirty minutes, and Steve was out, and I was in... Steve went over to do The Sand Pebbles, which went about a year longer than they wanted to go. Big production, spent a lot of money and stayed over in [Taiwan] too long... when I got the part in Grand Prix, I called him, in Taiwan. and I said, "Steve, I want to tell you, before you hear it from somebody else, that I'm going to do Grand Prix". Well, there was about a twenty dollar silence there, on the telephone. He didn't know what to say, and finally said "Oh, that's great, great, I'm glad to hear it." Because, he planned to do Le Mans, which was another title at the time, but we were going to be out, and Grand Prix released before he ever even got to that film. But he said, "Great, great, well, I'm glad to hear it; that's good. You know, if anybody's gonna do it, I'm glad, you're doin' it." He didn't talk to me for about a year and half, and we were next-door neighbors, so it did get to him a little bit. Finally, his son, Chad, made him take him to go see Grand Prix. And from that time on, we were talking again. But Steve was a wild kid. He didn't know where he wanted to be or what he wanted to do.

Director Steven Spielberg said McQueen was his first choice for the character of Roy Neary in Close Encounters of the Third Kind. According to Spielberg in a documentary on the film's DVD release, Spielberg met him at a bar, where McQueen drank beer after beer. Before leaving, McQueen told Spielberg that he could not accept the role because he was unable to cry on cue. Spielberg offered to take the crying scene out of the story, but McQueen demurred, saying that it was the best scene in the script. The role eventually went to Richard Dreyfuss.

William Friedkin wanted to cast McQueen as the lead in the action thriller film Sorcerer (1977). Sorcerer was to be filmed primarily on location in the Dominican Republic, but McQueen did not want to be separated from Ali MacGraw for the duration of the shoot. McQueen then asked Friedkin to let MacGraw act as a producer, so she could be present during principal photography. Friedkin would not agree to this condition and cast Roy Scheider instead of McQueen. Friedkin later remarked that not casting McQueen hurt the film's performance at the box office.

Spy novelist Jeremy Duns revealed that McQueen was considered for the lead role in a film adaptation of The Diamond Smugglers, written by James Bond creator Ian Fleming. McQueen would play John Blaize, a secret agent gone undercover to infiltrate a diamond-smuggling ring in South Africa. There were complications with the project, which was eventually shelved, although a 1964 screenplay does exist.

McQueen and Barbra Streisand were tentatively cast in The Gauntlet (1977), but the pair could not get along and both withdrew from the project—though according to one biographer, they had briefly dated in 1971. The lead roles were filled by Clint Eastwood and Sondra Locke. McQueen expressed interest in the Rambo character in First Blood when David Morrell's novel appeared in 1972, but the producers rejected him because of his age.

He was offered the title role in The Bodyguard (to star Diana Ross) when it was proposed in 1976, but the film did not reach production until years after McQueen's death; the film eventually starred Kevin Costner and Whitney Houston in 1992. Quigley Down Under was in development as early as 1974, with McQueen in consideration for the lead, but by the time production began in 1980, McQueen was ill. The project was scrapped until a decade later, when Tom Selleck starred.

== Stunts, motor racing and flying ==
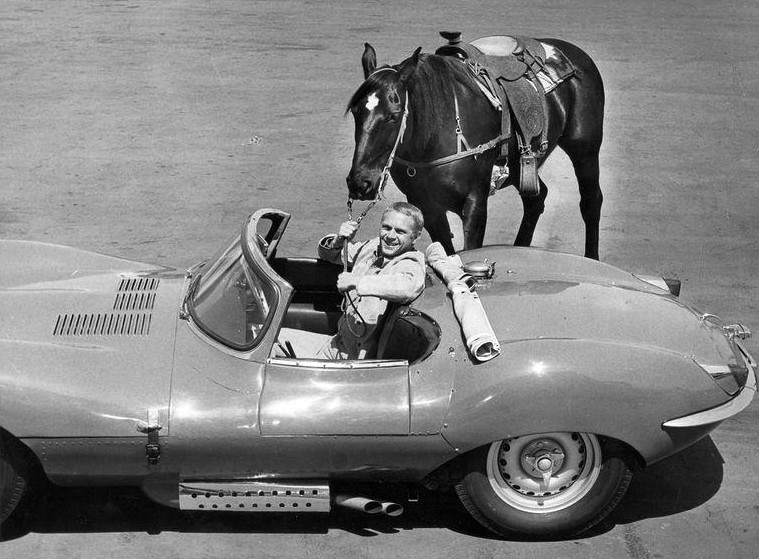
McQueen with two forms of transportation–his horse, Doc, and his Jaguar XKSS (1960)

McQueen was an avid motorcycle and race car enthusiast. When he had the opportunity to drive in a movie, he performed many of his own stunts, including some of the car chases in Bullitt and the motorcycle chase in The Great Escape. Although the jump over the fence in The Great Escape was done by Bud Ekins for insurance purposes, McQueen did have considerable screen time riding his 650 cc Triumph TR6 Trophy motorcycle. It was difficult to find riders as skilled as McQueen. At one point, using editing, McQueen is seen in a German uniform chasing himself on another bike. Around half of the driving in Bullitt was performed by Loren Janes.

McQueen and John Sturges planned to make Day of the Champion, a movie about Formula One racing, but McQueen was busy with the delayed The Sand Pebbles.

McQueen considered being a professional race car driver. He had a one-off outing in the British Touring Car Championship in 1961, driving a BMC Mini at Brands Hatch, finishing third. In the 1970 12 Hours of Sebring race, Peter Revson and McQueen (driving with a cast on his left foot from a motorcycle accident two weeks earlier) won with a Porsche 908/02 in the three-litre class and missed winning overall by 21.1 seconds to Mario Andretti/Ignazio Giunti/Nino Vaccarella in a five-litre Ferrari 512S.

This same Porsche 908 was entered by his production company Solar Productions as a camera car for Le Mans in the 1970 24 Hours of Le Mans later that year. McQueen wanted to drive a Porsche 917 with Jackie Stewart in that race, but the film backers threatened to pull their support if he did. Faced with the choice of driving for 24 hours in the race or driving for the entire summer making the film, McQueen opted for the film.

McQueen competed in off-road motorcycle racing, frequently running a BSA Hornet and using alias Harvey Mushman. He was also set to co-drive in a Triumph 2500 PI for the British Leyland team in the 1970 London-Mexico rally, but had to turn it down due to movie commitments. His first off-road motorcycle was a Triumph 500 cc, purchased from Ekins. McQueen raced in many top off-road races on the West Coast, including the Baja 1000, the Mint 400, and the Elsinore Grand Prix.

In 1964, McQueen and Ekins were part of a four-rider (plus one reserve) first-ever official U.S. team-entry into the Silver Vase category of the International Six Days Trial (ISDT), an Enduro-type off-road motorcycling event held that year in Erfurt, East Germany. The "A" team arrived in England in late August to collect their mix of 649 cc and 490 cc twins from the Triumph factory before modifying them for off-road use. Initially let down with transport arrangements by a long-established English motorcycle dealer, Triumph dealer H&L Motors stepped-in to provide a suitable vehicle. On arrival in Germany, the team, with their English temporary manager, were surprised to find that a Vase "B" team, comprising expat Americans living in Europe, had entered themselves privately to ride European-sourced machinery.

McQueen's ISDT competition number was 278, which was based on the trials starting order. Both teams crashed repeatedly. McQueen retired due to irreparable crash damage, and Ekins withdrew with a broken leg, both on day three. Only one member of the "B" team finished the six-day event. UK monthly magazine Motorcycle Sport commented: "Riding Triumph twins...[the team] rode everywhere with great dash, if not in admirable style, falling off frequently and obviously out for six days' of sport without too many worries about who was going to win (they knew it would not be them)".

McQueen was inducted into the Off-road Motorsports Hall of Fame in 1978. In 1971, McQueen's Solar Productions funded the classic motorcycle documentary On Any Sunday, in which McQueen is featured, along with racing legends Mert Lawwill and Malcolm Smith. The same year, he also appeared on the cover of Sports Illustrated magazine riding a Husqvarna dirt bike. McQueen designed a motorsports bucket seat, for which a patent was issued in 1971.

In a segment filmed for The Ed Sullivan Show, McQueen drove Sullivan around a desert area in a dune buggy at high speed. Afterward, Sullivan said, "That was a 'helluva' ride!" According to testimony by McQueen's son, Chad, Steve owned around 100 classic motorcycles, as well as around 100 exotic and vintage cars, including:

- Porsche 917, Porsche 908, and Ferrari 512 race cars from the Le Mans film
- Porsche 911S (used in the opening sequence of the Le Mans film)
- 1963 Ferrari 250 GT Berlinetta Lusso
- 1967 Ferrari 275GTB/4
- 1956 Jaguar XKSS (right-hand drive) (now on exhibit at the Petersen Automotive Museum in Los Angeles)
- 1958 Porsche 356 Speedster 1600 Super (black exterior, interior and top) (McQueen drove the car in numerous SCCA racing events) (now in property of his son Chad)
- 1968 Ford GT40 (Gulf liveried) (used in the Le Mans film)
- 1953 Siata 208s (McQueen replaced the Siata badges with Ferrari badges and called it his "little Ferrari")
- 1967 Mini Cooper-S (McQueen had the car customized by Lee Brown with changes including a single foglight, a wood dash, a recessed antenna and a custom brown paint job)
- 1951 Chevrolet Styline De Lux Convertible (used in The Hunter, McQueen bought the car in 1979 after filming ended)
- 1952 Chevrolet 3800 pickup camper conversion (McQueen used the truck for cross-country camping trips. It was the last car he rode in before his death)
- 1950 Hudson Commodore convertible
- 1952 Hudson Wasp 2-door sedan
- 1953 Hudson Hornet 4-door Sedan
- 1956 GMC Suburban
- 1958 GMC Pickup Truck (reportedly one of McQueen's favorite cars, it is powered by a 336 Ci V8 which has been modified. The tag "MQ3188" is a reference to the ID number assigned to him when he was in reform school)
- 1931 Lincoln-Zephyr Sedan
- 1963 Lincoln Continental Sedan
- 1935 Chrysler Airflow Imperial Sedan
- 1969 Chevrolet Baja Hickey race truck (originally debuted at the 1968 Mexican 1000 Rally and was driven by Cliff Coleman, Johnny Diaz, and Mickey Thompson and others during its racing career; said to be the first truck specifically constructed by General Motors for use in the Mexican 1000; McQueen bought it from General Motors in 1970)

In spite of numerous attempts, McQueen was never able to purchase the Ford Mustang GT 390 he drove in Bullitt, which featured a modified drivetrain that suited McQueen's driving style. One of the two Mustangs used in the film was badly damaged, judged beyond repair, and believed to have been scrapped until it surfaced in Mexico in 2017, while the other one, which McQueen attempted to purchase in 1977, is hidden from the public eye. At the 2018 North American International Auto Show the GT 390 was displayed, in its current non-restored condition, with the 2019 Ford Mustang "Bullitt".

McQueen also flew and owned, among other aircraft, a 1945 Stearman, tail number N3188, (his student number in reform school), a 1946 Piper J-3 Cub, and an award-winning 1931 Pitcairn PA-8 biplane, flown in the U.S. Mail Service by famed World War I flying ace Eddie Rickenbacker. They were hangared at Santa Paula Airport an hour northwest of Hollywood, where he lived his final days.

== Personal life ==
=== Relationships and friendships ===
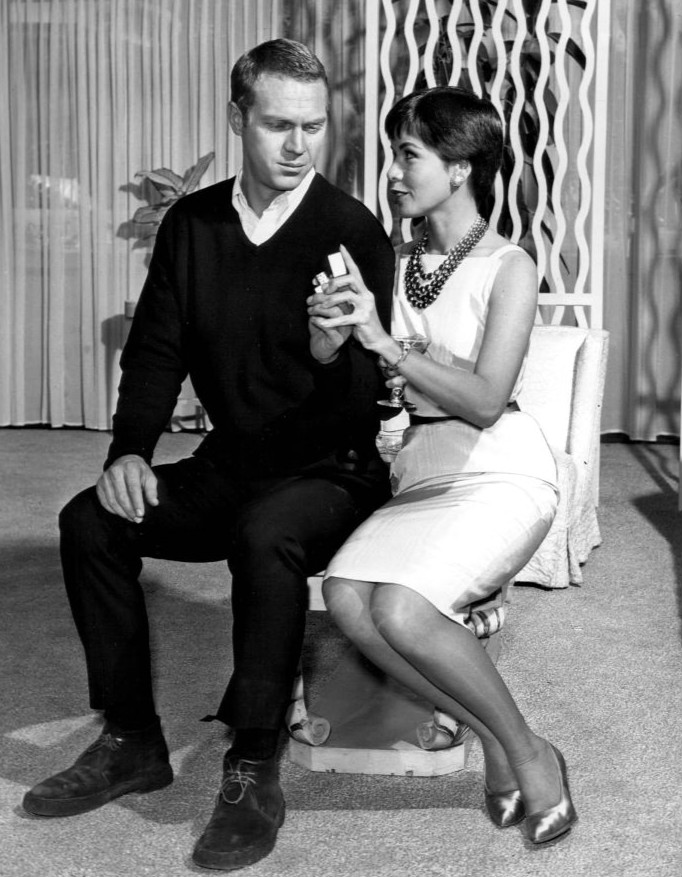
McQueen and then-wife Neile Adams in the "Man from the South" episode of Alfred Hitchcock Presents (1960), also starring Peter Lorre

McQueen dated British-American actress Gia Scala whilst attending Stella Adler's school in New York.

On November 2, 1956, McQueen married Filipina actress and dancer Neile Adams, with whom he had a daughter named Terry Leslie (June 5, 1959 – March 19, 1998) and a son named Chad (December 28, 1960 – September 11, 2024). Terry was the owner of a Malibu film production company. She died in 1998 of respiratory complications after a liver transplant, at the age of 38. Chad became an actor and race car driver like his father. McQueen and Adams divorced on March 14, 1972. In her autobiography, My Husband, My Friend, Adams said that she got an abortion in 1971 when their marriage was on the rocks.

Via his son Chad, one of McQueen's four grandchildren is Steven R. McQueen, who also became an actor. His granddaughter via his daughter Terry is actress and producer Molly McQueen. Mamie Van Doren claimed to have had an affair with McQueen and tried hallucinogens with him around 1959. Actress-model Lauren Hutton said that she also had an affair with McQueen around 1964. In 1971–1972, while separated from Adams, McQueen had a relationship with Junior Bonner co-star Barbara Leigh, ending in pregnancy and abortion.

McQueen married his The Getaway co-star Ali MacGraw in Cheyenne, Wyoming, on July 12, 1973, and they divorced on August 9, 1978. MacGraw suffered a miscarriage during their marriage. McQueen's closest friend in his last years, martial-arts master Pat Johnson, claimed that MacGraw was the one true love of McQueen's life: "He was madly in love with her until the day he died." In 1973, McQueen was one of the pallbearers at Bruce Lee's funeral, along with James Coburn, Lee's brother Robert, Peter Chin, Dan Inosanto, and Taky Kimura.

After discovering a mutual interest in racing, McQueen and The Great Escape co-star James Garner became good friends and lived near each other. McQueen recalled, "I could see that Jim was neat around his place. Flowers trimmed, no papers in the yard... grass always cut. So to piss him off, I'd start lobbing empty beer cans down the hill into his driveway. He'd have his drive all spick 'n' span when he left the house, then get home to find all these empty cans. Took him a long time to figure out it was me."

On January 16, 1980, less than 10 months before his death, McQueen married fashion model Barbara Minty. In her book Steve McQueen: The Last Mile, Barbara Minty wrote that McQueen, who was raised Catholic, became an evangelical Christian toward the end of his life. This was due in part to the influences of his flying instructor Sammy Mason, Mason's son Pete, and Barbara herself. McQueen attended his local church, Ventura Missionary Church, and was visited by evangelist Billy Graham shortly before his death.

=== Lifestyle ===
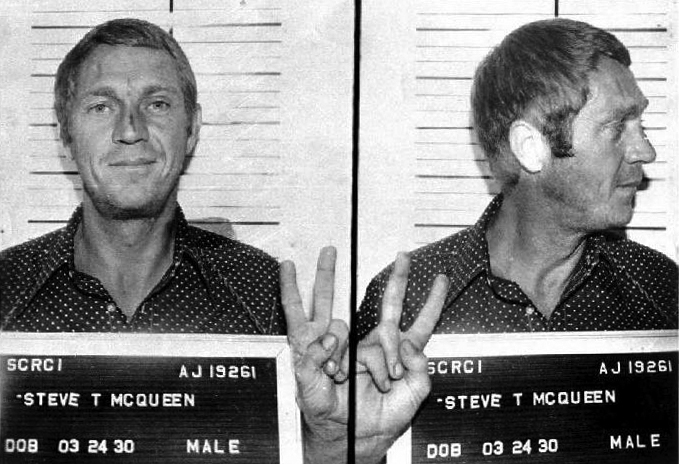
McQueen's mug shot booking photographs for DUI in Alaska, 1972

McQueen followed a daily two-hour exercise regimen involving weightlifting and, at one point, running 5 miles (8 km), seven days a week. McQueen learned the martial art Tang Soo Do from ninth-degree black belt Pat E. Johnson.

According to photographer William Claxton, McQueen smoked marijuana almost every day. Biographer Marc Eliot stated that McQueen used a large amount of cocaine in the early 1970s. He was also a heavy cigarette smoker. McQueen sometimes drank to excess; he was arrested for driving while intoxicated in Anchorage, Alaska, in 1972.

=== Manson connection ===
Two months after Charles Manson incited the Tate murders, including McQueen's friends Sharon Tate and Jay Sebring, the media reported police had found a hit list with McQueen's name on it. According to his first wife, McQueen began carrying a handgun at all times in public, including at Sebring's funeral.

=== Charitable causes ===
McQueen had an unusual reputation for demanding free items in bulk from studios when agreeing to do a film, such as electric razors, jeans and other items. It was later discovered that McQueen donated these things to the Boys Republic reformatory school, where he had spent time during his teen years.

=== Political views ===
Despite being registered as a Republican, McQueen supported Democratic candidate Lyndon B. Johnson in the 1964 presidential election, but reverted to supporting Republican candidate Richard Nixon in the 1968 presidential election.

== Illness and death ==
McQueen developed a persistent cough in early 1978. He gave up cigarettes and underwent antibiotic treatments without improvement. His shortness of breath grew more pronounced and on December 22, 1979, after filming The Hunter, a biopsy revealed pleural mesothelioma, a cancer associated with asbestos exposure for which there is no known cure.

A few months later, McQueen gave a medical interview in which he blamed his condition on asbestos exposure. McQueen believed that asbestos used in movie sound stage insulation and race-drivers' protective suits and helmets could have been involved, but he thought it more likely that his illness was a direct result of massive exposure while removing asbestos lagging insulation from pipes aboard a troop ship while he served in the Marines.

By February 1980, evidence of widespread metastasis was found. He tried to keep the condition a secret, but on March 11, 1980, the National Enquirer disclosed that he had "terminal cancer". In July 1980, McQueen traveled to Rosarito Beach, Mexico, for unconventional treatment after U.S. doctors told him they could do nothing to prolong his life. Controversy arose over the trip because McQueen sought treatment from William Donald Kelley, who was widely regarded as a quack and was promoting a variation of the Gerson therapy that used coffee enemas, frequent washing with shampoos, daily injections of fluid containing live cells from cattle and sheep, massages, and laetrile, a reputed anti-cancer drug available in Mexico but long known to be both toxic and ineffective in treating cancer.

McQueen paid for Kelley's treatments in cash, which were said to have been upwards of $40,000 per month, equivalent to $156,000 in 2025, during his three-month stay in Mexico. Kelley's only medically related license, until being revoked in 1976, had been for orthodontics, a field of dentistry. Kelley's methods caused a sensation in the traditional and tabloid press when it became known that McQueen was a patient.

McQueen returned to the U.S. in early October. Despite metastasis of the cancer throughout his body, Kelley publicly announced that McQueen would be completely cured and could return to normal life; however, his condition soon worsened, and huge tumors developed in his abdomen.

In late October 1980, McQueen flew to Ciudad Juárez in Mexico to have an abdominal tumor on his liver (weighing around 5 lbs/2.3 kg) removed, despite warnings from his U.S. doctors that the tumor was inoperable and his heart could not withstand the surgery. Under the name Samuel Sheppard, he checked into a small Juárez clinic, where the doctors and staff were unaware of his actual identity. On November 7, 1980, he died of a heart attack at 3:45 a.m. at a Juárez hospital, 12 hours after surgery to remove or reduce numerous metastatic tumors in his neck and abdomen. He was 50 years old. He reportedly died in his sleep with his family at his bedside.

Leonard DeWitt of the Ventura Missionary Church presided over McQueen's memorial service. McQueen was cremated and his ashes were scattered in the Pacific Ocean.

== Legacy ==
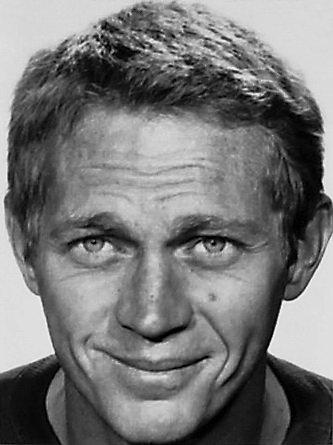
The photo on McQueen's international motorcycle driver's license given to him by FIM (the Federation Internationale Motocycliste), 1964

In 2007, 27 years after his death, Forbes said McQueen remained a popular star, was still the "King of Cool", and was one of the highest-earning dead celebrities. A rights-management agency head credited Branded Entertainment Network (called Corbis at the time) with maximizing the profitability of his estate by limiting the licensing of McQueen's image, thereby avoiding the commercial saturation of other dead celebrities' estates. By 2007, McQueen's estate entered the top 10 of highest-earning dead celebrities.

McQueen was inducted into the Hall of Great Western Performers in April 2007, in a ceremony at the National Cowboy & Western Heritage Museum. In November 1999, McQueen was inducted into the Motorcycle Hall of Fame. He was credited with contributions including financing the film On Any Sunday, supporting a team of off-road riders, and enhancing the public image of motorcycling overall.

The Beech Grove, Indiana Public Library formally dedicated the Steve McQueen Birthplace Collection on March 16, 2010, to commemorate the 80th anniversary of McQueen's birth on March 24, 1930. A street in San Antonio, Texas is named after McQueen. In 2012, McQueen was posthumously honored with the Warren Zevon Tribute Award by the Asbestos Disease Awareness Organization (ADAO).

Steve McQueen: The Man & Le Mans, a 2015 documentary, examines the actor's quest to create and star in the 1971 auto-racing film Le Mans. His son Chad McQueen and former wife Neile Adams are among those interviewed. On September 28, 2017, there was a selected showing in some theaters of his life story and spiritual quest, Steve McQueen – American Icon. There was an encore presentation on October 10, 2017. The film received mostly positive reviews. Kenneth R. Morefield of Christianity Today said it "offers a timeless reminder that even those among us living the most celebrated lives often long for the peace and sense of purpose that only God can provide". Michael Foust of Wordslingers called it "one of the most powerful and inspiring documentaries I've ever seen".

In the 2019 Quentin Tarantino film Once Upon a Time in Hollywood, McQueen is portrayed by Damian Lewis. McQueen also appears as a character in Tarantino's novel of the same name.

McQueen has been namechecked or referenced in songs or albums by artists such as Sheryl Crow ("Steve McQueen"), Prefab Sprout (album title), The Rolling Stones ("Star Star"), Brian Fallon ("Steve McQueen"), Drive-By Truckers ("Steve McQueen"), Queen ("Another One Bites the Dust") and Elton John ("Postcards From Richard Nixon").

=== Archive ===
The Academy Film Archive houses the Steve McQueen-Neile Adams Collection, which consists of personal prints and home movies. The archive has preserved several of McQueen's home movies.

=== Ford commercials ===
In 1998, director Paul Street created a commercial for the Ford Puma. Footage was shot in modern-day San Francisco, set to the theme music from Bullitt. Archive footage of McQueen was used to digitally superimpose him driving and exiting the car in settings reminiscent of the film. The Puma shares the same number plate of the classic fastback Mustang used in Bullitt, and as he parks in the garage next to the Mustang, he pauses and looks meaningfully at a motorcycle tucked in the corner, similar to that used in The Great Escape.

At the Detroit Auto Show in January 2018, Ford unveiled the new 2019 Mustang Bullitt. The company called on McQueen's granddaughter, actress Molly McQueen, to make the announcement. After a brief rundown of the tribute car's particulars, a short film was shown in which Molly was introduced to the actual Bullitt Mustang, a 1968 Mustang Fastback with a 390 cubic-inch engine and a four-speed manual gearbox. That car has been in possession of the same family since 1974 and hidden away from the public until then, when it was driven out from under the press stand and up the center aisle of Ford's booth to much fanfare.

=== Memorabilia ===
==== Motorcycles and cars ====
McQueen drove a Porsche 917 Chassis 022 extensively in Le Mans. After being sold and raced in the 1970s, Jerry Seinfeld acquired 022 in 2002, who asked Joe Cavaglieri to fully restore it to the 1971 film era in Gulf Porsche team livery. 022 was offered at auction on January 18, 2025, by Mecum Auctions but failed to sell because the $25 million final bid failed to meet the undisclosed reserve price. There is a dedicated webpage and video for 022, which features interviews with Seinfeld, Porsche Team members and grandson Chase McQueen. The 1970 Porsche 911S purchased while making the film Le Mans and appearing in the opening sequence was sold at auction in August 2011 for $1.375 million.

One of his motorcycles, a 1937 Crocker, sold for a world-record price of $276,500 at the same auction. McQueen's 1963 metallic-brown Ferrari 250 GT Lusso Berlinetta sold for US$2.31 million at auction on August 16, 2007. Except for three motorcycles sold with other memorabilia in 2006, most of McQueen's collection of 130 motorcycles was sold four years after his death.

From 1995 to 2011, McQueen's red 1957 fuel-injected Chevrolet convertible was displayed at the Petersen Automotive Museum in Los Angeles in a special Cars of Steve McQueen exhibit. It is now in the collection of actress Ruth Buzzi and her husband, Kent Perkins. McQueen's British racing green 1956 Jaguar XKSS is located in the Petersen Automotive Museum and is in drivable condition, having been driven by Jay Leno in an episode of Jay Leno's Garage. In August 2019, Mecum Auctions announced it would auction the Bullitt Mustang Hero Car at its Kissimmee auction, held January 2–12, 2020. The car sold without reserve for $3.4 million ($3.74 million after commissions and fees).

==== Watches ====
McQueen was a noted watch enthusiast, and became a sponsored ambassador for Heuer watches. In the 1971 film Le Mans, he famously wore a blue-faced Monaco Ref. 1133, which led to its cult status among watch collectors, purchasing six watches of the same model for the shooting of the film. On December 12, 2020, one of the last six models and one of two held in private hands was sold for a record US$2.208 million at a Phillips auction in New York City, becoming the most expensive Heuer watch sold at auction. Tag Heuer continues to promote its Monaco range with McQueen's image.

While the Rolex Explorer II, Reference 1655, is known as a Rolex Steve McQueen in the horology collectors' world, McQueen himself preferred the Rolex Submariner, Reference 5512, which he was often photographed wearing. The watch was sold for $234,000 at auction on June 11, 2009, a world-record price for the type.

In June 2018, Phillips announced McQueen's Rolex Submariner would hit the auction block in September that year. However, there was controversy whether the watch was his personal watch worn by McQueen himself or if the watch was bought, engraved, then gifted. Phillips later removed the watch from the auction block. Among McQueen's other watches was a Hanhart 417 chronograph.

==== Sunglasses ====
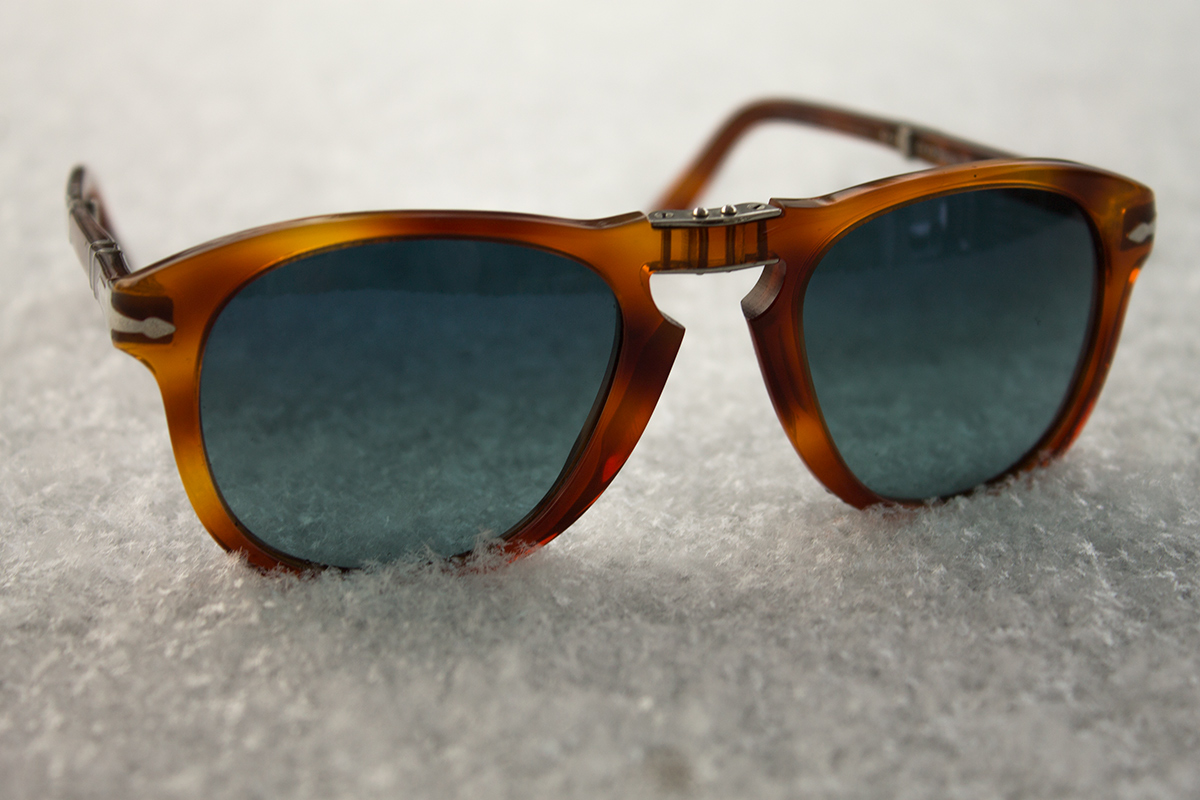
Persol Steve McQueen Edition sunglasses

In 2006, the blue-tinted sunglasses worn by McQueen in the 1968 film The Thomas Crown Affair sold at a Bonhams & Butterfield auction in Los Angeles for $70,200. The manufacturer sells a version of this design (Persol model 714) named after McQueen.

== Awards and honors ==
=== Academy Awards ===
- (1966) Nominated – Best Actor in a Leading Role in The Sand Pebbles

=== Golden Globe Awards ===
- (1964) Nominated – Best Actor – Motion Picture Drama in Love with the Proper Stranger
- (1967) Nominated – Best Actor – Motion Picture Drama in The Sand Pebbles
- (1967) Winner – Henrietta – World Film Favorite – Male
- (1970) Nominated – Best Actor – Motion Picture Musical or Comedy in The Reivers
- (1970) Winner – Henrietta – World Film Favorite – Male
- (1974) Nominated – Best Actor – Motion Picture Drama in Papillon

=== Laurel Awards ===
- (1960) Nominated – Golden Laurel – Top Male New Personality
- (1964) Nominated – Golden Laurel – Top Action Performance – The Great Escape
- (1964) Nominated – Golden Laurel – Top Male Star, 6th place
- (1966) Nominated – Golden Laurel – Male Star, 12th place
- (1967) Nominated – Golden Laurel – Male Dramatic Performance, 9th place – The Sand Pebbles
- (1967) Nominated – Golden Laurel – Male Star, 9th place
- (1968) Nominated – Golden Laurel – Male Dramatic Performance, 5th place – The Thomas Crown Affair
- (1968) Nominated – Golden Laurel – Male Star, 4th place
- (1970) Nominated – Golden Laurel – Action Performance – Bullitt
- (1970) Nominated – Golden Laurel – Male Star
- (1971) Nominated – Golden Laurel – Male Star, 5th place

=== Photoplay Awards ===
- (1968) Nominated – Gold Medal – Most Popular Male Star
- (1969) Winner – Gold Medal – Most Popular Male Star
- (1976) Nominated – Gold Medal – Favorite Male Star

=== Hollywood Walk of Fame ===
- (1986) Winner – Walk of Fame Star – Motion Pictures (posthumously honored)

=== Western Heritage Award ===
- (2007) Winner – Hall of Great Western Performers (posthumously honored)

=== Jules Verne Award ===
- (2010) Winner – Jules Verne Légendaire Award (posthumously honored)

=== Moscow International Film Festival ===
- (1963) – Won – Best Actor in The Great Escape

== Bibliography ==
- Niemi, Robert (October 17, 2013). Inspired by True Events: An Illustrated Guide to More Than 500 History-Based Films, 2nd Edition: An Illustrated Guide to More Than 500 History-Based Films. Santa Barbara, California: ABC-CLIO. ISBN 978-1-61069-198-7.
- Sanford, Christopher (February 19, 2003). McQueen: The Biography. Lanham, Maryland: Taylor Trade Publications. ISBN 978-0-87833-307-3.
- Wright, Kate (2004). Screenwriting is Storytelling: Creating an A-list Screenplay That Sells!. New York City: Perigee Books. ISBN 978-0-399-53024-1.
