= Andy's Play =

- The Office episode
- Episode no.: Season 7 Episode 3
- Directed by: John Stuart Scott
- Written by: Charlie Grandy
- Cinematography by: Matt Sohn
- Editing by: David Rogers
- Production code: 7003
- Original air date: October 7, 2010
- Running time: 22 minutes

Guest appearances
- Phil Abrams as Shelby Thomas Weems; Maxwell Glick as "Tobias Ragg"; Robert Mammana as Mitchel Walsh; Heather Marie Marsden as "Mrs. Lovett"; Kelly Ebsary as Torrie Sullivan; Algerita Wynn Lewis as Cynthia; Bobby Ray Shafer as Bob Vance

Episode chronology
← Previous "Counseling"	Next → "Sex Ed"
- The Office (American season 7)

"Andy's Play" is the third episode of the seventh season of the American comedy television series The Office, and the show's 129th episode overall. Written by Charlie Grandy and directed by John Stuart Scott, the episode aired on NBC in the United States on October 7, 2010. Guest stars include Robert Mammana, Phil Abrams and Robert R. Shafer.

The series—presented as if it were a real documentary—depicts the everyday lives of office employees in the Scranton, Pennsylvania, branch of the fictional Dunder Mifflin Paper Company. In the episode, Andy Bernard (Ed Helms) lands a role in a local production of Sweeney Todd and invites the entire office to the performance, hoping to impress his former girlfriend, Erin Hannon (Ellie Kemper). While Michael Scott (Steve Carell) struggles to put his jealousy aside, Jim Halpert (John Krasinski) and Pam Halpert (Jenna Fischer) have trouble with their less-than-stellar babysitter, Erin.

Originally, the producers and writers wanted the in-show musical to be performed badly, but they later changed their minds and decided that the musical should be quality work, according to Helms. The episode featured several guest actors and actresses to round out the parts in the musical. "Andy's Play" was viewed by 6.95 million viewers and received a 3.5 rating among adults between the age of 18 and 49, marking a slight drop in the ratings when compared to the previous week. Despite this, the episode was the highest-ranked NBC series of the night and received positive reviews from critics.

== Synopsis ==
Andy Bernard is going to perform as Anthony Hope in a local production of Sweeney Todd, and he wants his co-workers to come. He makes a special effort to invite Erin Hannon, whom he hopes to win back with a good performance. Michael Scott is especially hard to convince, since he is upset that he was not chosen to be in the musical after his own audition. Andy informs him that no one auditioning got the part of Sweeney Todd, which was instead given to a veteran "world class" actor, and Michael agrees to go. Jim and Pam Halpert want to go, but have been unable to find a babysitter for their daughter Cece. Erin agrees to come, but she later decides to babysit Cece so Pam and Jim can attend instead.

On the night of the show, Darryl Philbin reads from the program that contrary to Andy's assumption, the actor playing Sweeney Todd has no acting or singing experience, and was discovered by the director while singing karaoke, annoying Michael. During the intermission, the director compliments Michael on the "energy" of his audition and encourages him to audition again. Put out by this, Michael steals a bottle of wine from the concessions table, which he and his co-workers drink during the show. Andy, upset that Erin is not in the audience, repeatedly checks for messages from her on his cell phone. While he is on stage, his phone rings in his pocket, disrupting the musical and forcing the performers to improvise. To make matters worse, Michael drops his bottle of wine, causing a commotion as it rolls. He then loses grip of balloons he brought to his seat, which pop as they hit the top of the hall. This startles a baby, and her cries alert Jim and Pam to the fact that Erin came to the play with Cece, exciting Andy, but angering Jim and Pam. At the end of the show, everyone cheers except for Michael, who angrily boos the actor playing Sweeney Todd.

Angela Martin, having found a loophole in her parenting contract with Dwight Schrute which permits him to develop romantic feelings for her, attempts to attract him. She uses another technicality in the contract to force him to take her to Andy's play as a date, and wears uncharacteristically revealing clothing. But when Dwight becomes lustful, Angela rebuffs him and insists that they count the date as one of their five required instances of sexual intercourse. Meanwhile, Andy and Erin chat backstage, and Erin states how happy she is that they are spending time together outside of the Office again. However Gabe Lewis calls Erin, and she leaves to meet him. As Andy sulks backstage, his co-workers arrive and cheer him up.

== Production ==
There was a discussion of, like, 'Maybe [the musical] should be bad because it's a community theater … But then we started asking, why? 'Why aren't there good actors in Scranton, Pennsylvania? Why can't they be capable community theater actors?' … So we wound up going in that direction..

— Ed Helms, on the quality of the in-series musical.

"Andy's Play" was written by supervising producer Charlie Grandy, his fifth writing credit for the show. The episode was directed by John Stuart Scott, his first and only directing credit for the show. With the seventh season of The Office being Carell's last, the writers decided to divide the season into two distinct halves; the first half would "celebrate Carell's final year and highlight different actors on the show", whereas the second half would focus on his departure and the search for a new manager. As such, "Andy's Play" was one of the first episode of the season to specifically highlight "potential heirs to the throne", in this case Ed Helms' character, Andy.

According to Helms, the original script called for the musical numbers to be "slaughtered" by the actors and actresses. However, as the episode was being finalized, the producers decided for the cast to "perform razor-sharp renditions" of the songs instead. Due to the ensemble nature of the musical featured in the episode, guest actors and actresses were required. Actor Robert Mammana portrayed Mitchel Walsh, who played the title role in the play within the play. Heather Marie Marsden played Mrs. Lovett, Maxwell Glick appeared as Tobias, and Phil Abrams appeared as Shelby Thomas Weems, the musical's director.

The Season Seven DVD contains a number of deleted scenes from this episode. Notable cut scenes include Andy discussing the "crowd dynamic" at musicals and music events, Gabe discussing his history of playing Ichabod Crane in three separate play productions, Pam and Jim discussing how hard it is to get a babysitter, Michael ordering flowers, Andy getting a pep talk from his director, Phyllis worrying about Cynthia and Bob bonding, and Kevin talking to his sister who happens to be playing a part in the musical.

== Cultural references ==
The songs featured in the episode from the actual Sweeney Todd musical are "The Ballad of Sweeney Todd", "Johanna", and "By the Sea". Erin accidentally references The Baby-Sitters Club, a series of novels by Ann M. Martin, when talking about breaking into the babysitting business in Scranton. Michael brings balloons to the musical, Phyllis notes that they remind her of the 2009 Pixar film Up. Jim mentions that trying to put CeCe to sleep reminds him of the 2008 war film The Hurt Locker. The ending scene features Michael auditioning for the musical by re-acting an entire episode of the American police procedural and legal drama television series Law & Order, complete with opening monologue, theme music, and "Clang" sound effect, though the actual dialogue and storyline are not from any episode of Law & Order and were written specifically for "Andy's Play". Andy sings Macy Gray's single "I Try" with the rest of the office to cheer himself up at the end of the episode.

== Reception ==
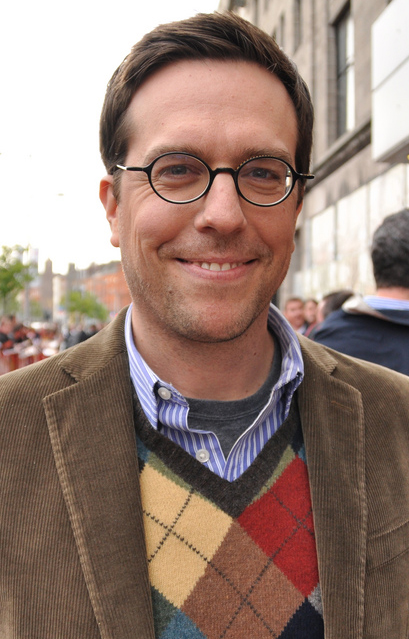
Many critics commented upon the scene wherein Ed Helms's (pictured) character Andy checks his cellphone on stage.

"Andy's Play" first aired on October 7, 2010. In its original American broadcast, it was viewed by an estimated 6.95 million viewers with a 3.5 rating/10 percent share among adults between the age of 18 and 49. This means that 3.5 percent of all 18- to 49-year-old households watched the episode, and ten percent of that demographic had their televisions tuned to the channel at any point. This marked a 0.2 rating decrease from the previous weeks episode, although the episode ranked second in its time slot and was the highest-rated NBC series of the night.

This episode received mostly positive reviews from critics. James Poniewozik of Time magazine wrote that, "'Andy's Play' was the kind of strong, character driven episode I've missed from the show—not just good by later season standards but an actual good Office episode, period." Dan Forcella of TV Fanatic wrote that the episode was a reminder of "what has always been great about this show". Alan Sepinwall of HitFix wrote that the episode "worked largely because it embraced [the] idea" that "the bonds you form at work go deeper than carpet, and that if you work with people long enough they can feel like your family." He ultimately concluded that the episode was one that "makes me happy [that] I spent an evening in the company of these goofballs."

Myles McNutt of The A.V. Club gave the episode a "B+", stating that it was "inconclusive" proof whether or not Andy could be the show's lead, in advance of Steve Carell's exit from the series, but that "in terms of providing entertainment, I think the episode worked quite well" and was "honest and charming". Vulture writer Phoebe Reilly was slightly critical of Apple product placements—Ryan's iPad and Andy's iPhone—but found the use of the second "still funny: the signature chirp of Andy's iPhone interrupts a scene, prompting him to pretend it's a bird that he has to silence by saying, 'He's gone to sleep now. I've closed his beak.'"

Many reviews commented upon Andy's phone-interrupted onstage scene. Poniewozik praised "Andy’s flop-sweat attempt to improvise his way out of his cellphone's going off while running up against the limits of what his character knows about Sweeney", calling it "hilarious". Forcella was complimentary towards "the awkward moment when his phone didn't stop ringing and [Andy] had to explain it on stage", noting that it had "brilliant timing and execution".
