= The Human Beinz =

American rock band

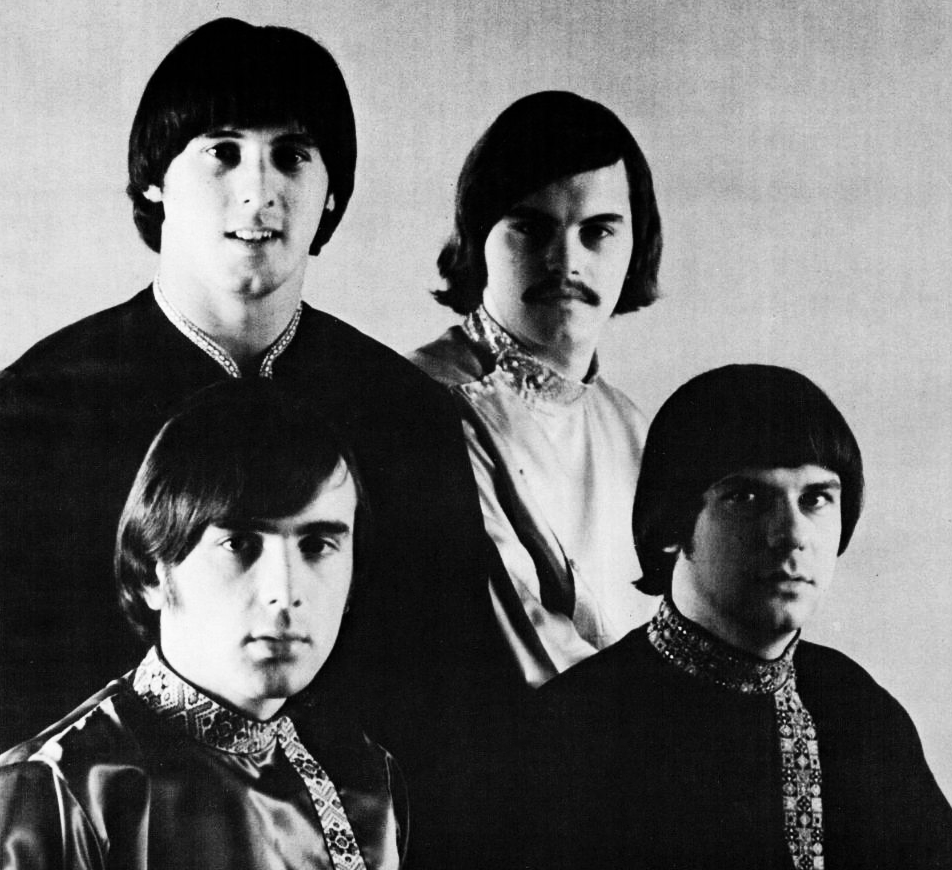
- The Human Beinz in 1968. Clockwise from upper left: Ting Markulin, Dick Belley, Mike Tatman, and Mel Pachuta

Background information
- Origin: Struthers, Ohio, United States
- Genres: Rock; rock and roll
- Years active: 1964–1969, 2007–present
- Label: Capitol
- Members: John "Dick" Belley; Joe "Ting" Markulin; Mel Pachuta; Gary Coates; Mike Tatman

The Human Beinz (/ˈbiːɪnz/ BEE-inz) is an American rock band from Youngstown, Ohio. Originally known as the Premiers, the band initially featured John Richard "Dick" Belley (vocals, guitar), Joe "Ting" Markulin (vocals, guitar), Mel Pachuta (vocals, bass), and Gary Coates (drums), later replaced by Mike Tatman.

Their only hit record in the US, "Nobody But Me", peaked in 1968 at number 8 on the Billboard Hot 100.

== Early career ==
The Beinz started in 1964 as the Premiers, launching their professional career to build a local fan base. In 1966, they changed their name to the Human Beingz because they felt their old name did not fit with the feel of the late 1960s. They recorded covers of songs by Them, the Yardbirds, the Who and Bob Dylan. The group was also the first to record a cover of "Gloria" by Them, which became a hit for the Shadows of Knight, and covered "The Pied Piper", which later became a hit for Crispian St. Peters.

The group signed to Capitol Records in 1967 and at that time Capitol misspelled their name, leaving out the "g". Capitol's purported idea was to affiliate the band's name with the Human Be-In movement of 1967.

The Beingz were told it would be changed on the next release if the debut single did not have any success. On 24 August 1967 "Nobody But Me" was released and became their only Billboard Top 40 hit, which meant that Capitol would not correct the spelling. "Nobody But Me" (written and first recorded by the Isley Brothers in 1962) peaked at No. 8 in February 1968. The recording's two 31-fold repetitions of the word "no" fulfill Casey Kasem's "Book of Records" category of most repetitive word or phrase in a Hot 100 top 10 hit, besting the 26-fold repetition of "I know" in Bill Withers' "Ain't No Sunshine". An album, Nobody But Me, followed.

The Beinz' next single, "Turn On Your Love Light", peaked No. 80 but became a huge hit in Japan, where it peaked at No. 1."Turn On Your Love Light", originally a hit for Bobby Bland in 1962, was later covered by Jerry Lee Lewis and the Grateful Dead. In 1968, Capitol released a second album, Evolutions. They also released the single, "Hold on Baby", exclusively in Japan, where it also hit the top of the charts. The band underwent a contractually obligated tour of Japan as a result of their success there and broke up immediately thereafter in March 1969.

== Revival ==
In 2003, the Human Beinz were among the bands featured in the Rock and Roll Hall of Fame exhibit Hang on Sloopy: The Music of Ohio. On display were a white Fender bass used by Mel Pachuta and a black Edwardian jacket worn by Ting Markulin.

In 2004, Quentin Tarantino used "Nobody But Me" in his film Kill Bill: Vol. 1, although it did not appear on the movie soundtrack. The same song was on two compilation albums: ESPN's The Greatest Crowd-Rockin' Anthems of All Time and J&R Music World Presents Rock and Roll's Greatest Hits of All Time. The song made yet another appearance in Martin Scorsese's 2006 film The Departed. It was also featured in the seventh-season premiere of the American comedy television series, The Office. In 2018, the song was used in Andrés Spinova's novel Marilyn y un Par de Ases, playing during a killer bees chase. Other uses of "Nobody But Me" are:

- Limitless (performer) – 1 episode – "Headquarters!" – 2015
- Glee (performer) – 1 episode – "Sweet Dreams" – 2013
- Recess: School's Out – 2001
- Malekat el leil (film) (Arabic-English translation: "Queen of the Night") – 1971
- It is featured in episode one of BBC One's This Is Going to Hurt.

The new lineup of the Human Beinz played the Hard Rock Cafe at Foxwoods Casino, Bodles Opera House, county fairs and other venues in the Northeast. The group featured their original leader Ting Markulin in 2007. The group wrote and recorded two songs, "McQ" (E. McCarthy, S. Crisafi) and "Coyotes & Rattlesnakes" (R. Iacovelli), for McQueen: An American Rebel (2007). The world premiere and gala were held at the Downing Film Center in Newburgh, New York. The Human Beinz with Markulin were in attendance, as were Barbara McQueen and author Marshall Terrill.

Joseph "Ting" Markulin lives in Florida. The Human Beinz worked on an album of originals and 1960s cover songs in Pennsylvania in May 2010. This effort was shelved and never released to the public. They appeared in concert at The Dome SUNY Binghamton Events Center in Binghamton, New York, in concert with Jay and The Americans and The Vogues, on May 8, 2010. On July 31, 2010, they appeared at Weekend of 100 Rock Stars, as part of the Nat Rock Con Fan Fest at the Sheraton Meadowlands in East Rutherford, New Jersey. Some of the group performed "Nobody but Me" live at a jam session show on July 31, 2010, at the Nat Rock Con Fan Fest with Danny and the Characters and Vince Martell of Vanilla Fudge.

Revival band members include Ting Markulin (rhythm guitar and vocals), Gene Szegedi (lead guitar), Sal Crisafi (keyboards, guitar and vocals), Ed McCarthy (bass), Rick White (lead vocals and percussion) and Mike Cerra (drums and percussion). The album, Garage Days Volume 1, was released on Fuel 2000 records in 2011.

== Members ==
- John Richard "Dick" Belley (born 1 August 1947) – vocals, guitar
- Joe "Ting" Markulin (born August 13, 1945) – vocals, guitar
- Mel Pachuta (born April 22, 1943 in Ohio) – vocals, bass
- Gary Coates – vocals, drums
- Mike Tatman (born 1 May 1947) – vocals, drums

== Discography ==
=== Albums ===
| Year | Title | US Top 200 |
|---|---|---|
| 1968 | Nobody but Me | 65 |
| 1968 | Evolutions | — |
| 1969 | In Japan | — |

=== Singles ===
| Year | Title | US Hot 100 | Canada Top 100 |
|---|---|---|---|
| 1967 | "Nobody but Me" | 8 | 4 |
| 1968 | "Turn on Your Love Light" | 80 | 80 |
| 1968 | "Every Time Woman" | — | — |
| 1968 | "Nobody But Me" | 67 | — |

== See also ==
- List of one-hit wonders in the United States
