= Nepotism (The Office) =

- The Office episode
- Episode no.: Season 7 Episode 1
- Directed by: Jeffrey Blitz
- Written by: Daniel Chun
- Cinematography by: Matt Sohn
- Editing by: David Rogers
- Production code: 7001
- Original air date: September 23, 2010
- Running time: 22 minutes

Guest appearances
- Kathy Bates as Jo Bennett; Hugh Dane as Hank Tate; Evan Peters as Luke Cooper

Episode chronology
← Previous "Whistleblower"	Next → "Counseling"
- The Office (American season 7)

"Nepotism" is the seventh season premiere of the American comedy television series The Office and the show's 127th episode overall. Written by Daniel Chun and directed by Jeffrey Blitz, the episode aired on NBC in the United States on September 23, 2010. The episode guest stars Kathy Bates as Jo Bennett, Evan Peters as Luke Cooper, and Hugh Dane as Hank.

The series depicts the everyday lives of office employees in the Scranton, Pennsylvania branch of the fictional Dunder Mifflin Paper Company. In the episode, the office turns against Michael Scott when he refuses to fire the new office assistant, Luke (Peters), who has a terrible attitude and happens to be Michael's nephew. Meanwhile, after accidentally ruining one of Jim Halpert's (John Krasinski) pranks, Pam Halpert (Jenna Fischer) tries to prank Dwight Schrute (Rainn Wilson) in return.

"Nepotism" received generally positive reviews from television critics; many commented on the episode's opening lip dub, although some noted the episode did not advance any story arcs. According to Nielsen ratings, the episode was watched by 8.4 million viewers, a slight increase from the sixth season premiere, "Gossip", and it finished second in its timeslot.

== Synopsis ==
The office returns from summer with a new office assistant, Luke. However, he goofs off, messes up food and coffee runs, and has a poor attitude that leads everyone to despise him. When Michael Scott steps up to defend him, it is revealed that Luke is Michael's nephew, whom Michael hired in hope that it will end the estrangement between him and his half-sister, Luke's mother. The office demands Michael get rid of Luke, but he refuses. Later on in the day, the office employees discover the trunk of Luke's car is filled with packages from the office that he neglected to send (along with Michael's rejected pants from Talbot's). Since Luke is now costing the office customers, Gabe Lewis informs CEO Jo Bennett of the situation. She tells Michael that if he will not fire Luke for his incompetence, he will be held responsible for anything he does. During a meeting, Luke acts out by annoying everyone with a laser pointer, so Michael spanks him in front of the entire office, leaving Luke to quit and run away crying and the rest of them satisfied. Gabe assigns Michael six hours of counseling with Toby Flenderson after his physical assault of a fellow employee; Michael is aghast at having to sit down with his archenemy, but under company policies the only alternative is termination.

Meanwhile, the rest of the office tells the camera crew what they have been doing over the summer. Erin Hannon started dating Gabe, and Andy Bernard tries to play it cool by using his anger management techniques. Kelly Kapoor attended a corporate training class as part of the "Print in All Colors" initiative for Sabre, and is trying to impress everyone by dressing up and "sounding smarter." Dwight Schrute bought the industrial park building, and Jim Halpert begins a lengthy prank to overload Dwight's key ring with fake keys. Seeing Jim adding on keys, Pam Halpert involuntarily laughs, alerting Dwight to Jim's prank. Though Jim tries to take it gracefully, Pam senses that he is mad at her for spoiling the prank, so she tries to make it up to him by devising a prank of her own. She enlists Kevin Malone to rewire the elevator so the buttons all do different things. To her dismay, Kevin's alterations to the elevator's 'circus board' result in Pam and Dwight getting trapped in the elevator together. Dwight pees on the floor, as he has been drinking from a hydration pack throughout the day. In the end the backfired prank does impress Jim.

== Production ==
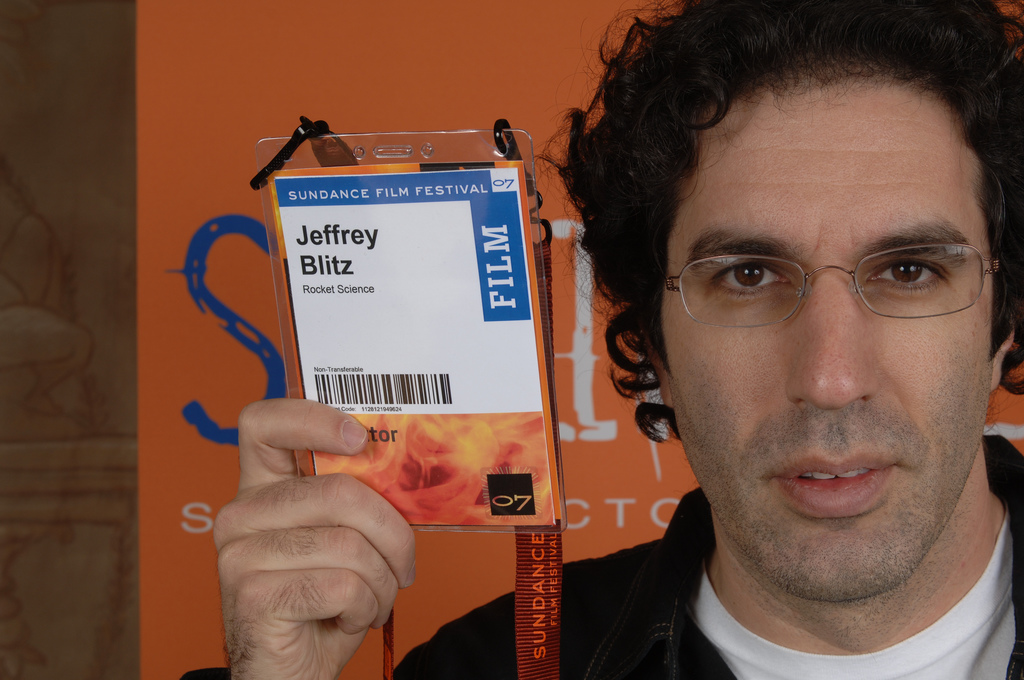
Jeffrey Blitz directed "Nepotism".

"Nepotism" was written by Daniel Chun and directed by Jeffrey Blitz, both of whom had worked on several previous episodes of The Office as writer and director, respectively. It was the seventh season premiere, and the first new episode to be broadcast since Steve Carell publicly announced he would depart from The Office by the end of the seventh season. At the time that "Nepotism" was filmed, the writers and producers had not yet determined who would replace Michael Scott as the office's manager, nor whether that character would be the primary protagonist of the show. "Nepotism" features Kathy Bates, Hugh Dane and Evan Peters in guest appearances as Jo Bennet, Hank Tate and Luke Cooper, respectively. It was also the first episode to feature Zach Woods as a regular cast member, although he had previously guest starred as Gabe Lewis in several sixth season episodes. "Nepotism" featured an updated opening credits sequence which more strongly highlighted the entire supporting cast, rather than just the main characters. Carell and Peters had previously appeared together in Sleepover (2004).

Through much of the development, the writers were unsure the nepotism storyline would work. Initially Luke was going to be Jo Bennett's grandson, but they later changed him to Michael's nephew, reasoning that it was more compelling for Michael to be caught between a work-related issue and a family-related issue, as compared to how the Jo relation had him caught between two work-related issues. Showrunner Paul Lieberstein said the moment when the entire story finally seemed to "click" was when he was in the editing room and received an index card from Aaron Shure with the story idea "Michael spanks Luke".

The laser pointer on Andy's eye was created with a CGI effect, since shining a laser into someone's eye can severely damage their vision. At the end of the episode, when Gabe prompts "Michael?", Michael was scripted to respond "I'm thinking.", but Steve Carell ad-libbed silence instead, trusting his facial expressions to convey what the script made explicit.

The official website for The Office included three cut scenes from "Nepotism" within a week of its original release. In the first clip, Toby reveals that he self-published his murder mystery novel and sold four copies, but is now being sued for plagiarism, while Kevin interviews that he resolved to become a liar. In the second clip, which is one minute and 17 seconds, Michael instructs Luke on how to use the photocopier. In the final clip, Dwight inquires about buying a robot. Additional cut scenes appeared on the DVD release, including scenes which explain why Pam enlisted Kevin to rewire the elevator's buttons: As part of his liar resolution, Kevin told her he once worked as an elevator repairman. Other significant cuts include Michael calling his half-sister, Marni Cooper, to discuss their becoming friends on Facebook and Luke's workplace misbehavior.

== Cultural references ==
During the cold open, the cast performs a lip dub to "Nobody but Me", performed by The Human Beinz, with the intention of placing the video on the Internet. This refers to an Internet meme trend that started with a 2009 YouTube video released by students of the Université du Québec à Montréal, in which hundreds of students lip-synched The Black Eyed Peas song "I Gotta Feeling" in one continuous take.

Michael claims that during his summer he caught the West Nile virus, an illness commonly transported by mosquito bite. He also claims to have watched Inception, a science fiction film that was critically and commercially successful in the summer of 2010. Michael says, however, that he may have only dreamed he watched it, a reference to the ambiguity surrounding the movie's ending. In one scene, Darryl explains he blew out his knee playing softball over the summer and watched a great deal of the cable news network CNN, which led him to develop grave concerns about the ongoing War in Afghanistan. Throughout the episode, Dwight wears a CamelBak, a hydration backpack from which the wearer drinks water through a hose. When Jim comments on the outrageous number of keys on Dwight's keyring, Dwight responds by saying, "The bigger the keychain, the more powerful the man", which Jim recognizes as a quote by the janitor from the show Scrubs. After pranking Dwight, Pam declares herself the "Bart Simpson of Scranton", a reference to the mischievous protagonist from the animated comedy series The Simpsons.

Luke declares himself a lover of cinema and says his favorite films are Citizen Kane, a classic 1941 film by Orson Welles, and The Boondock Saints, a 1999 crime thriller film. Creed indicates he follows Luke on the social-networking website Twitter specifically because Luke does not write about the actress Betty White, who was particularly popular at the time the episode aired. The same day "Nepotism" was broadcast, White appeared in the second-season premiere of Community, another comedy series on NBC. While trying to recall the last time he saw Luke, Michael remembers it was the release year of Ace Ventura: When Nature Calls (1995), a comedy film starring Jim Carrey. Michael has Luke pick up pants for him from Talbots, a retail store that specializes in women's clothing and accessories; this also serves as a callback to the Season 3 episode "The Negotiation", where Michael accidentally bought and then wore a women's pantsuit produced by a clothing brand called MISSterious. While reflecting on how difficult it is to work with family, he wonders aloud how the Ringling brothers have managed the Ringling Bros. and Barnum & Bailey Circus for so many years. He also claims that mixing family and business is a beautiful thing by illustrating what a bad idea it would have been to have open auditions for the band Hanson.

== Reception ==
"Nepotism" first aired on September 23, 2010. In its original American broadcast, it was viewed by an estimated 8.40 million viewers with a 4.4 rating/11% share in the 18–49 demographic coming second in its time slot and improving its rating by 1.80 million viewers from last season's finale.

"Nepotism" doesn't change the game or reinvent the wheel for the aging mockumentary, but rather offers a slightly more energetic variation on the usual formula. If anything, only the outside knowledge that the seventh season represents Steve Carell's final turn as career nincompoop Michael Scott affects the way we perceive this solid, if unremarkable entry into the series.

— Kevin Fitzpatrick, UGO Networks

The Atlantic writer Suzanne Merkelson praised the episode, and felt the opening lip-syncing scene highlighted the talents of the entire cast. However, she said the subplots were not as strong as the main story involving Michael, which underscored the challenge writers would have in maintaining The Office after Steve Carell's departure. The A.V. Club writer Myles McNutt, who was critical of the sixth season, said "Nepotism" was effective both in its main storyline involving Michael and Luke, and its B story involving Pam pulling a prank on Dwight. Although slightly disappointed that the episode did not allude to Michael's eventual replacement, McNutt said "Nepotism" demonstrated The Office would continue to be the same show even without Carell. Aishini Thiyagarajan of The Cornell Daily Sun highly praised the episode, claiming it highlighted the best traits of all the characters. She especially praised the cold open and the ending scene with Michael spanking Luke. Phoebe Reilly of New York magazine said the episode lacked any poor points, and said it established the season as one of "a mix of high jinks and heart". Rick Porter of Zap2it described "Nepotism" as "an old-school episode" with a strong main story and subplot, and praised Kelly's new attitude following her executive training. His only criticism was that Dwight seemed too over-the-top, particularly while wielding a knife during the cold open lip dub.

Kevin Fitzpatrick of UGO Networks said that this was a good episode, but not an especially important one which failed to advance any ongoing story lines. Although he called scenes like Michael spanking Luke and his defense of Luke during the meeting as "classic Scott", Fitzpatrick also said the episode does little to start establishing a proper send-off for the character's final season. Time magazine television critic James Poniewozik called it "a fine but unremarkable, meat-and-potatoes Office about a Michael screw-up", which made him question whether the show could continue after Carell left. Although he complimented individual moments, Poniewozik called the cold open a "self-congratulatory, awkward [and] unearned curtain call". Joel Keller of TV Squad praised the cold open, but felt the rest of the episode was extremely disappointing. Keller said few of the characters' stories about how they spent their summers stood out, and said Michael's spanking of Luke was awkward and unfunny. Brooklynne Kelly Peters of Blast magazine said the episode started strong with the lip synching cold open, but that the rest of the episode was not as funny as the series often is, describing it as "mundane hilarity".
