= Nobody but You =

Nobody but You may refer to:

== Music ==
=== Albums ===
- Nobody but You, 1966 album by Camille Bob
- Nobody but You, 1976 album by Jackie Wilson
- Nobody but You, 1979 album by Charlie Rich
- Nobody but You, 1988 album by John P. Hammond
- Nobody but You, 1996 album by Slim & the Supreme Angels

=== Songs ===
- "Nobody but You" (Dee Clark song), 1958
- "Nobody but You" (Don Williams song), 1983
- "Nobody but You" (Cesár Sampson song), 2018
- "Nobody but You" (Blake Shelton song), 2019
- "Nobody but You", 1919 song by Arthur J. Jackson and Buddy DeSylva from the musical La La Lucille
- "Nobody but You", 1929 song by Cliff Edwards from the film The Hollywood Revue of 1929
- "Nobody but You", 1957 song by Little Walter
- "Nobody but You", 1958 song by Mamie Van Doren
- "Nobody but You", 1962 song by Etta James from Etta James, written by Willie Dixon
- "Nobody but You", 1962 song by Marty Balin
- "Nobody but You", 1965 song by Golden Earrings from Just Ear-rings
- "Nobody but You", 1965 song by Neil Sedaka from Neil Sedaka: The '50s and '60s
- "Nobody but You", 1965 song by The Temptations from The Temptin' Temptations
- "Nobody but You", 1965 song by The Tokens
- "Nobody but You", 1966 song by Camille Bob
- "Nobody but You", 1969 song by Perry Como from Seattle
- "Nobody but You", 1969 song by The Buckaroos
- "Nobody but You", 1971 song by Loggins and Messina from Sittin' In
- "Nobody but You", 1972 song by James Taylor from One Man Dog
- "Nobody but You", 1976 song by Gladys Knight & the Pips
- "Nobody but You", 1976 song by Jackie Wilson
- "Nobody but You", 1982 song by J. J. Cale from Grasshopper
- "Nobody but You", 1983 song by Curtis Mayfield from Honesty
- "Nobody but You", 1985 song by Juicy
- "Nobody but You", 1990 song by Lou Reed and John Cale from Songs for Drella
- "Nobody but You", 1992 song by James Blood Ulmer from Blues Preacher
- "Nobody but You", 1993 song by The Hooters from Out of Body
- "Nobody but You", 1994 song by Elkie Brooks from Nothin' but the Blues, co-written by Willie Dixon and Bessie Smith
- "Nobody but You", 1994 song by Robert Palmer from Honey
- "Nobody but You", 1996 song by Backstreet Boys from Backstreet Boys
- "Nobody but You", 1994 song by Michael Feinstein from Michael & George: Feinstein Sings Gershwin, written by Arthur J. Jackson and Buddy DeSylva from the musical La La Lucille
- "Nobody but You", 2002 song by BoA from Listen to My Heart
- "Nobody but You", 2003 song by Little Brother from The Listening
- "Nobody but You", 2005 song by Al Green from Everything's OK
- "Nobody but You", 2005 song by Girls Aloud, B-side to the single "Biology"
- "Nobody but You", 2006 song by Crystal Kay from Call Me Miss...
- "Nobody but You", 2006 song by The Black Keys from the EP Chulahoma: The Songs of Junior Kimbrough, written by Junior Kimbrough
- "Nobody but You", 2008 song by Cassie
- "Nobody but You", 2010 song by The Apples in Stereo from Travellers in Space and Time
- "Nobody but You", 2012 song by Serena Ryder from Harmony
- "Nobody but You", 2013 song by Algebra
- "Nobody but You", 2013 song by Wizkid
- "Nobody but You", 2014 song by Kimbra from The Golden Echo
- "Nobody but You", 2014 song by Mary J. Blige from The London Sessions
- "Nobody but You", 2015 song by Bastarz from the EP Conduct Zero
- "Nobody but You", 2015 song by Gloriana from Three
- "Nobody but You", 2016 song by Charles Bradley from Changes

== Other uses ==
- Nobody but You, 2009 novel by Francis Ray in the Grayson Friends series

== See also ==
- "Nobody" (Wonder Girls song), a song by Wonder Girls with the catchphrase
- Tú o nadie (English: You or no one / No one but you), a 1985 Mexican telenovela
- "I Don't Want to Be with Nobody but You", 1990 song by Australian group Absent Friends
- Nobody but Me (disambiguation)
