= Ferrari 250 GT Lusso =

Ferrari 250 GT Berlinetta Lusso
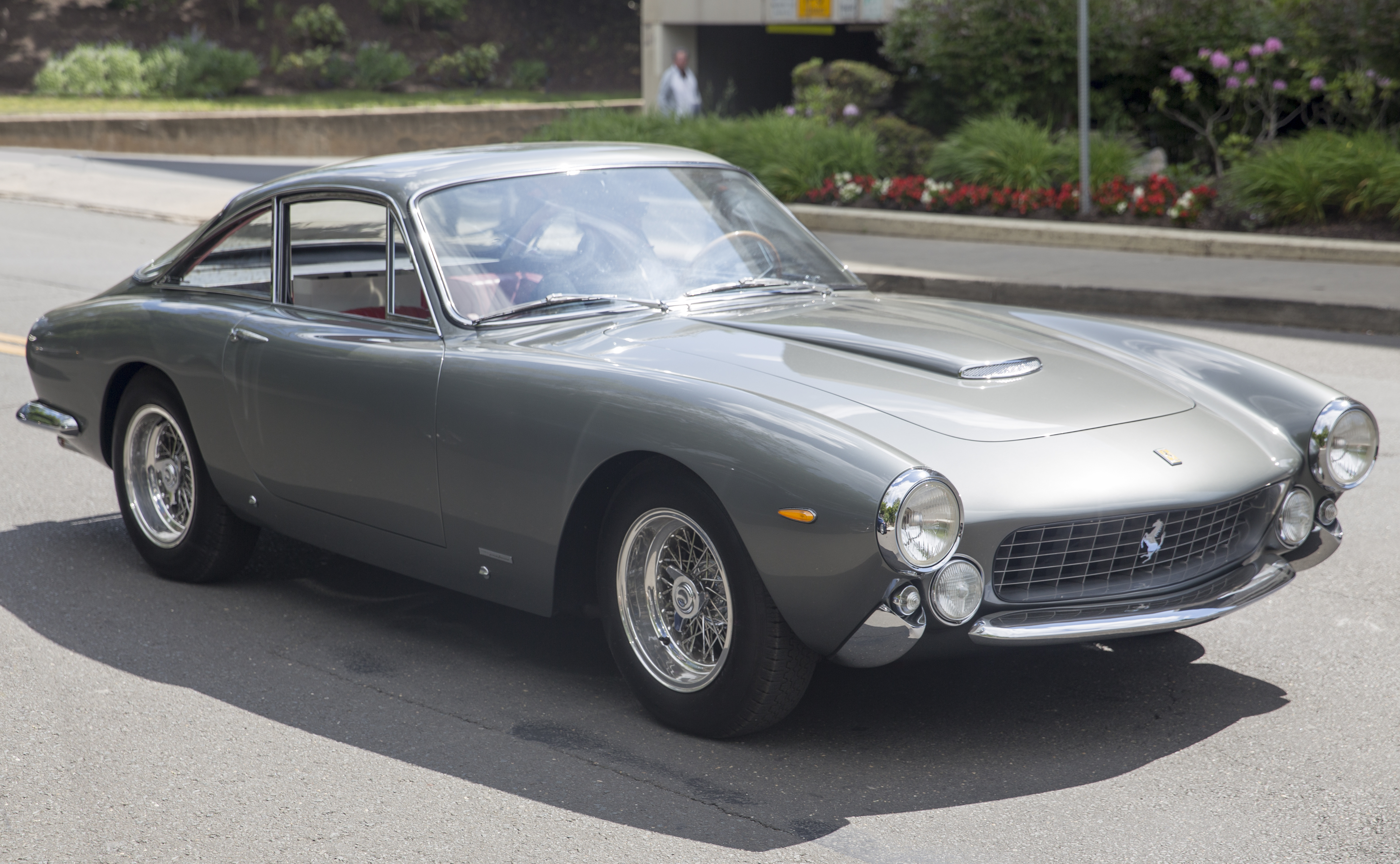
- Ferrari 250 GT Lusso

Overview
- Manufacturer: Ferrari
- Also called: GTL, GT/L
- Production: 1962–1964 (351 produced)
- Assembly: Italy: Modena (Carrozzeria Scaglietti)
- Designer: Pininfarina

Body and chassis
- Class: Grand tourer
- Body style: Coupé
- Layout: FR layout

Powertrain
- Engine: 3.0 L (2953.21 cc) Tipo 168U Colombo V12
- Transmission: 4 and 5-speed manual

Dimensions
- Wheelbase: 2,400 mm (94.5 in)
- Length: 4,410 mm (173.6 in)
- Width: 1,750 mm (68.9 in)
- Height: 1,290 mm (50.8 in)
- Curb weight: 1,020–1,310 kg (2,250–2,890 lb)

Chronology
- Predecessor: Ferrari 250 GT Coupé
- Successor: Ferrari 275 GTB

The Ferrari 250 GT Berlinetta Lusso is a GT car which was manufactured by Italian automaker Ferrari from 1962 to 1964. Sometimes known as the GTL, GT/L or just Lusso, it is larger and more luxurious (Note: Lusso means "luxury" in Italian.) than the 250 GT Berlinetta. The 250 GT Lusso, which was not intended to compete in sports car racing, is considered to be one of the most elegant Ferraris.

== Development ==
Keeping in line with the Ferrari "tradition" of that time, the 250 GT Lusso was designed by the Turinese coachbuilder Pininfarina, and bodied by Carrozzeria Scaglietti. Although the interior was more spacious than that of the 250 GT, the 250 GT Lusso remained a two-seat GT coupe, unlike the 250 GTE. The car was manufactured for only eighteen months, from 1962 to mid 1964, and was the last model of Ferrari 250 GT generation.

Auto shows often provide an opportunity for manufacturers to introduce new designs publicly. Ferrari did so at the 1962 Paris Motor Show to unveil, as a prototype, the 250 GT Lusso. The prototype was almost identical to the production version, and only minor details changed thereafter.

The new model was a way for Ferrari to fill a void left between the sporty 250 GT SWB and the luxurious 250 GTE 2+2, (Note: The 1950s were marked by the rapid evolution of road infrastructure, inducing increased demand for the faster and more balanced automobiles known as Grand Touring. Seating just two in the front and two in the rear, thus 2+2.) the Lusso met the new demands of the 1960s. Indeed, fans of sporting driving of the time became as fond of civilized designs, that is, comfortable and spacious, as they were of radical sports cars. Ferrari did not skimp on details in the GTL, which shows on the scales; weight ranged from 1,020 to 1,310 kg (2,250 to 2,890 lb), depending on equipment.

Unusually brief for a Ferrari model, GTL's production began in 1962 and ended August 1964. According to a longstanding American expert on Ferrari, Peter Coltrin, the construction of the 250 GT Lusso must have begun soon after the presentation of the prototype of the Paris Motor Show.

Although it was not intended to compete, the 250 GT Lusso made a few appearances in several sporting events in 1964 and 1965, such as the Targa Florio and the Tour de France. The final iteration of the 250 GT series, 351 examples of GT Lusso were produced before being replaced by the Ferrari 275 GTB. (Note nomenclature change due to increase in engine cylinder capacity.) Originally sold for $13,375, the 250 GT Lusso saw sales in 2021-2022 between $1.2 million to $2.1 million.

=== External appearance ===
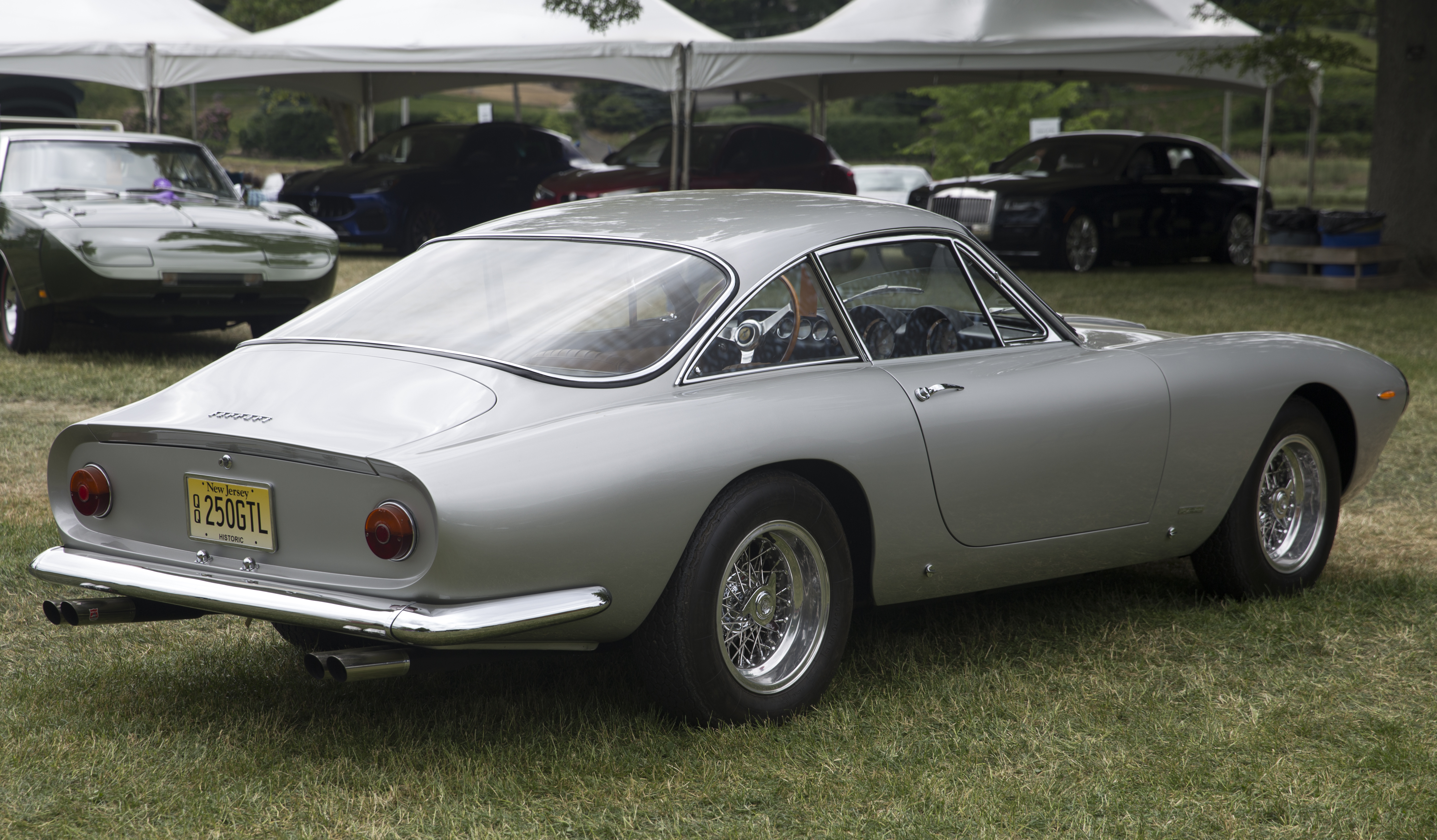
1963 Ferrari 250 GT Lusso in Grigio Argento

Using certain aesthetic and aerodynamic features of the 250 GT and 250 GTO, Pininfarina led the design of the 250 GT Lusso, (Note: The 250 GT Lusso is also the first Ferrari model to have a crest on its Pininfarina body, usually maintained thereafter by the Turin designer.) regarded by many as one of the most beautiful Ferraris ever made; it attracted notable personalities of that time, such as Steve McQueen and Eric Clapton.

As usual, the company Carrozzeria Scaglietti was responsible for the manufacturing of the body. The body was made of steel with the exception of the doors, boot lid, and bonnet, which were made of aluminium. The stern of the body featured a small integrated spoiler; the 250 GTL became the first Ferrari to incorporate such aerodynamic appendages, concluding with an abrupt Kammback rear.

The short rear is also characterized by a bezel that slopes down to the "tail" of the car. The glazed surfaces, including the rear window and triangular quarter windows, provided good visibility. The 250 GTL came with four round headlights in the front with the exception of a few versions, like an early London show car s/n 4335GT, that was used by Battista Pininfarina himself, featuring two covered headlights and an elongated nose section, like on previous style Ferraris. Numerous details of the body are unique to the 250 GT Lusso, such as the rectangular air vent placed on the hood, curved wings, and chrome bumpers, which were mainly decorative and positioned vertically beneath the indicator lights.

=== Interior ===
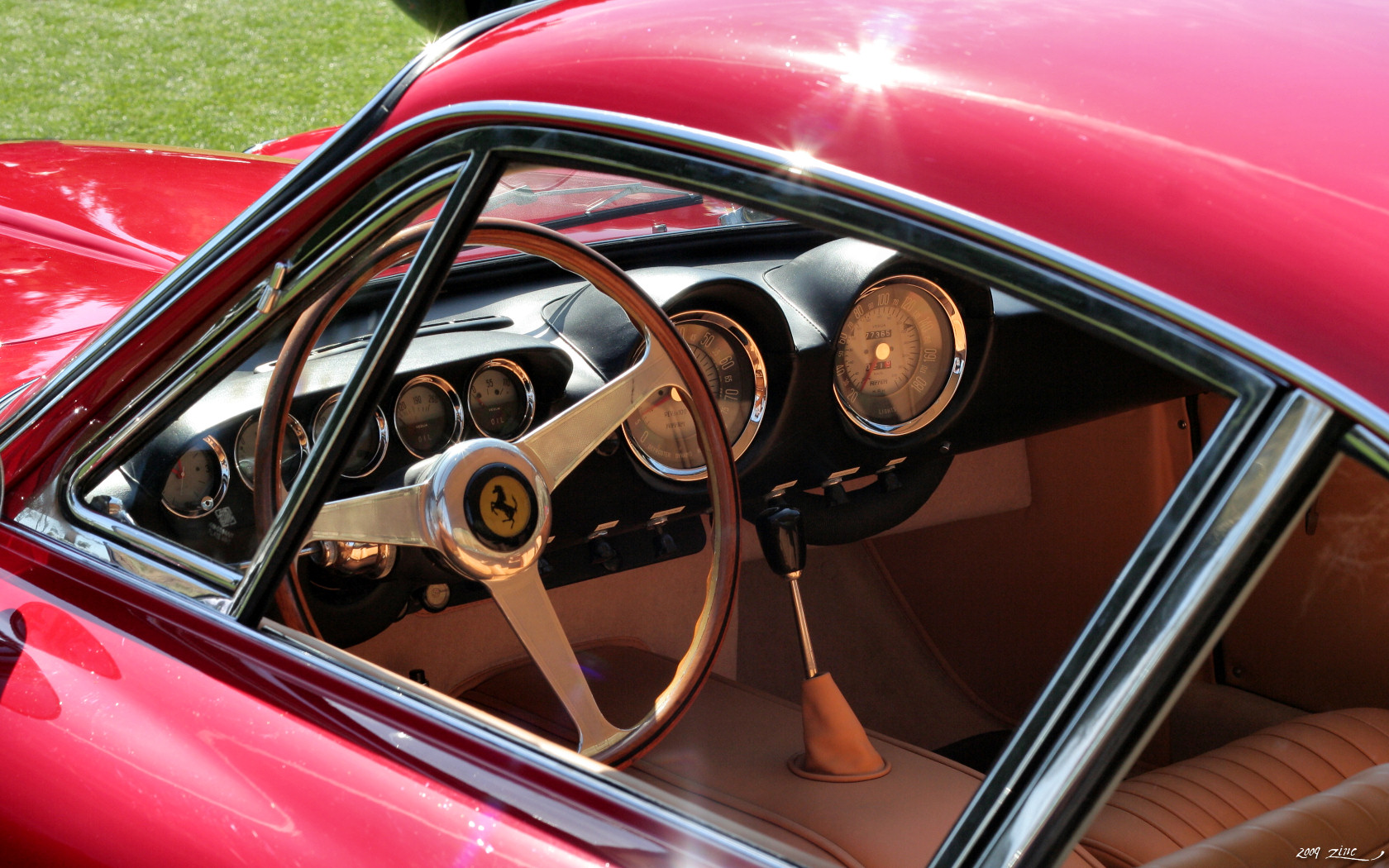
The instrument panel of the 250 GT

As a variation of the luxurious 250 GT, the 250 GT Lusso has a spacious interior, made possible by the forward position of the engine; this was an unusual design choice at the time for Ferrari, known for their sports cars which emphasized even front/rear weight distribution. As the car was only a two-seater, there was a fairly capacious boot space with a parcel shelf, covered in quilted leather.

While the 250 GT Lusso was a civilized sports car, it was nevertheless "recommended in preference to young and flexible passengers" due to the fixed-position seatbacks. Despite this, the pedals were adjustable to 5 cm (2.0 inches), as in the racing versions. The design of the instrument panel, covered with soft and black leather, was unusual; the tachometer, with a red zone beginning at 8,000 rpm, and the speedometer were placed at the center slightly tilted towards the driver. Five additional gauges were positioned in front of the driver, behind the three-spoke Nardi steering wheel made of wood and aluminium, placed almost vertically.

== Specifications ==
=== Chassis, brakes and suspensions ===
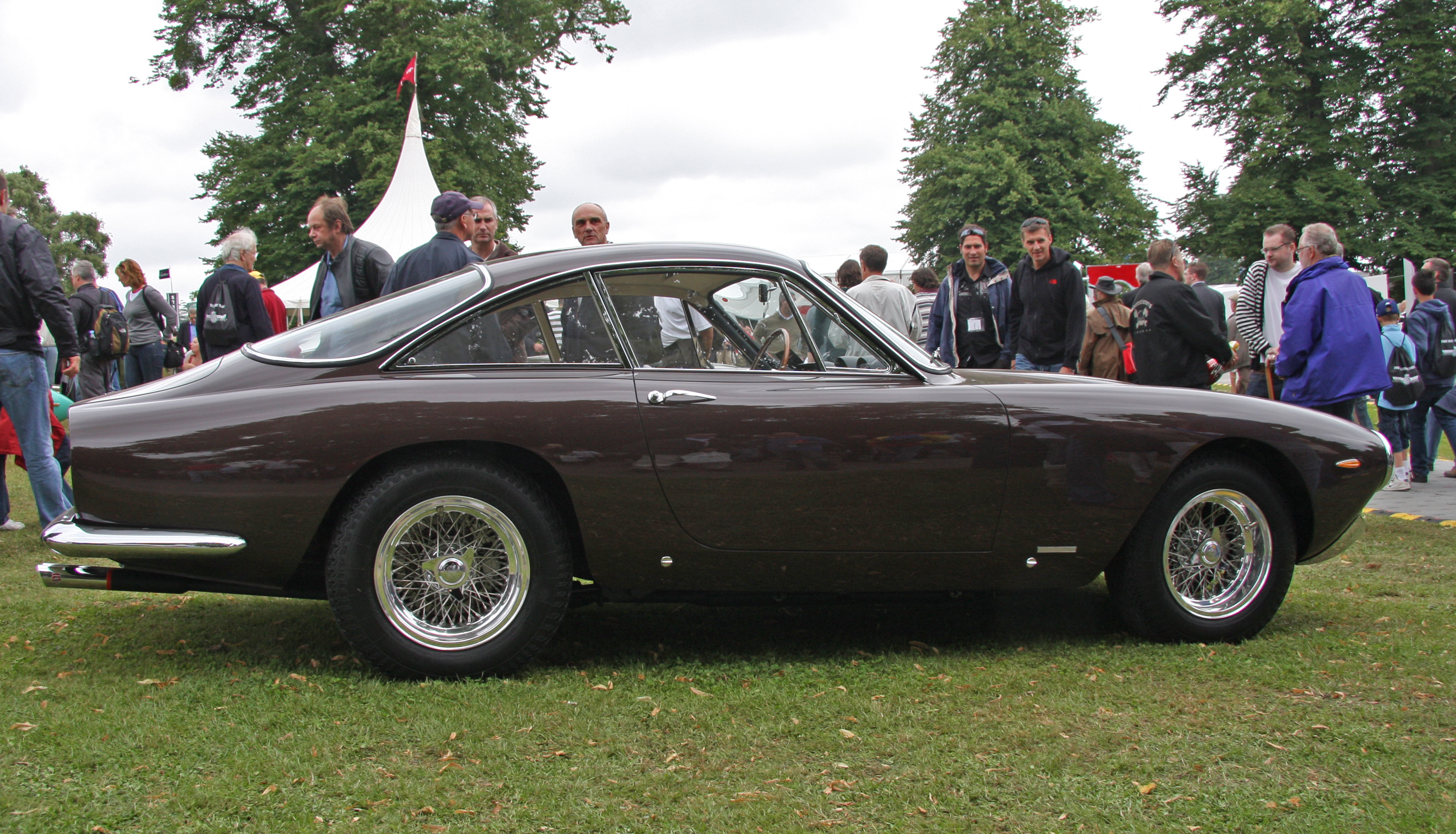
The 250 GT Lusso has a short wheelbase of 2.40 m (94 in).

Contrary to the 250 GTE "2+2" which had a wheelbase of 2.6 m (100 inches), the GT Lusso was built on a short wheelbase of 2.4 m (94 inches), identical to that of the 250 GT Berlinetta. The chassis was adopted from the tubular structure of the 250 GTO, but with narrower tubes. The chassis could, according to Brian Laban, author of Ferrarissime, "brilliantly support the comparison with that of competitors".

At the level of suspensions, the 250 GT Lusso had double wishbones and coil springs at the front, while the rear suspension comprised a live axle, leaf springs, semi-elliptical concentric coil springs and telescopic shock absorbers. Braking was provided by four-wheel disc brakes with hydraulic control, placed behind the polished aluminium Borrani wire wheels with knock-off hubs, fitted with 185VR15 Pirelli Cinturato CA67 tyres.

=== Engine and transmission ===
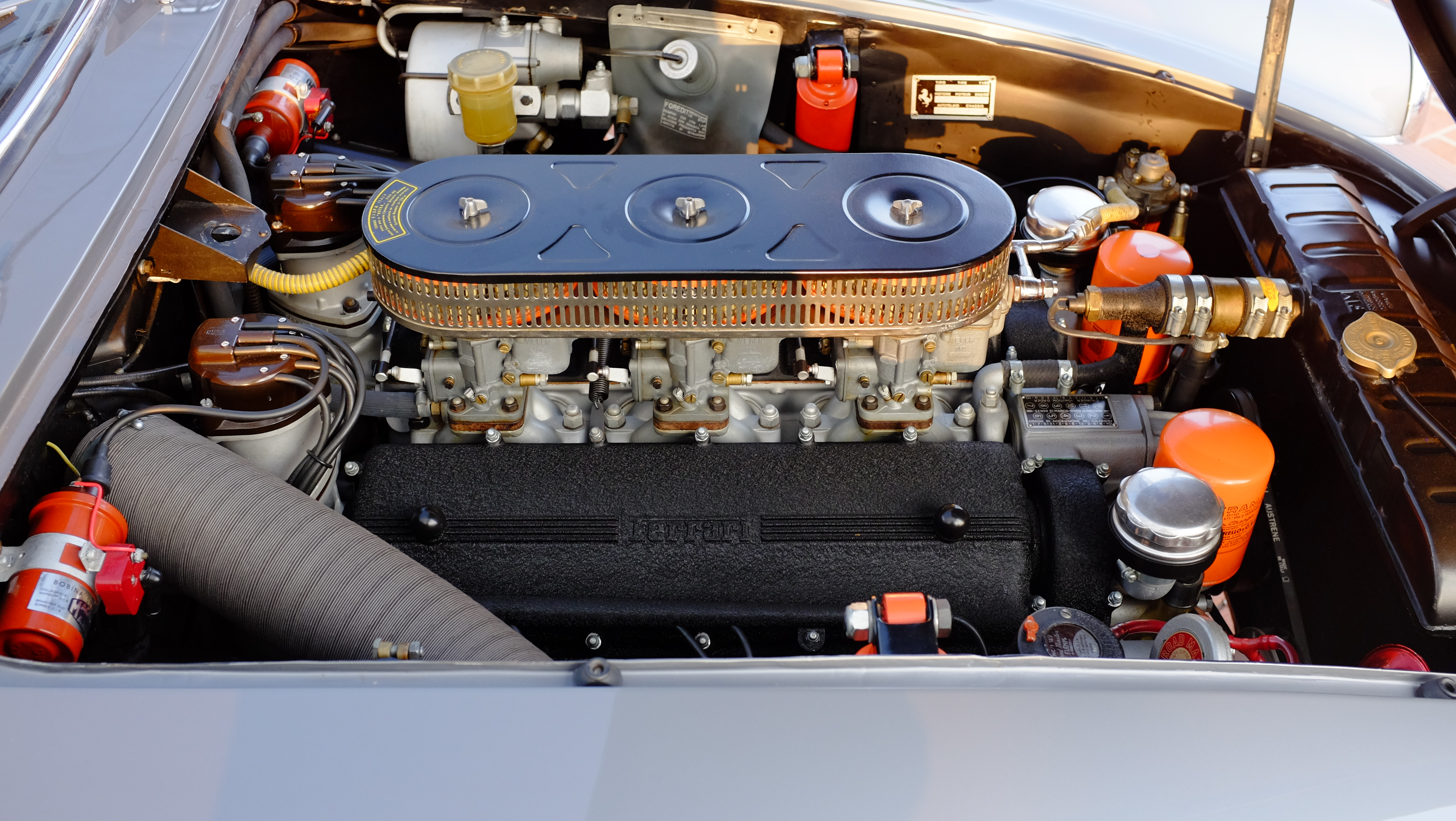
Engine compartment of a 1963 Ferrari 250 GT/L Lusso

The 250 GT/L Lusso used a Colombo-designed V12 engine with a displacement of 2,953.21 cc (3.0 L; 180.2 cu in). This engine developed an output of 240 hp (180 kW) at 7,500 rpm and 242 N⋅m (178 lbf⋅ft) torque at 5,500 rpm. It was able attain a maximum speed of 240 km/h (150 mph), thus becoming the fastest passenger car of that period, and required only 7 to 8 seconds to accelerate from 0 to 100 km/h (0 to 62 mph). Certain components such as the valves and the crankshaft, were derived from the engine of the 250 GT SWB, while others, such as the pistons and the cylinder block, were derived from the 250 GTE.

The engine was equally "civilized" as the interior, given that it was provided with just one overhead cam head through the cylinder bank, two chain driven valves per cylinder and three dual-barrel Weber 36 DCS carburetors, compared to the twin-cam heads and six carburetors used on high performance models.

This V12 engine suffered major smoke emissions during high acceleration and vibrations around 3,700 rpm. This was the reason that Steve McQueen, angered by the smoke in spite of persistent engine repairs, sold his 250 GT/L in 1967. The gearbox was also subject of complaints since it was too high geared.

== Heritage ==
Being the last representative of the Ferrari 250 lineage, beginning in 1952 with the 250 S, the end of the production of the 250 GT Lusso in 1964 heralded the beginning of a new generation of Ferraris, increasingly luxurious and refined, such as the Ferrari 275 and 330.

The Ferrari 250 GT Lusso also marked the conclusion of a marketing strategy of Enzo Ferrari, according to which "Ferrari racing cars were sold, for car racing lined with the traffic, so that it can make the race competitive". Thus, Ferrari became a fully functional car manufacturer that attracted important customers interested in funding its passion for motor racing.

== Notes and references ==
=== Bibliography ===
- Laban, Brian (2009). Ferrarissime (in French). Atlas publishers. ISBN 978-2-7234-7314-9.
- Lehbrink, Hartmut; W. Schlegelmilch, Rainer; von Osterroth, Jochen (2004). Ferrari (in French). Place des Victoires Publishing. ISBN 978-2-84459-078-7.
