= Counseling (The Office) =

- The Office episode
- Episode no.: Season 7 Episode 2
- Directed by: Jeffrey Blitz
- Written by: B. J. Novak
- Cinematography by: Matt Sohn
- Editing by: Claire Scanlon
- Production code: 7002
- Original air date: September 30, 2010
- Running time: 22 minutes

Guest appearance
- Eric Zuckerman as Store Salesman

Episode chronology
← Previous "Nepotism"	Next → "Andy's Play"
- The Office (American season 7)

"Counseling" is the second episode of the seventh season of the American comedy television series The Office and the shows 128th episode overall. It originally aired on NBC on September 30, 2010. The episode was written by B. J. Novak and directed by Jeffrey Blitz. "Counseling" guest stars Eric Zuckerman as a store clerk, Vincent Angelo as a vendor, and Michael Schur as Mose Schrute. Evan Peters also appears as Luke Cooper in archival footage from the previous episode.

The series depicts the everyday lives of office employees in the Scranton, Pennsylvania branch of the fictional Dunder Mifflin Paper Company. In the episode, Michael Scott (Steve Carell) is forced to have six hours of counseling with Toby Flenderson (Paul Lieberstein) after he physically reprimanded his nephew Luke (Peters), but Michael refuses to make Toby's job easy. Meanwhile, Pam Halpert (Jenna Fischer) attempts to finagle a promotion to office administrator and Dwight Schrute (Rainn Wilson) boycotts the Steamtown Mall after a shop owner refuses to serve him.

"Counseling" received mostly positive reviews from television critics. The episode was viewed by 7.36 million viewers and received a 3.7 rating among adults between the age of 18 and 49, marking a significant drop in the ratings when compared to the previous week. Despite this, the episode was the highest-rated NBC series of the night that it aired, as well as the highest-rated non-sports NBC broadcast for the week it aired.

== Synopsis ==
Michael Scott is assigned six hours of counseling with Toby Flenderson after he spanked his nephew Luke in "Nepotism", but Michael refuses to speak to Toby. One hour into their session, Toby tells Michael that he will not fill in the official assessment form unless Michael talks to him, so Michael begins telling ridiculous stories. Toby then tries the common counseling method of playing games with the client to get them to open up more. The method works, and Michael opens up to Toby about his personal history and relationships with people. He mentions seeing a baseball game with his stepfather where he was told that the team's manager deserved respect and how he never forgot that. Toby makes an important discovery that Michael needs to be liked. Michael realizes what is happening, gets angry at Toby, and denigrates his counseling ability. Toby gives up and gives Michael the official form, allowing him to fill it out however he wants. In his haste, Michael accidentally checks off on the form that he is severely depressed and homicidal. Gabe Lewis contacts Toby, confused by his extreme assessment of Michael. Although Michael initially blames Toby for the mishap, he turns his ire to Gabe, even making Toby laugh with his impression. Michael offers to return to the break room with Toby and "bang this out". By the end, they are both talking and drawing pictures.

Pam Halpert realizes that although she has her dream job of salesperson, she is not cut out for it; she makes few sales and little money. A visit from a vendor gives her an idea to finagle a promotion to office administrator for some added income. She informs Gabe of her promotion from before the Sabre buyout and tells him she has not been paid accordingly. Gabe promises he will get the missing wages if she can get all of the department heads to sign off on it. While she is busy convincing everyone that she has become the new administrator, Gabe catches on that she might be lying, and confronts her about it. Using a strategy she learned from watching poker, she stands her ground against Gabe and becomes de facto office administrator.

Dwight Schrute has decided to boycott the Steamtown Mall after a shop owner refuses to serve him, going so far as to cancel orders to businesses there, including those of the other salesmen. Jim Halpert and the rest of the office convince Dwight to get revenge on the shop owner by using a high-class appearance, and then refusing to buy from the shop, a scheme the office references from the movie Pretty Woman. Using tips from the rest of the office to make himself appear more sophisticated, Dwight, with Jim and Andy Bernard, return to the shop. To their surprise, the shop owner immediately recognizes Dwight even in his new attire, and explains that he did not serve him before because he was frightened by Dwight's blood-soaked hands (actually beet juice). Dwight, flustered from the truth of the situation being revealed to him, stumbles over his words before finally saying the line he came there to say, "You made a big mistake. Huge!" The group leaves somewhat embarrassed, but not before Dwight buys what he came for: a pewter wizard statuette holding a crystal ball.

== Production ==
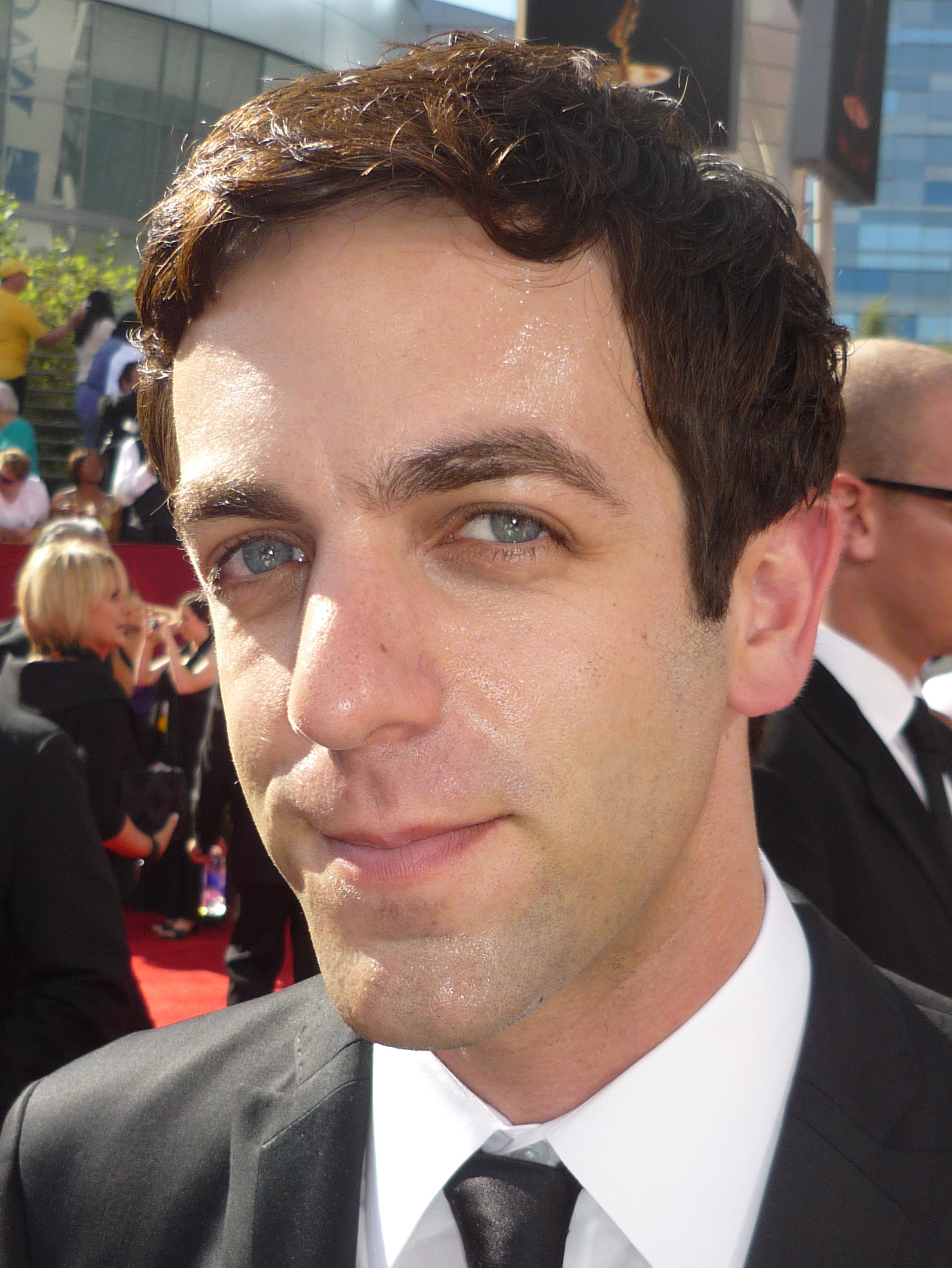
"Counseling" was written by B. J. Novak, who also plays Ryan on the show.

"Counseling" was written by B. J. Novak, a producer and screenwriter for the series who also portrays the character of Ryan Howard on the show. The entry was directed by Jeffrey Blitz, who had also directed the previous episode "Nepotism". "Counseling" features Eric Zuckerman, Vincent Angelo and Michael Schur in guest appearances as a store teller, a vendor, and Mose Schrute, respectively. Evan Peters also appears as Luke Cooper in archival footage from the previous episode. With the seventh season of The Office being Carell's last, the writers decided to divide the season into two distinct halves; the first half would "celebrate Carell's finale year and highlight different actors on the show", whereas the second half would focus on his departure and the search for a new manager. As such, "Counseling" was one of the first episodes of the season to specifically highlight other characters, in this case Lieberstein's character, Toby.

The Season Seven DVD contains a number of deleted scenes from this episode. Notable cut scenes include Stanley discussing boycotting Kellogg's, Dwight putting on his fancy clothing, Dwight getting his pipe from Creed, Kevin giving Dwight a tissue, extended footage of Michael's counseling session, Michael discussing dogs, and extended footage of Dwight in the mall.

== Cultural references ==
At Dwight's daycare, a poster for the American hip hop duo Insane Clown Posse is hung on the wall; however, Dwight has scribbled out the words "Insane" and "Posse" to make it fit into the daycare. In the episode, Dwight's subplot is inspired by Julia Roberts's character in the film Pretty Woman. Dwight even attempts to use Roberts's line, "Big mistake", but instead renders it as "You made a big mistake. Huge!" During Michael's counseling session, he sardonically tells Toby that he was probed by ALF, the alien star of the eponymous television series. Michael and Toby later pass the time playing Connect Four. Darryl notes to Pam that he saw a TLC show about Kate Walsh's home office, and he wants one similar.

== Reception ==
In its original American broadcast, "Counseling" was viewed by an estimated 7.36 million viewers with a 3.7 rating/10% share among adults between the ages of 18 and 49. This means that it was seen by 3.7 percent of all 18- to 49-year-olds, and 10 percent of all 18- to 49-year-olds watching television at the time of the broadcast. This marked a decrease in a million viewers and a 14 percent decrease in the 18–49 demographic from the previous episode. The episode became the highest-rated non-sports related NBC program for the original week it aired and also became the twenty-first most-watched show for the week of broadcast among adults aged 18–49.

Joel Keller of AOL TV called it a "vast improvement" from the previous episode "Nepotism", because he felt that "everyone at Dunder-Mifflin [sic] Scranton acted like themselves". Keller called Toby and Michael's counseling session "great" and enjoyed the way Toby was able to trick Michael. Kelly Gerlach of TV Equals enjoyed the episode and noted that it "felt like the earlier seasons" because "there wasn't forced humor, nothing made me cringe in my seat because of bad writing, and the awkward situations were written specifically to be awkward." In the end, she called the episode "decent".

Alan Sepinwall of HitFix felt that the main story employed "one of the show's most reliable running jokes". Furthermore, he felt that Michael softening to Toby was an interesting element to the episode, and he wondered if "this was a one-time thing, or if Michael's treatment of Toby will be softened, even a little." Sepinwall also felt that Pam's story was the stronger of the two subplots, and felt that an office controlled by her would be interesting. Dan Forcella of TV Fanatic awarded the episode four out of five stars and called it "pleasant". He wrote that each of the three stories "weren't flat out funny" but were "enjoyable". Furthermore, he positively commented on the main plot, noting that the Michael and Toby rivalry was fun.

Myles McNutt of The A.V. Club awarded the episode a "C" grade. While he enjoyed the main storyline revolving around Michael and Toby and felt that it "came together both comically and dramatically at the end of the day", he felt the rest of the episode was "quite uneven" with elements that were "ridiculous", such as how Pam attained her new job. McNutt's largest complaint with the remainder of the episode was that neither ended in "a logical place"; he felt Dwight's plot featured a disconnect from the character, and that Pam's story was "lazy".
