= Barbara Minty =

American fashion model

- Born: June 11, 1953 (age 72); Seattle, Washington, U.S.
- Occupations: Model, photographer
- Spouse: Steve McQueen (m. 1980; died 1980)

Barbara Minty (born June 11, 1953), also known as Barbara Minty McQueen, is a former fashion model who was the third wife and widow of American film star Steve McQueen.

== Biography ==
Minty was born in Seattle, Washington, and spent several years growing up in Corvallis, Oregon, graduating from Corvallis High School in 1971.

Minty was signed with power agents Eileen Ford. McQueen saw Minty's photo in an advertisement and had his agent arrange a meeting with her. After dating for a few months, they were married on January 16, 1980, and she was by his side until his death in November of that year. She is the author of a book about their time together, Steve McQueen – The Last Mile.

In 2012, Minty joined forces with the Asbestos Disease Awareness Organization in the fight to ban asbestos, which may have caused the cancer that killed her husband.
