= Nobody but Me (Human Beinz album) =

Studio album by The Human Beinz
- Released: 1968
- Recorded: 1967
- Studio: Cleveland Recording
- Genre: Rock, garage rock
- Length: 28:40
- Label: Capitol Records
- Producer: Lex de Azevedo

The Human Beinz chronology
Nobody but Me (1968)	Evolutions (1968)

Singles from Nobody but Me
- 1. "Nobody but Me" Released: August 24, 1967; 2. "Turn on Your Love Light" Released: February 1968

Professional ratings
Review scores
Source	Rating
Allmusic	3/5 stars

Nobody but Me is the debut studio album released by the American rock band The Human Beinz, in 1968 on Capitol Records.

== Background ==
After three singles of cover songs on smaller labels, The Human Beinz signed with Capitol Records, who misspelled the group's name on their contract, leaving out the "g" (Beingz originally). They went into the recording studio in the summer of 1967 to record their debut album. The sessions started with an attempt to record "You Don't Love Me", a Willie Cobbs song that Sonny and Cher had recently covered. When that didn't work out, they recorded "Nobody but Me" from The Isley Brothers. They replaced the dances "The Jerk" and "The Twist" with The Boogaloo and The Shingaling. Several other covers and some original material written by their producer/songwriter Lex de Azevedo filled out the album. The resulting album was not as successful as the single "Nobody but Me", which reached number 8 on the Billboard Hot 100. The second single "Turn on Your Love Light" reached number 80. The album itself charted as high as number 65 on the Billboard 200, and was on the charts for ten weeks.

== Track listing ==
=== Side one ===
1. "Nobody but Me" (Ronald Isley, Rudolph Isley, O'Kelly Isley, Jr.) – 2:22
2. "Foxey Lady" (Jimi Hendrix) – 2:41
3. "The Shaman" (Lex de Azevedo) – 2:30
4. "Flower Grave" (John Belley) – 2:19
5. "Dance on Through" (Dick Whittington) – 3:08
6. "Turn on Your Love Light" (Joseph Wade Scott, Deadric Malone) – 2:17

=== Side two ===
1. "It's Fun to Be Clean" (de Azevedo) – 2:12
2. "Black is the Color of My True Love's Hair" (Traditional arranged by de Azevedo) – 4:31
3. "This Lonely Town" (Bob Sherl, Lon Leatherwood) – 2:29
4. "Sueño" (Mel Pachuta, Mike Tatman, Belley, Ting Markulin) – 2:10
5. "Serenade to Sarah" (de Azevedo) – 2:01

== Personnel ==
=== The Human Beinz ===
- John "Dick" Belley – vocals, lead guitar
- Joe "Ting" Markulin – guitar, vocals
- Mel Pachuta – bass, vocals
- Mike Tatman – drums

=== Technical ===
- Alexis de Azevedo – producer

== Charts ==
Singles

Year	Single	Chart	Position
1968	"Nobody but Me"	Billboard Hot 100	8
1968	"Turn on Your Love Light"	Billboard Hot 100	80
