= Sand Pebbles =

Sand Pebbles may refer to:

- The Sand Pebbles (novel), 1962 novel about an American gunboat and its crew on the Yangtze River in the 1920s
- The Sand Pebbles (film), a 1966 film of the book starring Steve McQueen
- Sand Pebbles (rock band), an Australian psychedelic rock band (mainly 2001–2012)
- The Sandpebbles (R&B group), an American R&B group with one hit "Love Power" (1967)
