= Nobody but Me (Isley Brothers song) =

Song by The Isley Brothers

Single by The Isley Brothers
- B-side: "I'm Laughing to Keep from Crying"
- Released: December 1962
- Recorded: 1962
- Genre: Rock and roll; R&B
- Length: 2:01
- Label: Wand
- Songwriters: Ronald Isley, Rudolph Isley, O'Kelly Isley, Jr.
- Producer: Bert Berns

The Isley Brothers singles chronology
"Twistin' with Linda" (1962)	"Nobody but Me" (1962)	"I Say Love" (1963)

"Nobody but Me"

Single by The Human Beinz

from the album Nobody but Me
- B-side: "Sueno"
- Released: August 24, 1967
- Studio: Cleveland Recording Company
- Length: 2:17
- Label: Capitol
- Songwriters: Ronald Isley; Rudolph Isley; O'Kelly Isley, Jr.
- Producer: Alexis de Azevedo

"Nobody but Me" is a song written by O'Kelly, Rudolph, and Ronald Isley of The Isley Brothers and first recorded by The Isley Brothers in 1962.

The most commercially successful and widely known version to date is the 1968 US Top 10 hit by The Human Beinz, which was their only major chart success.

== The Isley Brothers ==
The Isley Brothers' original version, released as a single on Wand 131, failed to make the pop or R&B charts.

== The Human Beinz ==
The song was covered by Youngstown, Ohio's The Human Beinz and made them one-hit wonders after it reached number eight on the Billboard pop singles chart in 1968, and number four in Canada. It was included on some versions of Lenny Kaye's Nuggets compilation.

Dave Marsh, in his Book of Rock Lists named the version by the Human Beinz "The most negative song to hit the Top 40," noting that the word "no" is sung over 100 times in a mere 2:16. Marsh also counts the word "nobody" 46 times more; he adds "for balance, they throw in the word Yeah once".

== Other versions, uses, and appearances ==
Liverpool group The Mojos released it in 1964 (The Mojos EP, Decca Records).

Experimental group The Residents sampled it in the track "N-Er-Gee (Crisis Blues)" from their 1974 album Meet the Residents.

The French group The Dogs recorded their rendition in 1979 and included on the album Different.

George Thorogood and the Destroyers recorded a version more faithful to the Human Beinz cover than to the Isleys' original, and released it on 1982's Bad to the Bone. It reached number 29 in Canada.

Canadian band Doug and the Slugs released their cover in 1983.

The L.A. punk band the Dickies recorded a lightning-fast version of the song on their 1998 all-covers album, Dogs from the Hare that Bit Us.

Garage/punk musician Nobunny reworked it for his track "Nobunny Loves You".

A lip-sync of the Human Beinz version was used in the cold open of the first episode of the seventh season of the American TV series The Office, "Nepotism", featuring all the characters of the show.

A cover was featured in at least four television commercials: in a 1987 Friskies cat food commercial, where the line "like we do" was changed to "like Friskies"; in the mid to late 1980s for Mita Photocopiers and Idaho Potatoes (both with significantly altered lyrics); in the early 2010s for Nike; and in the mid-2010s for the Dish Network.

A parody of this was performed by the CBS Orchestra on The Late Show With David Letterman for the "Know Your Current Events" audience participation game (particularly the repeated "no" part, as the homonym "know").

The Human Beinz version has been featured in many movies as well, such as when Mike Sarne sings it in the film Seaside Swingers (1965) under the title "Indubitably Me". It also appears in Troop Beverly Hills, The Departed (when Billy gets into a brawl in a store), Recess: School's Out (as the students and teachers of Third Street School face off against Phillium Benedict and his henchmen), and Kill Bill Vol. 1 (when the Bride fights the Crazy 88s).

== See also ==
- List of 1960s one-hit wonders in the United States
