= List of most expensive cars sold at auction =

This is a list of the most expensive cars sold in public auto auctions through the traditional bidding process. The record is held by a 1955 Mercedes-Benz 300 SLR Uhlenhaut coupe sold in 2022 for €135 million to a private collector.

This list only consists of those sold for at least $4 million in auction sales during a traditional bidding process, inclusive of the mandatory buyers premium and does not include private, unsuccessful (failing to reach its reserve price, incomplete) and out-of-auction sales.

== List ==
Indicates overall record
Indicates year record

Sortable table
Date	MY	Car	s/n	Auctioneer	Locale	Original price	Adjusted	Notes	Source
May 5, 2022	1955	Mercedes-Benz 300SLR Uhlenhaut coupe	196.110-00008/55	RM Sotheby's	Stuttgart, Germany	US$143,000,000	$157,326,000	(Note: A record for a Mercedes-Benz.) (Note: A record for a German car.)	
February 1, 2025	1954	Mercedes-Benz W196R Stromlinienwagen	00009/54	RM Sotheby's	Stuttgart, Germany	US$53,917,370	$55,336,000		
November 13, 2023	1962	Ferrari 330 LM / 250 GTO	3765LM	RM Sotheby's	New York City, New York, United States	US$51,705,000	$54,636,000	(Note: A record for a Ferrari.) (Note: A record for an Italian car.) (Note: Record for an auction taking place in the United States.)	
August 26, 2018	1962	Ferrari 250 GTO	3413GT	RM Sotheby's	Monterey, California, United States	US$48,405,000	$62,062,000		
August 14, 2026	1964	Shelby Daytona	CSX2300	Gooding Christie's	Monterey, California, United States	US$42,905,000	$42,905,000	(Note: A record for an AC/Shelby American.) (Note: A record for an American car.)	
August 16, 2026	2026	Ferrari Luce "Tailor Made"	ZFF21BUA8T0338000	RM Sotheby's	Monterey, California, United States	US$40,000,000	$40,000,000		
January 18, 2026	1962	Ferrari 250 GTO	3729GT	Mecum	Kissimmee, Florida, United States	US$38,500,000	$38,500,000		
August 14, 2014	1962	Ferrari 250 GTO	3851GT	Bonhams	Carmel, California, United States	US$38,115,000	$51,836,000		
February 5, 2025	1964	Ferrari 250 LM	5893	RM Sotheby's	Paris, France	US$36,344,960	$38,405,000		
February 15, 2016	1957	Ferrari 335 S	0674	Artcurial	Paris, France	US$35,730,510	$47,907,000	(Note: A record for an auction held in France, other than those held in the fiscally separate principality of Monaco.)	
August 15, 2026	1996	McLaren F1 GTR	10R	RM Sotheby's	Monterey, California, United States	US$34,655,000	$34,655,000		
August 18, 2023	1967	Ferrari 412P	0854	Bonhams	Carmel, California, United States	US$30,255,000	$31,970,000		
July 12, 2013	1954	Mercedes-Benz W196	196 196 010 00006/54	Bonhams	Goodwood, West Sussex, United Kingdom	US$29,600,000	$40,911,000	(Note: A record for an auction held in the United Kingdom.) (Note: A record for a Formula One car.)	
December 10, 2015	1956	Ferrari 290 MM	0626	RM Sotheby's	New York City, New York, United States	US$28,050,000	$38,100,000		
August 17, 2013	1967	Ferrari 275 GTB/4*S NART Spider	10709	RM Auctions	Monterey, California, United States	US$27,500,000	$38,009,000	(Note: A record for a road car.)	
August 16, 2014	1964	Ferrari 275 GTB/C Speciale	06701	RM Auctions	Monterey, California, United States	US$26,400,000	$35,904,000		
August 16, 2025	2025	Ferrari Daytona SP3 "Tailor Made"	599+1	RM Sotheby's	Monterey, California, United States	US$26,000,000	$26,000,000		
August 15, 2025	1961	Ferrari 250 GT SWB California Spider Competizione	2383 GT	Gooding Christie's	Pebble Beach, United States	US$25,305,000	$25,971,000		
August 25, 2014	1955	Ferrari 410 Sport	0592CM	Rick Cole Auctions	Monterey, California, United States	US$23,000,000	$31,279,871		
August 19, 2017	1956	Aston Martin DBR1	DBR1/1	RM Sotheby's	Monterey, California, United States	US$22,550,000	$29,618,687	(Note: A record for an Aston Martin.) (Note: A record for a British car.)	
August 20, 2022	1955	Ferrari 410 Sport Spider	0598 CM	RM Sotheby's	Monterey, California, United States	US$22,005,000	$24,209,504		
December 8, 2018	1956	Ferrari 290 MM	0628	RM Sotheby's	Los Angeles, California, United States	US$22,005,000	$28,213,000		
August 25, 2018	1935	Duesenberg SSJ	2594	Gooding & Company	Pebble Beach, California, United States	US$22,000,000	$28,206,997		
August 19, 2016	1955	Jaguar D-Type	XKD 501	RM Sotheby's	Monterey, California, United States	US$21,780,000	$29,218,178	(Note: A record for a Jaguar.)	
August 26, 2018	1963	Aston Martin DP215	DP215	RM Sotheby's	Monterey, California, United States	US$21,455,000	$27,508,233		
November 24, 2025	2025	Gordon Murray Automotive S1 LM	001	RM Sotheby's	Las Vegas, Nevada, United States	US$20,630,000	$21,173,000		
August 14, 2021	1995	McLaren F1	029	Gooding & Company	Pebble Beach, California, United States	US$20,465,000	$24,315,225		
August 15, 2019	1994	McLaren F1 'LM-Specification'	018	RM Sotheby's	Monterey, California, United States	US$19,805,000	$24,939,916		
August 20, 2016	1939	Alfa Romeo 8C 2900B Lungo Spider	412041	RM Sotheby's	Monterey, California, United States	US$19,800,000	$26,561,980	(Note: A record for an Alfa Romeo.)	
February 11, 2019	1939	Alfa Romeo 8C 2900B Touring Berlinetta	412024	Artcurial	Paris, France	US$18,997,883	$23,924,000		
November 17, 2023	2013	Mercedes F1 W04	F1W04-04	RM Sotheby's	Las Vegas, United States	US$18,815,000	$18,815,000		
February 6, 2015	1961	Ferrari 250 GT SWB California Spyder	2935GT	Artcurial	Paris, France	US$18,454,304	$25,128,000	(Note: A record for a vehicle owned by a celebrity.) (Note: A record for a barn find.)	
June 27, 2014	1954	Ferrari 375 Plus Spider	0384	Bonhams	Goodwood, West Sussex, United Kingdom	US$18,400,177	$25,024,000		
August 20, 2016	1959	Ferrari 250 GT LWB California Spyder Competizione	1603 GT	Gooding & Company	Pebble Beach, California, United States	US$18,150,000	$24,348,482		
March 2, 2023	1962	Ferrari 250 GT SWB California Spyder	3099 GT	Gooding & Company	Amelia Island, Florida, United States	US$18,045,000	$18,045,000		
January 18, 2026	2003	Ferrari Enzo	ZFFCW56A330135262	Mecum	Kissimmee, Florida, United States	US$17,875,000	$17,875,000		
August 13, 2015	1964	Ferrari 250 LM	6105	RM Auctions	Monterey, California, United States	US$17,600,000	$23,906,000		
March 11, 2016	1961	Ferrari 250 GT SWB California Spyder	2871 GT	Gooding & Company	Amelia Island, Florida, United States	US$17,160,000	$23,020,000		
August 17, 2015	1961	Ferrari 250 GT SWB California Spyder	3095GT	Gooding & Company	Pebble Beach, California, United States	US$16,830,000	$22,860,000		
August 17, 2015	1962	Ferrari 250 GT SWB Berlinetta Speciale Bertone	3269GT	Gooding & Company	Pebble Beach, California, United States	US$16,500,000	$22,412,000		
August 21, 2011	1957	Ferrari 250 Testa Rossa	0666TR	Gooding & Company	Pebble Beach, California, United States	US$16,390,000	$23,458,000		
August 18, 2017	1995	McLaren F1	044	Bonhams	Carmel, California, United States	US$15,620,000	$20,516,000	(Note: A record for a McLaren.)	
August 16, 2014	1961	Ferrari 250 GT SWB California Spyder	2903 GT	Gooding & Company	Pebble Beach, California, United States	US$15,180,000	$20,645,000		
November 9, 2022	2003	Ferrari F2003-GA	229	RM Sotheby's	Geneva, Switzerland	US$14,865,442	$16,354,691		
August 19, 2017	1966	Ferrari 275 GTB/C	9051	Gooding & Company	Pebble Beach, California, United States	US$14,520,000	$19,071,545		
November 21, 2013	1964	Ferrari 250 LM	6107	RM Auctions	New York City, New York, United States	US$14,300,000	$19,765,000		
December 10, 2015	1962	Aston Martin DB4 GT Zagato	DB4GT/0186/R	RM Auctions	New York City, New York, United States	US$14,300,000	$19,423,000		
August 19, 2017	1970	Porsche 917K	917-024	Gooding & Company	Pebble Beach, California, United States	US$14,080,000	$18,493,619	(Note: A record for a Porsche.)	
August 13, 2015	1998	McLaren F1 'LM-Specification'	073	RM Auctions	Monterey, California, United States	US$13,750,000	$18,676,000		
August 19, 2016	1962	Shelby 260 Cobra	CSX 2000	RM Sotheby's	Monterey, California, United States	US$13,750,000	$18,445,819		
August 20, 2016	1960	Ferrari 250 GT SWB Berlinetta Competizione	1759 GT	Gooding & Company	Pebble Beach, California, United States	US$13,500,000	$18,110,441		
March 5, 2022	1937	Talbot-Lago T150-C SS	90107	Gooding & Company	Amelia Island, United States	US$13,425,000	$14,769,943		
August 18, 2023	1957	Jaguar XKSS	XKSS 707	RM Sotheby's	Monterey, California, United States	US$13,205,000	$13,205,000		
August 13, 2015	1956	Ferrari 250 GT Berlinetta 'Tour de France'	0557GT	RM Auctions	Monterey, California, United States	US$13,200,000	$17,929,000		
August 14, 2015	1953	Jaguar C-Type Works Lightweight	XKC 052	RM Auctions	Monterey, California, United States	US$13,200,000	$17,929,000		
May 20, 2023	1972	Ferrari 312 PB	0886	RM Sotheby's	Cernobbio, Italy	US$13,027,576	$13,027,576		
July 13, 2018	1961	Aston Martin DB4 GT Zagato MP209	DB4GT/0183/R	Bonhams	Goodwood, West Sussex, United Kingdom	US$12,978,264	$16,640,000		
May 25, 2013	1953	Ferrari 340/375 MM Berlinetta 'Competizione'	0320AM	RM Auctions	Cernobbio, Italy	US$12,812,800	$17,709,000	(Note: A record for an auction held in Italy.)	
May 17, 2009	1957	Ferrari 250 Testa Rossa	0714TR	RM Auctions	Maranello, Emilia-Romagna, Italy	US$12,402,500	$18,612,000		
August 21, 2016	1933	Alfa Romeo 8C 2300 Monza	2311218	Gooding & Company	Pebble Beach, California, United States	US$11,990,000	$16,084,755		
August 19, 2012	1936	Mercedes-Benz 540K Special Roadster	130949	Gooding & Company	Pebble Beach, California, United States	US$11,770,000	$16,506,000		
August 15, 2014	1964	Ferrari 250 LM	6045	RM Auctions	Monterey, California, United States	US$11,550,000	$15,708,000		
October 14, 2015	1960	Ferrari 250 GT SWB Berlinetta	1995GT	H&H Classics	Duxford, Cambridgeshire, United Kingdom	US$11,440,968	$15,540,000		
August 19, 2012	1960	Ferrari 250 GT LWB California Spyder Competizione	1639 GT	Gooding & Company	Pebble Beach, California, United States	US$11,275,000	$15,812,000		
August 16, 2025	1993	Ferrari F40 LM	95448	RM Sotheby's	Monterey, California, United States	US$11,005,000	$11,295,000		
August 17, 2012	1968	Ford GT40	P/1074	RM Auctions	Monterey, California, United States	US$11,000,000	$15,426,000	(Note: A record for a Ford.)	
May 18, 2008	1961	Ferrari 250 GT SWB California Spyder	2377GT	RM Auctions; Sotheby's	Maranello, Emilia-Romagna, Italy	US$10,894,900	$16,292,000		
August 13, 2021	1959	Ferrari 250 GT LWB California Spyder Competizione	1235 GT	Gooding & Company	Pebble Beach, California, United States	US$10,840,000	$12,879,406		
January 31, 2023	2022	Bugatti Chiron Profilée		RM Sotheby's	Paris, France	US$10,608,215.25	$10,608,215.25		
August 21, 2016	1932	Bugatti Type 55	55213	Gooding & Company	Pebble Beach, California, United States	US$10,400,000	$13,951,747		
August 19, 2022	1937	Bugatti Type 57SC Atalante	57523	Gooding & Company	Pebble Beach, California, United States	US$10,345,000	$11,381,382		
August 21, 2011	1931	Duesenberg Model J Long-Wheelbase Coupe	2478	Gooding & Company	Pebble Beach, California, United States	US$10,340,000	$14,799,000	(Note: A record for a Duesenberg.)	
November 17, 2023	2002	Mercedes-Benz CLK GTR Roadster	000034	RM Sotheby's	Las Vegas, United States	US$10,235,000	$10,235,000		
August 17, 2015	1982	Porsche 956	956-003	Gooding & Company	Pebble Beach, California, United States	US$10,120,000	$13,746,000		
August 16, 2014	1967	Ferrari 275 GTB/4	10621	RM Auctions	Monterey, California, United States	US$10,175,000	$13,838,000		
September 9, 2017	2017	LaFerrari Aperta		RM Sotheby's	Maranello, Emilia-Romagna, Italy	US$9,982,000	$13,111,000		
August 19, 2022	1937	Mercedes-Benz 540 K Special Roadster	154075	RM Sotheby's	Monterey, California, United States	US$9,905,000	$10,897,302		
January 29, 2016	1937	Mercedes-Benz 540 K Special Roadster	130894	RM Sotheby's	Scottsdale, Arizona, United States	US$9,900,000	$13,281,000		
November 17, 1987	1931	Bugatti Royale Kellner Coupe	41.141	Christie's	London, United Kingdom	US$9,800,000	$27,772,000	(Note: A record for a Bugatti.) (Note: A record for a French car.)	
March 10, 2016	1937	Bugatti Type 57SC Sports Tourer	57541	Bonhams	Amelia Island, Florida, United States	US$9,735,000	$13,060,000		
August 20, 2011	1937	Mercedes-Benz 540K Spezial Roadster	154140	RM Auctions	Monterey, California, United States	US$9,680,000	$13,854,000		
January 16, 2015	1964	Ferrari 250 LM	5899	RM Auctions	Scottsdale, Arizona, United States	US$9,625,000	$13,073,000		
August 18, 2023	1962	Ferrari 250 GT SWB Berlinetta	3507 GT	Gooding & Company	Pebble Beach, California, United States	US$9,465,000	$9,465,000		
January 17, 2014	1957	Ferrari 250 GT Berlinetta 'Tour de France'	0703 GT	Gooding & Company	Scottsdale, Arizona, United States	US$9,460,000	$12,866,000		
September 9, 2017	1959	Ferrari 250 GT LWB California Spyder	1503 GT	RM Sotheby's	Maranello, Emilia-Romagna, Italy	US$9,447,000	$12,408,000		
January 15, 2015	1966	Ferrari 275 GTB Competizione	09079	Bonhams	Scottsdale, Arizona, United States	US$9,405,000	$12,775,000		
May 20, 2007	1962	Ferrari 330 TRI/LM Spider	0808	RM Auctions; Sotheby's	Maranello, Emilia-Romagna, Italy	US$9,281,250	$14,411,000		
October 26, 2024	1956	Mercedes-Benz 300 SL 'Alloy' Gullwing	198.043.5500872	RM Sotheby's	Los Angeles, California, United States	US$9,355,000	$9,355,000		
August 19, 2022	1924	Hispano-Suiza H6C "Tulipwood" Torpedo	11012	RM Sotheby's	Monterey, California, United States	US$9,245,000	$10,171,182		
August 16, 2025	1995	Ferrari F50	ZFFTG46A2S0104798	RM Sotheby's	Monterey, California, United States	US$9,245,000	$9,488,000		
August 16, 2013	1953	Ferrari 375 MM Spyder	0364AM	RM Auctions	Monterey, California, United States	US$9,075,000	$12,543,000		
September 3, 2022	1960	Ferrari 250 GT SWB Berlinetta Competizione	2021 GT	Gooding & Company	London, United Kingdom	US$8,969,988	$9,868,619		
January 17, 2014	1958	Ferrari 250 GT LWB California Spyder	1055 GT	RM Auctions	Scottsdale, Arizona, United States	US$8,800,000	$11,968,000		
August 17, 2013	1937	Bugatti Type 57SC Atalante	57523	Gooding & Company	Pebble Beach, California, United States	US$8,745,000	$12,087,000		
August 18, 2012	1962	Ferrari 250 GT SWB California Spyder	3119GT	RM Auctions	Monterey, California, United States	US$8,580,000	$12,032,000		
August 15, 2025	2020	Bugatti Divo	VF9SD3V34LM795015	Bonhams	Carmel, United States	US$8,557,500	$8,557,500		
August 14, 2015	1959	Ferrari 250 GT Berlinetta 'Interim' Competizione	1519GT	Bonhams	Carmel, California, United States	US$8,525,000	$11,579,000		
August 17, 2013	1997	McLaren F1	066	Gooding & Company	Pebble Beach, California, United States	US$8,470,000	$11,707,000		
August 19, 2017	1961	Ferrari 250 GT SWB Berlinetta	2985	RM Sotheby's	Monterey, California, United States	US$8,305,000	$10,908,346		
October 31, 2007	1937	Mercedes-Benz 540K Special Roadster	4086	RM Auctions; Sotheby's	London, United Kingdom	US$8,252,201	$12,813,000		
January 18, 2013	1958	Ferrari 250 GT LWB California Spyder	1073 GT	Gooding & Company	Scottsdale, Arizona, United States	US$8,250,000	$11,403,000		
August 17, 2012	1955	Ferrari 410 S Berlinetta Speciale	0594CM	RM Auctions	Monterey, California, United States	US$8,250,000	$11,570,000		
May 14, 2016	1951	Ferrari 340 America Barchetta	0116/A	RM Sotheby's	Monte Carlo, Monaco	US$8,250,000	$11,403,000		
August 17, 2013	1928	Mercedes-Benz 680S Torpedo Roadster	35949	RM Auctions	Monterey, California, United States	US$8,226,400	$11,370,000		
August 15, 2025	1973	Ferrari 365 GTB/4 Daytona Competizione Series III	16407	Gooding Christie's	Pebble Beach, United States	US$8,145,000	$8,359,000		
January 18, 2013	1960	Ferrari 250 GT SWB Berlinetta Competizione	1905GT	RM Auctions	Scottsdale, Arizona, United States	US$8,140,000	$11,251,000		
January 20, 2018	1965	Ferrari 275 GTB Speciale	06437	Gooding & Company	Scottsdale, Arizona, United States	US$8,085,000	$10,366,000		
August 13, 2015	1959	Ferrari 250 GT LWB California Spyder	1307GT	RM Auctions	Monterey, California, United States	US$8,050,000	$10,934,000		
August 18, 2017	1963	Jaguar E-Type Lightweight	S850664	Bonhams	Carmel, California, United States	US$8,000,000	$10,508,000		
August 14, 2015	1950	Ferrari 275 S/340 America Barchetta	0030MT	RM Auctions	Monterey, California, United States	US$7,975,000	$10,832,000		
August 17, 2008	1937	Bugatti Type 57SC Atalante Coupe	57374	Gooding & Company	Pebble Beach, California, United States	US$7,920,000	$11,843,000	(Note: Broken the then world record at Sotheby's in 1971, selling for $59,000.)	
June 29, 2012	1929	4½-Litre Supercharged 'Blower' Bentley	HB 3402	Bonhams	Goodwood, Sussex, United Kingdom	US$7,906,745	$11,088,000	(Note: A record for a Bentley.)	
May 10, 2014	1966	Ferrari 275 GTB/C	09067	RM Auctions	Monte Carlo, Monaco	US$7,860,283	$10,690,000		
August 19, 2022	1957	Ferrari 500 TRC Spider	0706 MDTR	RM Sotheby's	Monterey, California, United States	US$7,815,000	$8,597,922		
January 16, 2015	1959	Ferrari 250 GT LWB California Spyder	1425GT	Gooding & Company	Scottsdale, Arizona, United States	US$7,700,000	$10,459,000		
March 11, 2017	1937	Bugatti Type 57S Cabriolet by Vanvooren	57513	RM Sotheby's	Amelia Island, United States	US$7,700,000	$10,114,000		
August 15, 2009	1965	Shelby Daytona Cobra Coupe	CSX2601	Mecum	Monterey, California, United States	US$7,685,000	$11,533,000		
May 2, 2015	1962	Ferrari 400 Superamerica SWB Cabriolet	3309SA	RM Auctions	Fort Worth, Texas, United States	US$7,645,000	$10,384,000		
August 19, 2022	1966	Ferrari 275 GTB/C	09067	RM Sotheby's	Monterey, California, United States	US$7,595,000	$8,355,882		
August 19, 2022	1954	Ferrari 375 America Cabriolet	0353 AL	RM Sotheby's	Monterey, California, United States	US$7,595,000	$8,355,882		
August 15, 2025	1961	Ferrari 250 GT SWB California Spider	2277 GT	Gooding Christie's	Pebble Beach, United States	US$7,550,000	$7,749,000		
November 16, 2017	2001	Ferrari F2001	211	Sotheby's	New York City, New York, United States	US$7,504,000	$9,856,000		
August 19, 2022	1953	Ferrari 375 MM	0366AM	RM Sotheby's	Monterey, California, United States	US$7,485,000	$8,234,862		
August 16, 2013	1939	Mercedes-Benz 540K Special Roadster	408383	RM Auctions	Monterey, California, United States	US$7,480,000	$10,338,000		
September 3, 2004	1929	Mercedes-Benz 38/250 SSK	36045	Bonhams	Goodwood, Sussex, United Kingdom	US$7,443,070	$12,687,000		
May 23, 2015	1952	Ferrari 212 Export Touring Barchetta	0158ED	RM Auctions	Cernobbio, Lombardy, Italy	US$7,398,640	$10,049,000		
September 7, 2015	1958	Ferrari 250 GT Berlinetta 'Tour de France'	0897GT	RM Auctions	Battersea, London, United Kingdom	US$7,273,054	$9,879,000		
August 19, 2022	1938	Talbot-Lago T150-C SS	90117	RM Sotheby's	Monterey, California, United States	US$7,265,000	$7,992,822		
August 16, 2025	1957	Ferrari 250 GT LWB California Spider Prototipo	0769 GT	Gooding Christie's	Pebble Beach, United States	US$7,265,000	$7,456,000		
August 14, 2014	1953	Ferrari 250 MM Berlinetta	0312 MM	Bonhams	Carmel, California, United States	US$7,260,000	$9,874,000		
August 14, 2010	1959	Ferrari 250 GT LWB California Spyder Competizione	1603 GT	Gooding & Company	Pebble Beach, California, United States	US$7,260,000	$10,719,000		
December 3, 2007	1904	Rolls-Royce 10 hp Two-Seater	20154	Bonhams	London, United Kingdom	US$7,254,290	$11,264,000	(Note: A record for a Rolls-Royce.) (Note: A record for a pre-1905 car.)	
August 17, 2013	1955	Ferrari 250 Europa GT Berlinetta Competizione	0415GT	Gooding & Company	Pebble Beach, California, United States	US$7,150,000	$9,882,000		
November 21, 2013	1938	Talbot-Lago T150-C SS	90111	RM Auctions; Sotheby's	New York City, New York, United States	US$7,150,000	$9,882,000	(Note: A record for a Talbot-Lago.)	
May 20, 2023	1961	Ferrari 250 GT SWB Berlinetta	2347GT	RM Sotheby's	Lake Como, Italy	US$7,118,419	$7,118,419		
November 21, 2013	1959	Ferrari 250 GT SWB Berlinetta Speciale Bertone	1739GT	RM Auctions; Sotheby's	New York City, New York, United States	US$7,040,000	$9,730,000		
April 12, 2014	1964	Ford GT40 Prototype	GT/104	Mecum	Houston, Texas, United States	US$7,560,000	$10,282,000		
December 4, 2016	2016	LaFerrari		RM Sotheby's	Daytona Beach, Florida, United States	US$7,000,000	$9,390,599		
May 18, 2008	1962	Ferrari 250 LM	5845	RM Auctions; Sotheby's	Maranello, Emilia-Romagna, Italy	US$6,979,225	$10,436,000		
August 15, 2014	1965	Ford GT40 Roadster	GT/108	RM Auctions	Monterey, California, United States	US$6,930,000	$9,425,000		
August 14, 2014	1962	Ferrari 250 GT SWB Speciale Aerodinamica	3615 GT	Bonhams	Carmel, California, United States	US$6,875,000	$9,350,000		
August 19, 2022	1958	Ferrari 250 GT Cabriolet Pinin Farina Series I	0963 GT	RM Sotheby's	Monterey, California, United States	US$6,825,000	$7,508,742		
August 14, 2014	1958	Ferrari 250 GT Cabriolet Pinin Farina Series I	0759GT	Bonhams	Carmel, California, United States	US$6,820,000	$9,275,000		
August 19, 2017	1959	Aston Martin DB4GT Prototype	DP199/1	RM Sotheby's	Monterey, California, United States	US$6,765,000	$8,885,606		
August 15, 2025	2017	Ferrari LaFerrari Aperta	ZFF86ZHA0H0232856	RM Sotheby's	Monterey, California, United States	US$6,715,000	$6,892,000		
August 15, 2010	1933	Alfa Romeo 8C 2300 Monza	2311218	Gooding & Company	Pebble Beach, California, United States	US$6,710,000	$9,907,000		
August 18, 2012	1956	Ferrari 250 GT Berlinetta 'Tour de France'	0585GT	RM Auctions	Monterey, California, United States	US$6,710,000	$9,410,000		
August 18, 2023	1959	Ferrari 410 Superamerica Coupe Series III	1305 SA	RM Sotheby's	Monterey, California, United States	US$6,605,000	$6,605,000		
January 20, 2017	1939	Mercedes-Benz 540K Special Roadster by Sindelfingen	408383	RM Sotheby's	Phoenix, Arizona, United States	US$6,600,000	$8,668,884		
March 8, 2014	1939	Delahaye 135 Competition Court Torpedo Roadster	48667	RM Auctions	Amelia Island, Florida, United States	US$6,600,000	$8,976,000	(Note: A record for a Delahaye.)	
August 19, 2012	1957	Ferrari 250 GT LWB California Spyder Prototype	0769 GT	Gooding & Company	Pebble Beach, California, United States	US$6,600,000	$9,256,000		
May 12, 2012	1957	Ferrari 625 TRC Spider	0680 MDTR	RM Auctions	Monte Carlo, Monaco	US$6,526,800	$9,153,000	(Note: Record for an auction taking place in the Principality of Monaco.)	
June 15, 1986	1931	Bugatti Royale Berline de Voyage	41.150	Kruse International	Reno, Nevada, United States	US$6,500,000	$19,092,000		
August 17, 2002	1962	Ferrari 330 TRI/LM Spider	0808	RM Auctions	Monterey, California, United States	US$6,490,000	$11,617,000		
January 29, 2016	1950	Ferrari 166 MM/195 S Berlinetta Le Mans	0060 M	Gooding & Company	Scottsdale, Arizona, United States	US$6,490,000	$8,706,000		
May 10, 2014	1959	Ferrari 250 GT Cabriolet Pinin Farina Series I	1181 GT	RM Auctions	Monte Carlo, Monaco	US$6,473,174	$8,803,000		
August 15, 2019	1964	Aston Martin DB5	DB5/2008/R	RM Sotheby's	Monterey, California, United States	US$6,385,000	$8,040,000		
March 14, 2015	1960	Ferrari 400 Superamerica SWB Cabriolet	1945SA	RM Auctions	Amelia Island, Florida, United States	US$6,380,000	$8,666,000		
August 19, 2012	1955	Ferrari 857 S	0588 M	Gooding & Company	Pebble Beach, California, United States	US$6,270,000	$8,793,000		
August 19, 2022	1998	Ferrari F300	187	RM Sotheby's	Monterey, California, United States	US$6,220,000	$6,843,132		
January 18, 2014	1958	Ferrari 250 GT Cabriolet Pinin Farina Series I	0791 GT	Gooding & Company	Scottsdale, Arizona, United States	US$6,160,000	$8,378,000		
August 15, 2010	1961	Ferrari 250 GT SWB Berlinetta Competizione "SEFAC Hot Rod"	2845 GT	Gooding & Company	Pebble Beach, California, United States	US$6,105,000	$9,014,000		
August 19, 2012	1928	Bentley 4½ Litre Le Mans Sports 'Bobtail'	KM3088	Gooding & Company	Pebble Beach, California, United States	US$6,050,000	$8,484,000		
August 13, 2015	2005	Enzo Ferrari	141920	RM Auctions	Monterey, California, United States	US$6,050,000	$8,218,000		
August 19, 2022	1961	Ferrari 400 Superamerica Series I Coupé Aerodinamico	2809 SA	Gooding & Company	Pebble Beach, California, United States	US$6,000,000	$6,601,092		
August 19, 2022	1958	Ferrari 250 GT LWB California Spyder	1077 GT	RM Sotheby's	Monterey, California, United States	US$5,972,500	$6,570,837		
August 18, 2012	1972	Porsche 917/10	917/10 003	Mecum	Monterey, California, United States	US$5,830,000	$8,176,000		
February 3, 2012	1959	Ferrari 250 GT LWB California Spyder	1283GT	Artcurial	Paris, France	US$5,740,000	$8,050,000		
August 20, 2016	1956	Ferrari 250 GT Berlinetta Competizione 'Tour de France'	0507 GT	RM Sotheby's	Monterey, California, United States	US$5,720,000	$7,673,461		
August 19, 2017	1955	Ferrari 735 LM	0546 LM	RM Sotheby's	Monterey, California, United States	US$5,720,000	$7,513,033		
May 20, 2007	1953	Ferrari 340/375 MM Berlinetta Competizione	0396 AM	RM Auctions; Sotheby's	Maranello, Emilia-Romagna, Italy	US$5,692,000	$8,838,000		
September 9, 2017	1958	Ferrari 250 GT Cabriolet Pinin Farina Series I	0791 GT	RM Sotheby's	Maranello, Emilia-Romagna, Italy	US$5,675,000	$7,454,000		
March 10, 2017	1998	Porsche 911 GT1 Strassenversion	96005	Gooding & Company	Amelia Island, Florida, United States	US$5,665,000	$7,441,000		
August 20, 2000	1966	Ferrari 330 P3	0844	Christie's	Monterey, California, United States	US$5,616,000	$10,499,000		
August 19, 2022	2007	Porsche RS Spyder Evo	9R6.702	Gooding & Company	Pebble Beach, California, United States	US$5,615,000	$6,177,522		
August 13, 2021	1929	Bugatti Type 35B Grand Prix	4938	Gooding & Company	Pebble Beach, California, United States	US$5,615,000	$6,671,390		
August 17, 2014	1959	Ferrari 250 GT Cabriolet Pinin Farina Series I	1475 GT	Gooding & Company	Pebble Beach, California, United States	US$5,610,000	$7,630,000		
August 19, 2006	1958	Ferrari 412 S	0744	RM Auctions	Monterey, California, United States	US$5,610,000	$8,960,000		
August 16, 2014	1956	Aston Martin DB3S	DB3S/111	Gooding & Company	Pebble Beach, California, United States	US$5,500,000	$7,480,000		
January 21, 2007	1966	Shelby Cobra 427 Super Snake	CSX 3015	Barrett-Jackson	Scottsdale, Arizona, United States	US$5,500,000	$8,540,000		
August 20, 2016	1950	Ferrari 166 MM Berlinetta	0046 M	Gooding & Company	Pebble Beach, California, United States	US$5,445,000	$7,304,545		
August 21, 2015	1960	Porsche RS60	718-044	Gooding & Company	Pebble Beach, California, United States	US$5,400,000	$7,335,000		
August 18, 2023	1967	Ferrari 275GTB/4	10621	RM Sotheby's	Monterey, California, United States	US$5,395,000	$5,395,000		
August 18, 2023	1937	Bugatti Type 57SC Tourer	57512	RM Sotheby's	Monterey, California, United States	US$5,395,000	$5,395,000		
August 13, 2021	1928	Mercedes-Benz 26/120/180-S-Type Supercharged Sports Tourer	Chassis no. 35920 Engine no. 68674	Bonhams	Los Angeles, California, United States	US$5,395,000	$6,410,000		
March 4, 2023	2010	Pagani Zonda R Revolución	5	RM Sotheby's	Amelia Island, Florida, United States	US$5,340,000	$5,340,000		
August 19, 2022	1959	Ferrari 250 GT LWB Berlinetta 'Tour de France'	1161 GT	RM Sotheby's	Monterey, California, United States	US$5,340,000	$5,874,972		
August 16, 2025	1935	Mercedes-Benz 500 K Special Roadster	123702	RM Sotheby's	Monterey, California, United States	US$5,340,000	$5,480,000		
August 19, 2017	1959	Ferrari 410 Superamerica Series III Coupe	1305 SA	RM Sotheby's	Monterey, California, United States	US$5,335,000	$7,007,348		
March 11, 2016	1955	Porsche 550	550-0060	Gooding & Company	Amelia Island, Florida, United States	US$5,335,000	$7,157,000		
January 18, 2014	1997	McLaren F1 GTR Longtail	21R	Gooding & Company	Scottsdale, Arizona, United States	US$5,280,000	$7,181,000		
August 20, 2011	1960	Ferrari 250 GT SWB Berlinetta Competizione	2209GT	RM Auctions	Monterey, California, United States	US$5,280,000	$7,557,000		
August 16, 2025	2015	Ferrari LaFerrari	ZFF76ZFA5F0210637	RM Sotheby's	Monterey, California, United States	US$5,230,000	$5,368,000		
August 19, 2016	1955	Ferrari 750 Monza	0510M	RM Sotheby's	Monterey, California, United States	US$5,225,000	$7,009,411		
August 14, 2025	2005	Maserati MC12 Stradale	12095	Broad Arrow	Monterey, California, United States	US$5,202,500	$5,339,364		
August 17, 2012	1939	Horch 853A Special Roadster	854275	RM Auctions	Monterey, California, United States	US$5,170,000	$7,250,000	(Note: A record for a Horch.)	
August 20, 2016	2014	LaFerrari	207195	Mecum	Monterey, California, United States	US$5,170,000	$6,935,628		
January 18, 2018	1958	Porsche 550A Spyder	550A-0145	Bonhams	Scottsdale, Arizona, United States	US$5,170,000	$6,629,000		
August 16, 2009	1962	Ferrari 250 GT SWB California Spyder	3163 GT	Gooding & Company	Pebble Beach, California, United States	US$5,115,000	$7,676,000		
July 23, 2004	1930	Bentley Speed Six Tourer	HM2868	Christie's	Le Mans, Sarthe, France	US$5,109,665	$8,710,000		
October 8, 2023	1959	Ferrari 250 GT Berlinetta 'Tour de France'	1401GT	Bonhams	Knokke-Heist, Belgium	US$5,101,929	$5,101,929		
August 16, 2015	1957	Ferrari 410 Superamerica Series II Coupe	0717SA	Gooding & Company	Pebble Beach, California, United States	US$5,087,500	$6,910,000		
March 4, 2023	1995	Ferrari F50	036/349	RM Sotheby's	Amelia Island, Florida, United States	US$5,065,000	$5,065,000		
August 19, 2022	1955	Mercedes-Benz 300 SL Alloy Gullwing	198.043.5500786	RM Sotheby's	Monterey, California, United States	US$5,010,000	$5,511,912		
July 13, 2018	1957	BMW 507	70067	Bonhams	London, England	US$5,000,000	$6,667,000		
August 15, 2008	1960	Jaguar E2A	E2A	Bonhams	Carmel, California, United States	US$4,957,000	$7,413,000		
January 17, 2009	1960	Ferrari 250 GT SWB California Spyder	1963 GT	Gooding & Company	Scottsdale, Arizona, United States	US$4,950,000	$7,428,000		
August 18, 2007	1959	Ferrari 250 GT LWB California Spyder Competizione	1451GT	RM Auctions	Monterey, California, United States	US$4,950,000	$7,686,000		
May 11, 2018	1993	McLaren MP4/8A	MP4/8-6	Bonhams	Monte Carlo, Monaco	US$4,948,432	$6,345,000		
February 5, 2014	1955	Jaguar D-Type	XKD 520	RM Auctions	Paris, France	US$4,947,835	$6,729,000		
March 18, 2022	1968	Porsche 907	907-031	Artcurial	Paris, France	US$4,872,971	$4,872,971		
August 15, 2025	1958	Ferrari 250 GT Tour de France Berlinetta	0925 GT	Gooding Christie's	Pebble Beach, United States	US$4,850,000	$4,978,000		
August 14, 2008	1939	Talbot-Lago T150C SS Teardrop coupe	90120	Bonhams	Carmel, California, United States	US$4,847,000	$7,248,000		
August 17, 2013	1948	Alfa Romeo 6C 2500 Competizione	920.002	Gooding & Company	Pebble Beach, California, United States	US$4,840,000	$6,690,000		
August 20, 2016	1966	Ford GT40 Mk 1	P/1028	Mecum	Monterey, California, United States	US$4,840,000	$6,492,928		
August 20, 2016	1979	Porsche 935	009 0030	Gooding & Company	Pebble Beach, California, United States	US$4,840,000	$6,492,928		
May 10, 2014	1956	Maserati 450S Prototype	3501; 4501; 350SI-10	RM Auctions	Monte Carlo, Monaco	US$4,816,350	$6,550,000		
December 1, 2013	1952	Jaguar C-Type	XKC 042	Bonhams	London, United Kingdom	US$4,794,407	$6,627,000		
May 21, 2011	1955	Ferrari 375 MM Berlinetta	0490AM	RM Auctions	Tivoli, Lazio, Italy	US$4,794,720	$6,862,000		
August 18, 2023	1914	Mercer Type 35-J Raceabout	1967	Gooding & Company	Pebble Beach, California, United States	US$4,790,000	$4,790,000		
August 18, 2012	1953	Ferrari 340 MM Spider	0350 AM	Gooding & Company	Pebble Beach, California, United States	US$4,730,000	$6,633,000		
August 19, 2022	1935	Duesenberg Model J Convertible Coupe	2576	RM Sotheby's	Monterey, California, United States	US$4,680,000	$5,148,851		
February 10, 2017	1965	Dino Berlinetta Speciale	0840	Artcurial	Paris, France	US$4,675,776	$6,141,000	(Note: A record for a Dino (automobile).)	
August 16, 2013	1931	Bentley 4½ Litre Supercharged Le Mans	MS 3944	Bonhams	Carmel, California, United States	US$4,647,500	$6,424,000		
August 19, 2022	1995	Ferrari F50	ZFFTG46A0S0104220	Gooding & Company	Pebble Beach, California, United States	US$4,625,000	$5,088,341		
August 17, 2014	1965	Ferrari 275 GTB Long Nose Alloy	07993	Gooding & Company	Pebble Beach, California, United States	US$4,620,000	$6,283,000		
August 14, 2010	1962	Ferrari 375 MM Berlinetta	0416AM	RM Auctions	Monterey, California, United States	US$4,620,000	$6,821,000		
January 20, 2012	1955	Mercedes-Benz 300SL	5500208	Gooding & Company	Scottsdale, Arizona, United States	US$4,620,000	$6,479,000		
January 19, 2013	1966	Batmobile	1	Barrett-Jackson	Scottsdale, Arizona, United States	US$4,620,000	$6,386,000		
August 20, 2011	1939	Mercedes-Benz 540K Spezial Roadster	408383	RM Auctions	Monterey, California, United States	US$4,620,000	$6,612,000		
October 7, 2011	1884	De Dion, Bouton et Trépardoux Dos-à-Dos Steam Runabout "La Marquise"	6	RM Auctions	Hershey, Pennsylvania, United States	US$4,620,000	$6,612,000	(Note: Oldest car to appear on the list.)	
October 27, 2010	1964	Aston Martin DB5	DB5/1486/R	RM Auctions	London, United Kingdom	US$4,620,000	$6,821,000	(Note: A record for a vehicle used as a theatrical property.)	
March 18, 2022	1996	Ferrari F50	105265	Artcurial	Paris, France	US$4,619,022	$4,619,022		
August 14, 2010	1938	Talbot-Lago T150C Lago Speciale Teardrop Coupe	90034	RM Auctions	Monterey, California, United States	US$4,620,000	$6,804,000		
August 18, 2023	1933	Alfa Romeo 8C 2300 Cabriolet	2311214	Gooding & Company	Pebble Beach, California, United States	US$4,515,000	$4,515,000		
August 24, 2018	1998	Mercedes-Benz CLK GTR	09/25	RM Sotheby's	Monterey, California, United States	US$4,515,000	$5,789,000		
August 19, 2007	1931	Bentley 4 Litre "The Green Hornet"	SM3916	Gooding & Company	Pebble Beach, California, United States	US$4,510,000	$7,003,000		
August 14, 2008	1961	Ferrari 250 GT SWB Berlinetta	3087 GT	RM Auctions	Monterey, California, United States	US$4,510,000	$6,744,000		
August 18, 2012	1957	Ferrari 500 TRC	0662 MDTR	Gooding & Company	Pebble Beach, California, United States	US$4,510,000	$6,325,000		
March 9, 2013	1935	Duesenberg Model SJ Convertible Coupe	2405	RM Auctions; Sotheby's	Amelia Island, Florida, United States	US$4,510,000	$6,233,000		
May 21, 2011	1938	Talbot-Lago T150C SS Teardrop Coupé	90112	RM Auctions	Tivoli, Lazio, Italy	US$4,475,072	$6,405,000		
August 8, 2025	2014	Ferrari LaFerrari	ZFF76ZFA2E0207435	Bring a Trailer	Newport Beach, California, United States	US$4,475,000			[378]
November 21, 2013	1955	Maserati A6G/2000 Spyder	2101	RM Auctions; Sotheby's	New York City, New York, United States	US$4,455,000	$6,157,000	(Note: A record for a Maserati.)	
August 15, 2025	2023	Bugatti Chiron Super Sport	VF9SW3V31PM795053	Bonhams	Carmel, United States	US$4,460,000	$4,577,000		
January 20, 2018	1954	Ferrari 500 Mondial Series I	0434MD	Gooding & Company	Scottsdale, Arizona, United States	US$4,455,000	$5,712,000		
August 19, 2007	1959	Ferrari 250 GT LWB California Spyder	1431GT	Gooding & Company	Pebble Beach, California, United States	US$4,455,000	$6,917,000		
June 26, 2015	1935	Aston Martin Ulster	LM19	Bonhams	Goodwood, West Sussex, United Kingdom	US$4,406,693	$5,986,000		
August 19, 2022	1985	Ferrari 288 GTO	ZFFPA16B000058335	RM Sotheby's	Monterey, California, United States	US$4,405,000	$4,846,301		
August 13, 2021	1958	Ferrari 250 GT Series I Cabriolet	1075 GT	Gooding & Company	Pebble Beach, California, United States	US$4,405,000	$5,233,744		
August 15, 2025	1935	Duesenberg Model J Torpedo Phaeton	2583	RM Sotheby's	Monterey, California, United States	US$4,405,000	$4,521,000		
March 9, 2012	1973	Porsche 917/30	917/30 004	Gooding & Co.	Amelia Island, Florida, United States	US$4,400,000	$6,170,000		
March 12, 2016	1962	Ferrari 400 Superamerica LWB Coupé Aerodinamico	3949 SA	RM Sotheby's	Amelia Island, Florida, United States	US$4,400,000	$5,903,000		
January 31, 2023	2003	Ferrari Enzo	128786	RM Sotheby's	Paris, France	US$4,392,781.5	$4,392,781.5		
January 21, 2006	1950	GM Futurliner	011	Barrett-Jackson	Scottsdale, Arizona, United States	US$4,320,000	$6,899,000	(Note: A record for a General Motors vehicle.)	
August 19, 2022	1959	Porsche 718 RSK Werks Spyder	718-006	RM Sotheby's	Monterey, California, United States	US$4,300,000	$4,730,782		
March 4, 2023	1931	Duesenberg Model J 'Disappearing Top' Convertible Coupe		RM Sotheby's	Amelia Island, Florida, United States	US$4,295,000	$4,295,000		
August 16, 2025	1989	RUF CTR1 'Yellowbird' Lightweight	W09BT0343KPR06009	RM Sotheby's	Monterey, California, United States	US$4,295,000	$4,408,000		
March 12, 2011	1952	Ferrari 340 Mexico	0224AT	RM Auctions	Amelia Island, Florida, United States	US$4,290,000	$6,140,000		
August 16, 2025	1933	Alfa Romeo 8C 2300 Torpédo	2311207	Gooding Christie's	Pebble Beach, United States	US$4,250,000	$4,362,000		
December 1, 2013	1956	Jaguar D-Type 'Shortnose'	XKD 561	Bonhams	London, United Kingdom	US$4,241,491	$5,862,000		
May 15, 2004	1935	Duesenberg SJ Speedster "Mormon Meteor"	N/A	Gooding & Company	Pebble Beach, California, United States	US$4,455,000	$7,594,000		
February 7, 2009	1937	Bugatti Type 57S Atalante	57502	Bonhams	Paris, France	US$4,408,575	$6,616,000		
August 19, 2022	1969	Porsche 908/02	908/02-010	Gooding & Company	Pebble Beach, California, United States	US$4,185,000	$4,604,261		
February 8, 2017	1934	Alfa Romeo P3	50006	RM Sotheby's	Paris, France	US$4,180,680	$5,491,186		
August 16, 2009	1933	Alfa Romeo 8C 2300 Castagna Drop Head Coupe	2311214	Gooding & Company	Pebble Beach, California, United States	US$4,180,000	$6,273,000		
May 2, 2015	1934	Packard Twelve Individual Custom Stationary Coupe	901968	RM Auctions	Fort Worth, Texas, United States	US$4,180,000	$5,678,000	(Note: A record for a Packard.)	
August 19, 2022	2004	Ferrari Enzo	ZFFCZ56B000136089	Gooding & Company	Pebble Beach, California, United States	US$4,130,000	$4,543,751		
February 7, 2018	2017	Bugatti Chiron	042	RM Sotheby's	Paris, France	US$4,088,212	$5,241,645		
August 28, 1999	1937	Alfa Romeo 8C 2900B Pinin Farina Cabriolet	412012	Christie's	Monterey, California, United States	US$4,072,500	$7,871,000		
August 16, 2013	1955	Ferrari 750 Monza	0530M	RM Auctions	Monterey, California, United States	US$4,070,000	$5,625,000		
January 17, 2015	1962	Ferrari 400 Superamerica Series I Coupé Aerodinamico	3221SA	Gooding & Company	Scottsdale, Arizona, United States	US$4,070,000	$5,528,000		
January 20, 2018	1931	Bugatti Type 55 Roadster	55201	Gooding & Company	Scottsdale, Arizona, United States	US$4,070,000	$5,218,000		
September 9, 2017	1955	Ferrari 750 Monza	0534M	RM Sotheby's	Maranello, Emilia-Romagna, Italy	US$4,059,000	$5,331,000		
October 29, 2008	1997	McLaren F1	065	RM Auctions	London, United Kingdom	US$4,058,120	$6,068,000		
August 15, 2015	1931	Bentley 4½-Litre Supercharged Torpedo	MS3929	RM Auctions	Monterey, California, United States	US$4,015,000	$5,453,000		
August 17, 2014	1939	Alfa Romeo Tipo 256 Cabriolet Sportivo	915026	Gooding & Company	Pebble Beach, California, United States	US$4,000,000	$5,440,000		
August 19, 2016	1931	Bugatti Type 51	51121	Bonhams	Carmel, California, United States	US$4,000,000	$5,366,057		

== Common contributing factors ==
Common contributing factors affecting the value of auctioned automobiles include:

- Low production volumes and rarity (limited supply)
- Desirability (increased demand)
- Aesthetic design, even of its time
- Nostalgia – is known as the generation effect; collectors in their prime earning years, able to afford a seven figure car, are likely to buy cars that they are born to identify themselves with.
- Sport cars are typically more expensive than comparable engined sedans (also known as saloons), therefore more desirable. The same applies to roadsters over sedans. Luxury cars, however, because of their higher price tag, are on a higher end of the scale.
- Condition, also complete documentation (such as evidence of its restoration) of the car is vital for its value. It is not unusual for these cars to have undergone restoration work in the past costing hundreds of thousands, if not millions, of dollars.
- Winning a prestigious auto show helps the car's value. This was the case for some of the cars listed below that have been cited to have taken overall or class wins at the Pebble Beach Concours d'Elegance.
- Originality, typically a car that had its original mechanical components, as it was when it left the factory, is more desirable to the one that doesn't. Original bodyshell retains the value better to one fitted with a new body but the chassis of the car is more considered by collectors.
- Cars equipped with automatic transmission are considered to be less desirable than its manual counterpart.
- Cars that have been freshly restored or hidden away for a number of years or decades makes the car desirable to a show winner or a famous car.
- Eligibility to vintage events is a factor to prices as collectors typically buy vintage race cars to enter historic events as are cars that can be designed to be driven on the street but are competitive on the track.
- The originality of the car is considered important in historic racing due to the Historic Technical Passports and FIA Heritage Certificates in force, meaning cars must retain mechanical systems that belonged to the car of the period to prevent unfair advantages.
- Cars with a strong motorsport history improve on the car's desirability, better if the car have won a prestigious race such as the 24 Hours of Le Mans, the Formula One World Championship and the Indianapolis 500. An example would be the Ferrari 330 TRI/LM Spider that was sold for $9.25 million in 2007, which was the 1962 winner of the 24 hours classic. Note that sportscar racers makes up the majority of competition cars on the main list.
- A car associated with a famous person adds value to its price. Examples are:
  - Elton John in 2001 auctioned his large collection, as a result of his fame, a majority of those sold at twice their appraised sale-price estimates.
  - In 2008, TV presenter and radio personality Chris Evans broke a twenty-one-year-old record, when he successfully placed a bid for a Ferrari 250 GT SWB California Spider that once belonged to James Coburn.
  - In 1973 a Mercedes-Benz 770 F-Cabriolet that stated to be the parade limousine of Adolf Hitler was sold for a then record of US$153,000 (equivalent to $1,110,000 in 2025), surpassing the previous record held by a Duesenberg Model J Victoria that belonged to Greta Garbo at US$90,000 (equivalent to $693,000 in 2025). A week after the auction it was revealed to be the limousine of the President of Finland Carl Gustaf Mannerheim (not Hitler). The same Mercedes went on to surpass its own record months later despite this error in its historical prominence.
  - On the other hand, a car belonging to a celebrity who is implicated in a credibility damaging scandal is likely to be worth less. An example of this is the Rolls-Royce Corniche belonging to British TV and radio personality, Jimmy Savile; in light of his sexual abuse scandal following his death, the car is speculated by the motoring trade to be worthless. However, the white 1993 Ford Bronco, that was involved in the chase between O. J. Simpson and LAPD, was sold for $75,000 in 2004, almost twice its original value, ten years after the incident.
- On the other hand, as above, a car that is associated with a famous otherwise factory-backed racing team, such as Scuderia Ferrari, which was the case in August 2011 when one of their factory Ferrari 250 Testa Rossa broke a new record, surpassing the record held by another car of the same model two years before, which was a customer car.
- Auctions taking place during the annual Monterey Historics events every mid-August are generally expected to bring in record sale prices as they are considered to be the hotpoint for collectors and investors who prefer to attend the events, awaiting the outcome. In general, however, auctions are not likely to result in statistically significant price increases when compared to publicly available private sale records of the same model in equivalent condition.

=== World economy affecting car values ===
Aside those mentioned above, the world economy is the other main factor to the value of collectible cars as classic cars are frequently regarded as an alternative investment.

The market began in the 1970s when used Ferraris were exported to Italian exotic car dealers in the United States who were willing to buy every vehicle which they were offered. During the 1973 oil crisis (when prices of exotic cars plummeted rapidly), almost new and top-of-range models frequented in used car lots, a Lamborghini Miura could be bought for $15,000 at the time. A 1960 Ferrari 250 GT SWB California Spider that went on to sell for $4,950,000 in 2009 was offered for sale in the June 1964 issue of Road & Track for US$10,500 (equivalent to $109,000 in 2025), in the April 1976 issue of Hemmings Motor News, the same car was offered at US$16,750 (equivalent to $95,000 in 2025). After a period of ups and downs in the 1970s and early 1980s, interest rates eased, meaning highly desirable exotic cars whose decals once frequented bedroom walls of collectible car fans suddenly became affordable.

During the 1980s boom, investors frequented auctions, causing prices to skyrocket. When cars were sold, they were commonly shifted to storage for investors intending to eventually profit on their accrued collectors value. The high prices drove enthusiasts away from the market, and cars passed from investor to investor with little or no profit gained. The 1980s boom was followed by 1990s bust, and the values of classic cars plummeted, causing most owners to lose considerable portions of their investment portfolio values.

According to the November 1997 issue of Car Magazine, the Ferrari F40 was credited for sparking the price speculation craze.

During the height of the Japanese asset price bubble in the late 1980s, when the yen had strengthened from an exchange rate of about 300 yen per one U.S. dollar in 1985 to about 150 yen per U.S. dollar in 1989, wealthy Japanese buyers began to buy classic cars for effectively half the previous cost in yen. One example of this occurred in 1989, a Ferrari 250 GTO (3909GT) was privately sold to Takeo Kato for $13,837,500. When the bubble burst, it was resold to Talacrest, an Egham (in Surrey) based Ferrari dealer for $2.7m in 1994, and was eventually sold again to David Morrison (a London-based American) for an estimated $3.5 million. It was most recently passed on in 2001 to John Mozart, via private sale in exchange for a Ferrari 250 TR, who acquired it for an estimated price of $7,000,000.

Although in general, prices of collectible cars have slightly recessed as a result of the recent recession, prices for most high-end collector cars have held their value or continued to rise. Since the 1990s recession, values of the most desirable cars have risen by at least 200%. This changing trend in value fluctuation can be attributed to most investors thoroughly researching the cars they are interested prior to purchase, in contrast to the short-sighted, spontaneous purchases which destabilized the collectible car market during the 1980s.

Between 2005 and 2010, the value of vintage cars have increased by an average of 21%, according to Dietrich Hatlapa of the HAGI Index (Historic Automobile Group International).

One of the largest challenges faced by those who invest in collectible cars is the risk of immediate devaluation following an automobile accident which causes physical damage to the vehicle. The most expensive car crash in recorded motoring history was caused by American businessman Christopher Cox, who crashed while driving his Ferrari 250 GTO and completely destroyed its front end. The car itself has an estimated value of approximately $30 million (USD) prior to the incident.
