= Monterey Car Week =

Car show in Monterey, United States

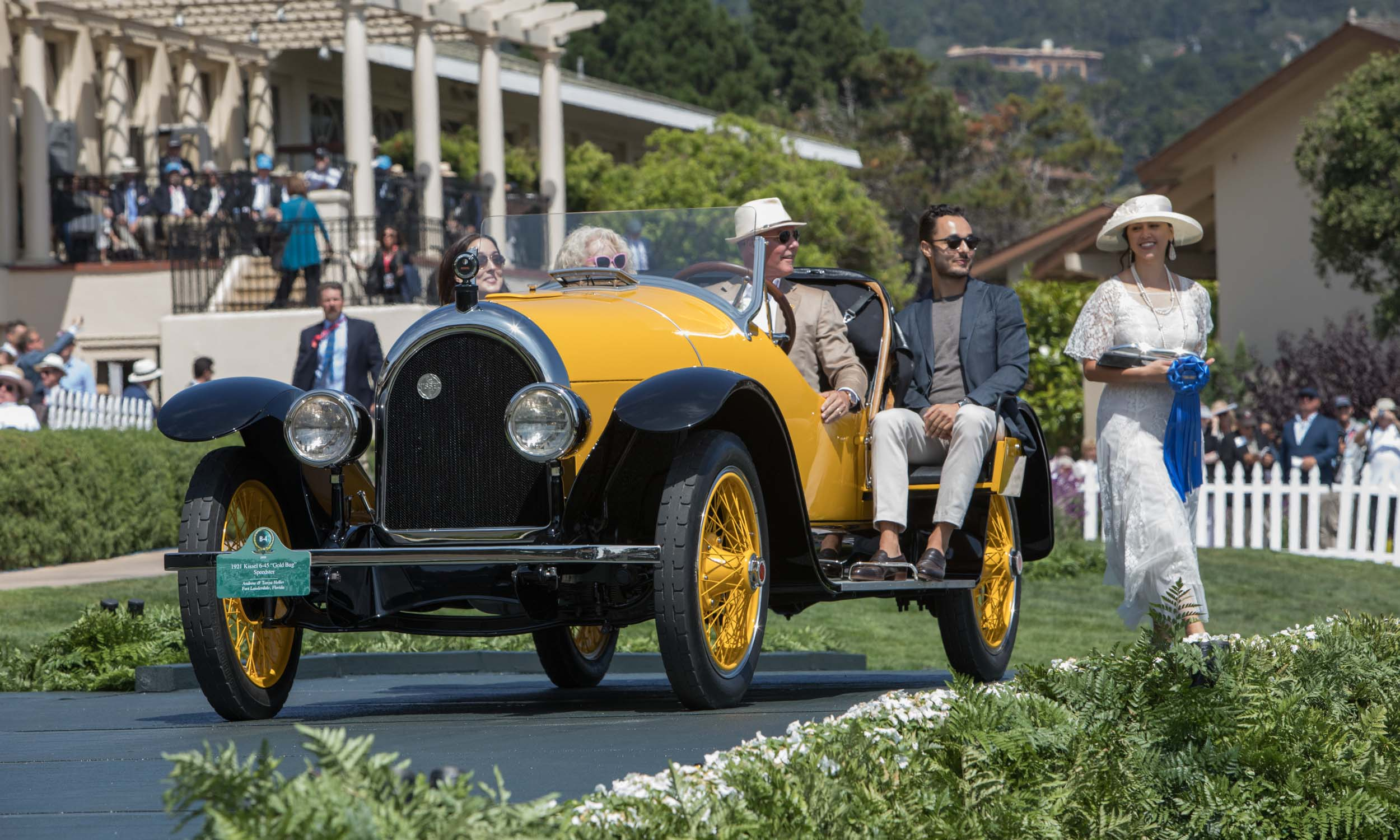
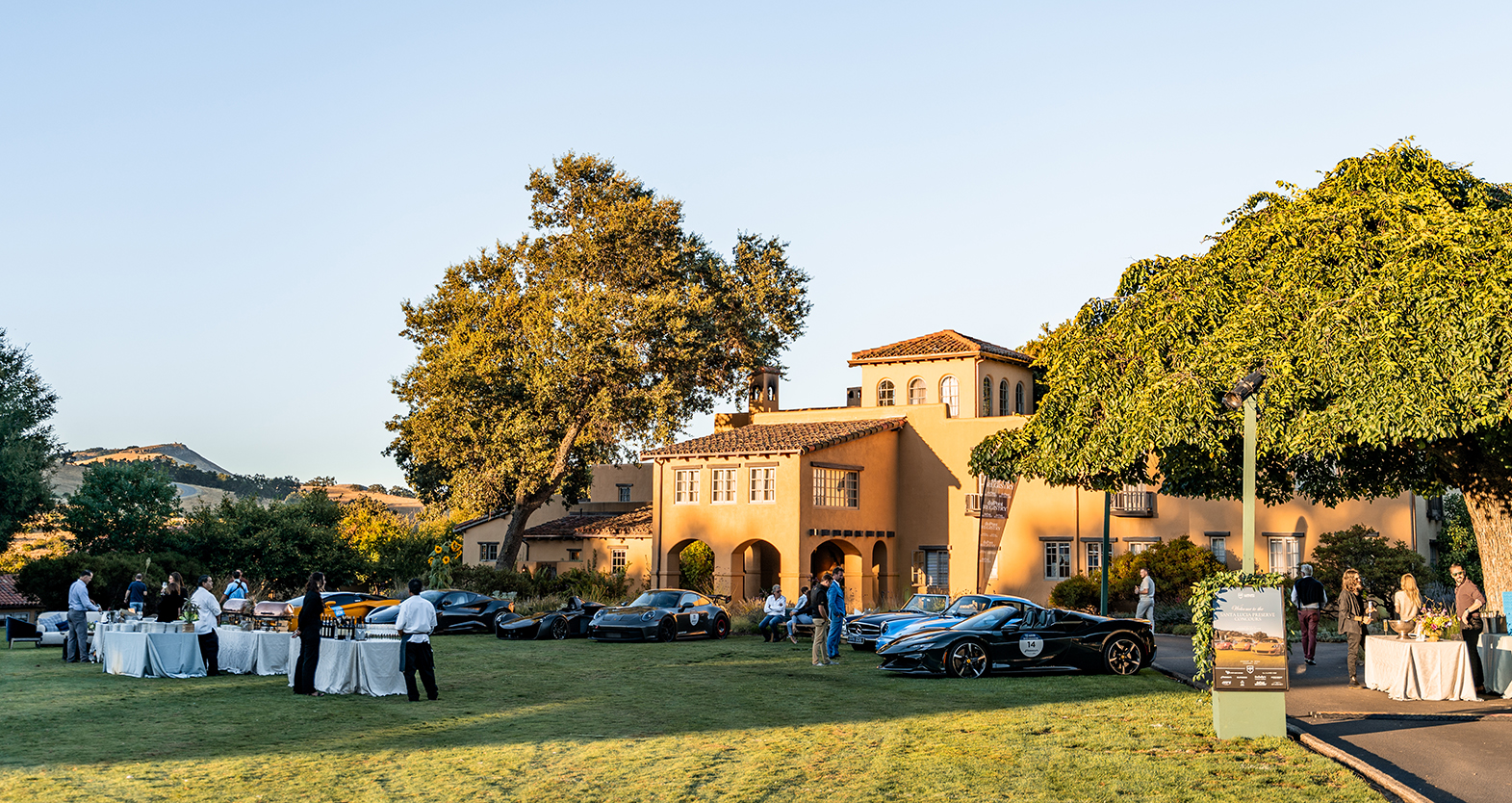
- Top: Pebble Beach Concours d'Elegance. Bottom: Concours & Cocktails at Santa Lucia Preserve.
- Genre: Auto show
- Frequency: Annual, held in August
- Locations: Monterey Peninsula, California, United States
- Country: United States
- Inaugurated: August 1950 (76 years ago)
- Attendance: >100,000 (2024)
- Website: www.seemonterey.com/carweek

Monterey Car Week is a series of car-related events held annually every August in and around the Monterey Peninsula in California, United States. It is globally recognized as one of the premier gatherings for auto enthusiasts, with auctions, rallies, races, competitions, and car shows all culminating in the Pebble Beach Concours d'Elegance on Sunday.

The tradition first began in 1950 as an outgrowth of the Pebble Beach Road Race. In the decades since, increasing official and unofficial car events sprang up, drawing an estimated 100,000 attendees in 2024, and hundreds of millions in auction sales.

== Highlight Events ==
=== Pebble Beach Concours d'Elegance ===
The Pebble Beach Concours d'Elegance is held on the final Sunday of Monterey Car Week, and is the marquee event of the week. The proceeds of the show support various charities.

=== Rolex Monterey Motorsports Reunion ===
The Rolex Monterey Motorsports Reunion, formerly known as the Monterey Historics until 2010, is held the final weekend of Monterey Car Week at WeatherTech Raceway Laguna Seca. The four-day event has over 500 participants, and generally features a specific marque every year. The Monterey Pre-Reunion is a two-day event held the previous Saturday and Sunday.

=== Motorlux (Jet Center Party) ===
The Motorlux, formerly known as the Jet Center Party or Motorworks Revival until 2022 (hosted by Gordon McCall), is an invitation-only event held at the Monterey Jet Center the Wednesday before the Pebble Beach Concours. It is considered the unofficial kick-off for the week. It is hosted by Hagerty. Both exotic cars and private jets are displayed.

=== Legends of the Autobahn ===
The Legends of the Autobahn Show features German automobiles. It began as a BMW Car Club of America event and grew to include all German cars. It formerly showed Porsches also, but a separate event, the Porsche Werks Reunion, for Porsches was established in 2014. This event is free to the public. It is held at the Pacific Grove Golf Links

=== Porsche Werks Reunion ===
The Porsche Werks Reunion event features Porsches of all years, models, and variations and was established in 2014 after splitting off from the Legends of the Autobahn show. There were 519 cars on display at the initial event. This event was started by the Porsche Club of America. It was previously held at the now-closed Rancho Cañada Golf Club in Carmel, moving locations to Corral de Tierra Country Club, and now held at the Monterey Pines Golf Course. The event welcomes all Porsche clubs, owners, and enthusiasts.

=== The Quail, A Motorsports Gathering ===
The Quail, A Motorsports Gathering (usually shortened to The Quail) is a car show limited to 200 automobiles located at the Quail Lodge & Golf Club. A maximum 3,000 tickets are sold to this event to avoid crowding. Judging includes a Best of Show award, which qualifies the winning vehicle to participate in the Peninsula “Best of the Best” competition which pits the eight best of show cars from eight different premier automobile concours from around the world in one event which takes place in Paris, France.

=== Concours & Cocktails ===
Hosted annually since 2000 at the private Santa Lucia Preserve, Concours & Cocktails is an invite-only event held on the grounds of a 1920s hacienda, featuring as many as 100 cars from the collections of club members and special guests, some of which will feature at the Pebble Beach Concours on Sunday.

=== Concorso Italiano ===
The Concorso Italiano features Italian cars. It is held at the golf course at the Bayonet & Blackhorse Golf Club.

=== Exotics on Broadway ===
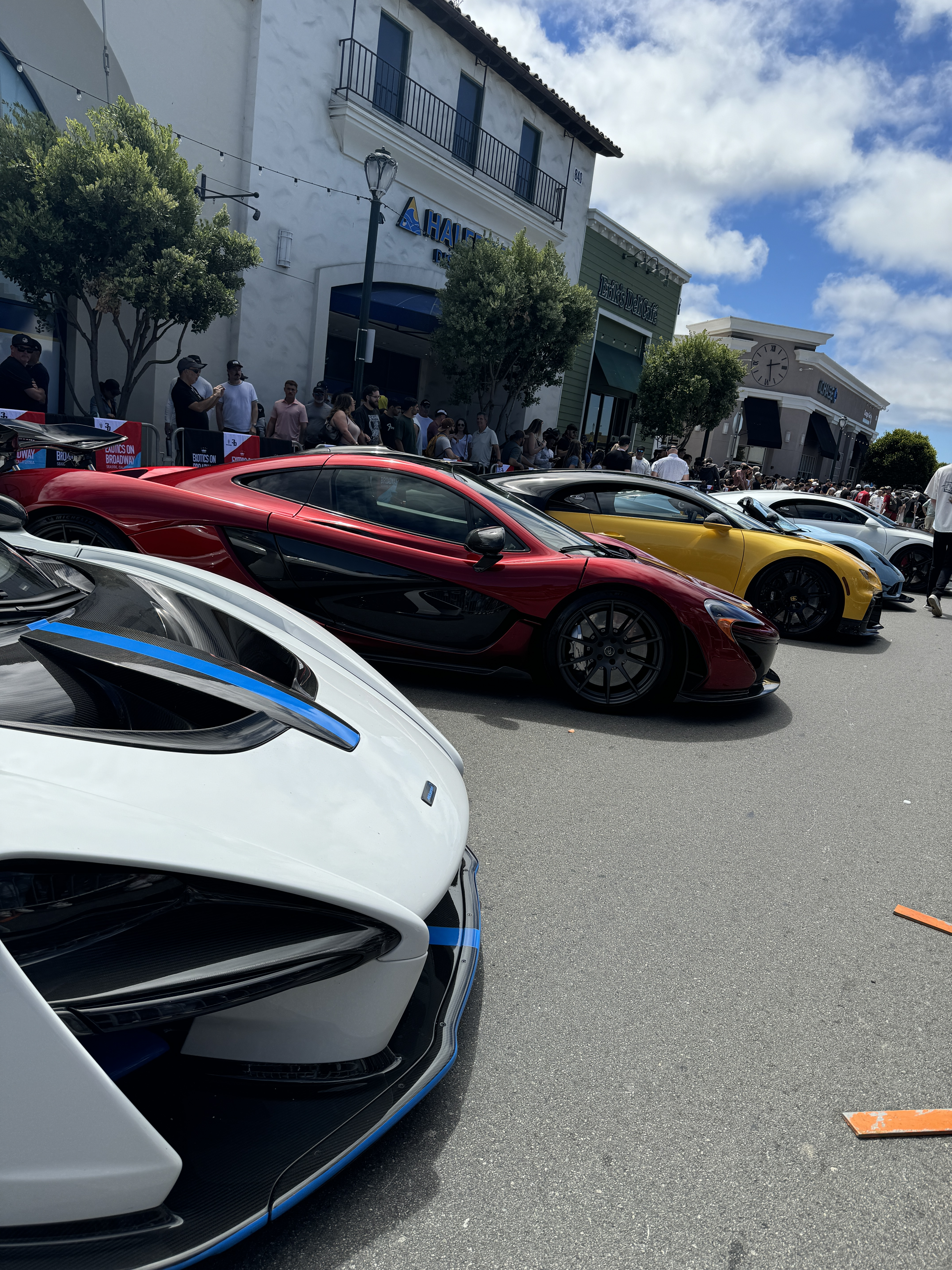
Exotics on Broadway 2024

Exotics on Broadway is a free public car show held in downtown Seaside, California during Monterey Car Week. The event includes supercars, hypercars, and modified exotic automobiles lined along Broadway Avenue and has entertained crowds since its debut in 2015. Its open access format has made it one of the most heavily attended gathering of the week, attracting large crowds each year. Automotive media have described the event as combining the atmosphere of a street festival with a showcase of high end and modified cars. In a 2019 feature, Hagerty characterized Exotics on Broadway as “a mishmash of modded metal and exuberant enthusiasts,” emphasizing the diversity of cars and personalities it brings together.

== Auctions ==
Automobile auctions of classic cars are held at various times and locations on the Monterey Peninsula. They are held by auction houses such as Bonhams, Broad Arrow by Hagerty, GoodingChristie's, Mecum, and RM Sotheby's. Total sales in 2014 were $463,744,226, with the high sale being a 1962 Ferrari 250 GTO berlinetta for $38,115,000.
