= Bugatti Type 57S Atalante (57502) =

Auction car

1937 Bugatti Type 57S number 57502 pictured in the garage where it was discovered (undated photograph released by Bonhams)

The Bugatti Type 57S Atalante number 57502, built in 1937 by Automobiles Ettore Bugatti, is one of 43 Bugatti Type 57S made and one of only 17 Type 57S produced with the in-house Atalante coupé coachwork. The car hit the headlines in 2009 when auctioned by Bonhams, after having been rediscovered in 2008, following 48 years of storage in a private owner's garage in Gosforth, England, with few people aware of its location.

== History ==
Chassis number 57502 was completed at the Bugatti works on 5 May 1937, with the works number plate 1127-W5; it then wore the British number plate DYK 5, finally being re-registered as EWS 73, the number which it wore on rediscovery. The car was ordered new from the factory by Francis Curzon, 5th Earl Howe (1884–1964), a keen motor racing enthusiast, who took delivery of it on 9 June 1937 from Sorel of London, the UK agents for Bugatti. 57502 then passed through three intermediate owners before being bought in 1955 by Dr. Harold Carr (1917–2007), from Newcastle upon Tyne. Passionate for machinery, aviation and adventuring, Carr suffered from obsessive compulsive disorder, which in his later life caused him to become a recluse and a hoarder. In December 1960, after its last tax disc expired, Carr stored the Bugatti along with other classic cars in a lock-up garage in Gosforth, Newcastle upon Tyne. There it remained unused and untouched until after Carr's death, when it was discovered by Carr's nephew clearing the garage of his uncle's possessions in 2008. 57502 still possessed its original chassis, engine, drive train and body, though it did contain some modifications: bespoke bumpers, rear-view mirrors on the A-pillars, and a luggage rack dating from the Earl Howe ownership, as well as a Marshall K200 supercharger fitted by a later owner. According to the nephew, notes found in the garage showed that some people had previously inquired about the car, and attempted to buy it from Carr. Other family members had known of the Bugatti and other cars in Dr. Carr's possession, but weren't aware of the car's true value.

Auction house Bonhams, instructed to sell the car by the eight Carr heirs, made it the centrepiece of their February 2009 sale at the Rétromobile car show in Paris. Due to its rarity, low mileage and original condition, it was speculated that it could become one of the most expensive (nominal) cars ever sold at auction, at around £6 million. However, it fell short of the £3 million reserve price, selling for £2,989,495 (3,417,500 euros, US$4,408,575). The car was restored, then sold for £7,855,000 ($10,433,965), at the Gooding & Co. ("Passion of a Lifetime") on 5 September 2020, making it the most expensive Type 57 ever sold at auction – but by no means the most expensive Type 57 ever sold. Just a year later No. 57374 was sold to a private buyer for $30 million.
