= Greenwich Concours d'Elégance =

Annual vintage cars event

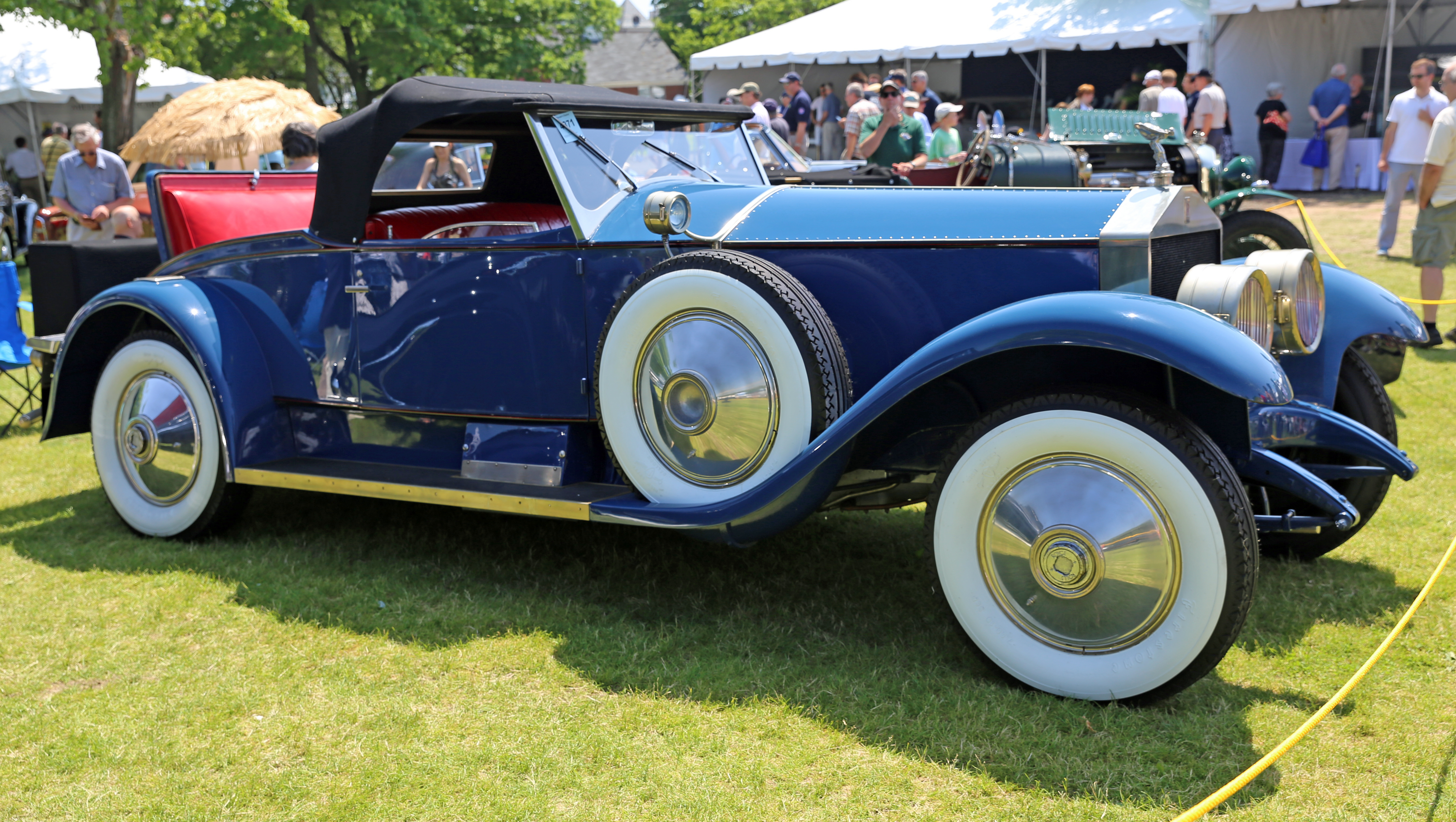
A 1926 Rolls-Royce Silver Ghost "Playboy" Roadster at the 2013 Greenwich Concours d'Elegance

The Greenwich Concours d'Elegance is an annual event in June that has been held since 1996 in Greenwich, Connecticut. The event is a Concours d'Elegance that features classic American and European vintage cars that are entered in a judging competition. The event includes classic car parades over 3 days. The event often includes American muscle cars, very early American cars, luxury cars of all years, and rare European cars.

Collectible car insurance company Hagerty became the organizer in 2019.

== Auction ==
There is a Bonham's auction on the last day. Rare cars have recently been auctioned there for over $1,000,000. In 2014, a Lamborghini Countach sold for the most ever at auction - $1,200,000. In 2015, the high auction prices were a Bugatti Type 57S Stelvio Convertible for $1,000,000, a 1938 Mercedes-Benz 320 for $775,000 and a Porsche 911RS 2.7 for $594,000. For the 2016 auction, there was a 1967 Ferrari 275 ($3M value), a 1937 Mercedes-Benz 540K, and a Ferrari F40 ($1M value). The auction also includes barn finds, veteran cars, and antique cars.
