= Napoleon Motors Company =

Defunct American motor vehicle manufacturer

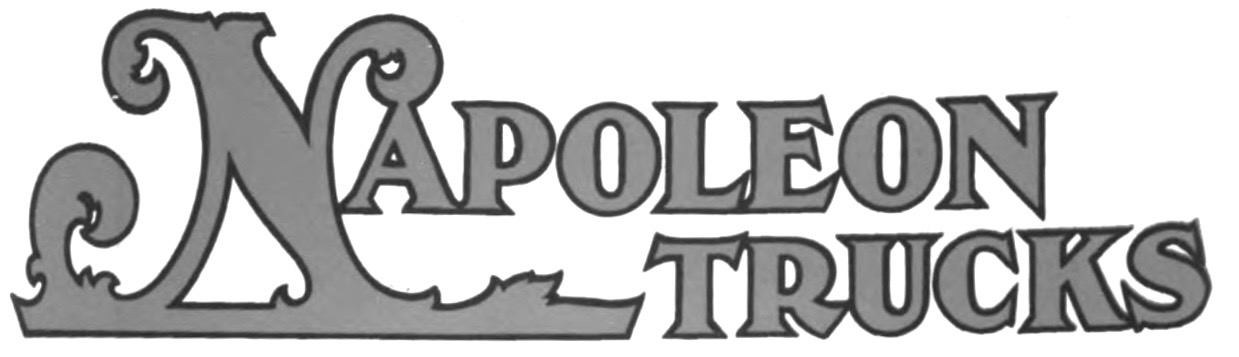
- Formerly: Traverse City Motor Car Company
- Type: Truck Company
- Industry: Manufacturing
- Founded: 1916; 110 years ago
- Founder: A. O. George, F. N. McGrewie, G. W. Russell
- Defunct: 1923; 103 years ago
- Headquarters: Traverse City, Michigan, US
- Products: Trucks , Cars

The Napoleon Motors Company of Traverse City, Michigan, was a truck and car manufacturer.

== History ==
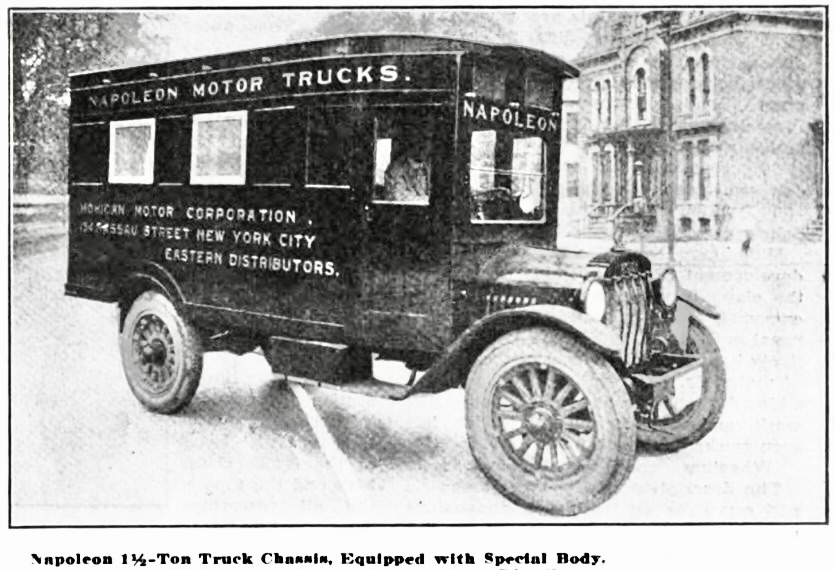
Napoleon Model 11 (1919-1923)

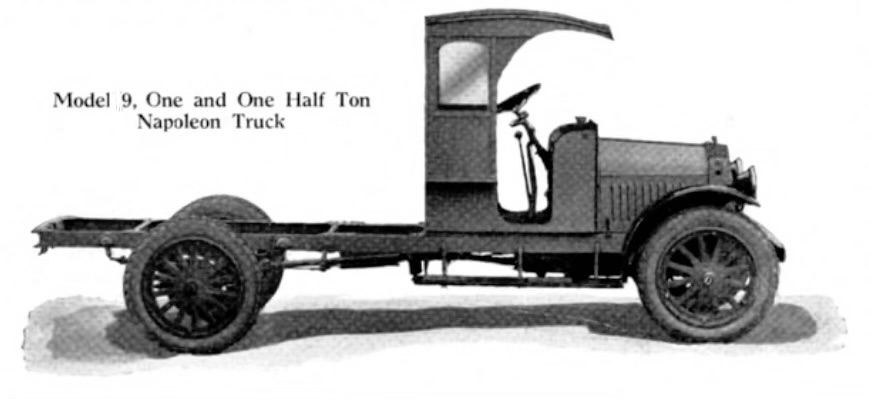
Napoleon Model 9 (1919-1923) 1 to

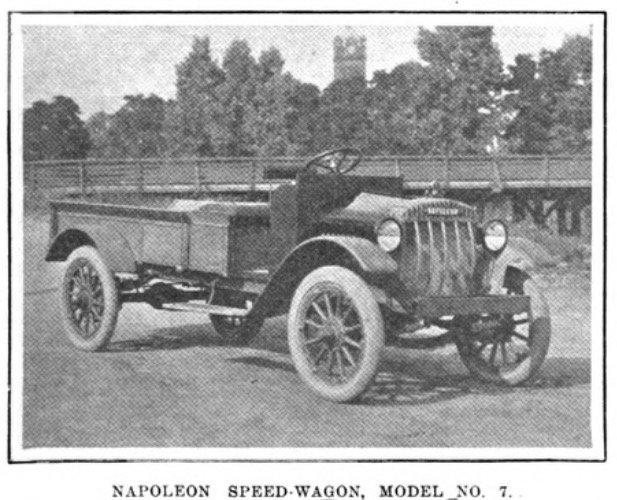
Napoleon Model 7 Speed Wagon (1920-1923) 0,75 to

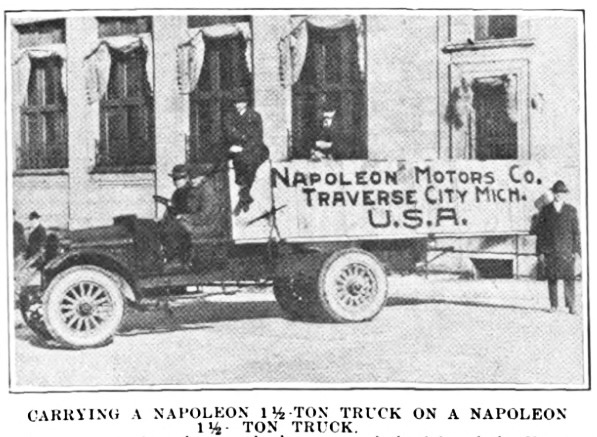
Napoleon truck sent to England (1919)

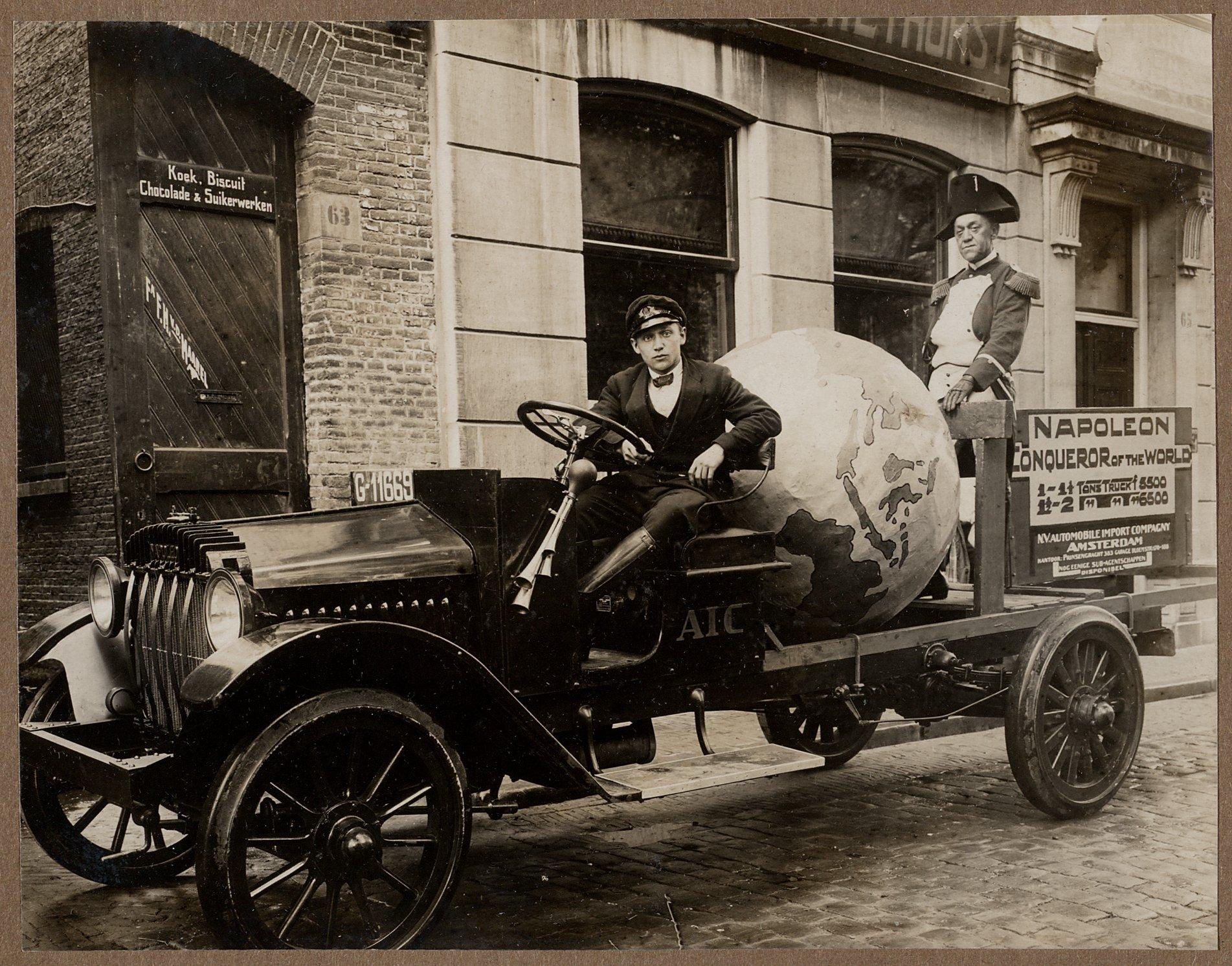
Napoleon Model 9 or Model 11

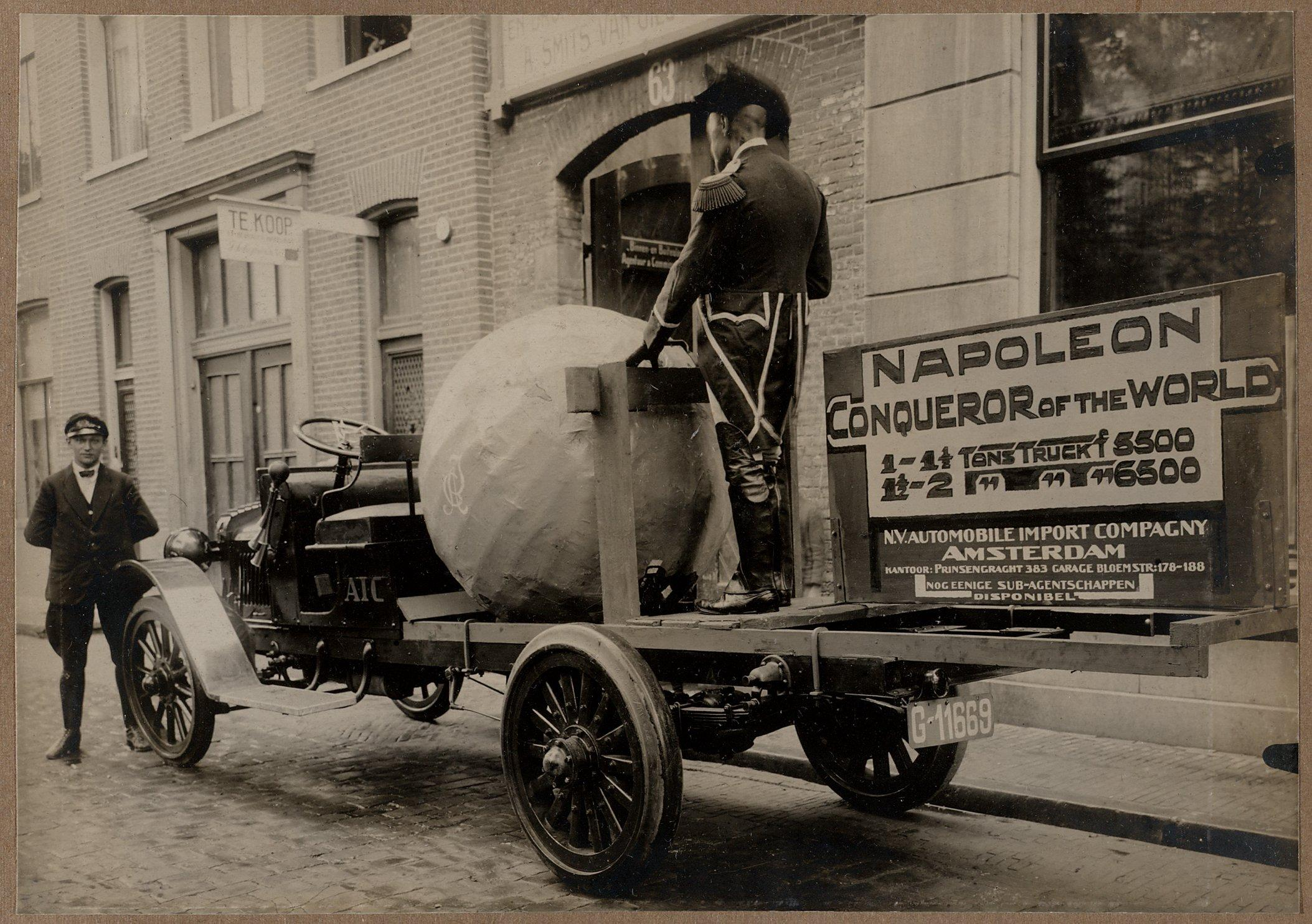
Napoleon Model 9 or Model 11 in Amsterdam

The company was founded in March of 1916 in Napoleon, Ohio , USA. A. O. George, formerly chief engineer at the Fostoria Light Car Company, F. N. McGrewie from the Auburn Automobile Company, and G. W. Russell founded the Napoleon Motor Car Company. The company was able to use the premises of the old Morningstar Threshing Machine Company building to produce both a five-seater and a seven-seater touring car with the model designation 30. The company needed a bigger factory because of demand and got the chance to move to Traverse City, where they could meet production needs. In Traverse, the former building of W.E. Williams Flooring Company could be used. The agreement with the city included $75,000 in operating capital and three years of rent-free use. But only Napoleon's car business would move, and the company was renamed Traverse City Motor Car Company. The truck business stayed at the old location and became Reya, which only survived a few years. In 1918, the company changed its name again to Napoleon Motors Company and on December 1, 1919, stopped making cars to focus only on trucks. The engines came from Gray Victory. In 1920, there were rising orders and production, as well as an expansion of sales into other states and countries. Napoleon Trucks are shipped to England, Scotland, Holland, Spain, India, Cape Town, South Africa, Philippine, Japan, Columbia, South America, Norway, Ireland and Belgium. The brand name still comes from the time of the first location in Napoleon, Ohio. The City of Napoleon was founded in 1832 and named after the French emperor Napoleon Bonaparte. Production flourished until 1920, but by mid-1921 orders were declining due to the large number of trucks on the market, which were produced for the war effort and were now cheaply placed in private hands. in September 1922, Napoleon filed for bankruptcy and thus joined other failed car and truck manufacturers in Michigan and throughout the USA.

A Napoleon truck has survived. It belongs to the Hagerty Insurance Company, where it is occasionally displayed.

== Production models ==
The pre-assigned serial numbers only indicate the maximum possible production quantity.

Year	Production figures	Model	Load capacity	Serial number
1916	2 daily	25 hp		
1917		30		
1918		4-37, 6-45		
1919		4-37, 6-45		
	30	9	1 to	584 to 613
	↑	11	1,5 to	583 to 612
1920		7	0,75 to	
	429	9	1 to	618 to 1046
	↑	11	1,5 to	618 to 1046
1921		11, 9 , 7	1,5 to, 1 to, 0,75 to	1047 to
1922		11, 9 , 7	1,5 to, 1 to, 0,75 to	566 to
1923		11, 9 , 7	1,5 to, 1 to, 0,75 to	
