= Buckmobile =

Defunct American motor vehicle manufacturer

Buckmobile Company
- Company type: Automobile Manufacturing
- Industry: Automotive
- Founded: 1902
- Defunct: 1905
- Fate: Merged with Black Diamond Automobile Company; merged company declared bankrupt and assets sold at auction
- Headquarters: Utica, New York, United States
- Area served: United States
- Products: Vehicles; Automotive parts

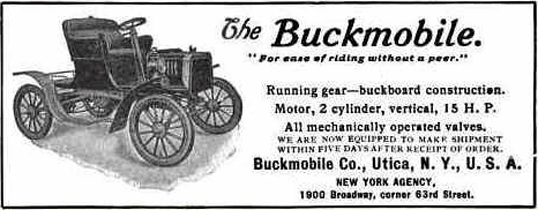
Buckmobile Company of Utica, New York - 1903

The Buckmobile was an American automobile manufactured between 1902 and 1905 in Utica, New York, by the Buckmobile Company. A prototype was created in 1901 before the company was incorporated. The company added extensions to their factory to increase production, but this dealt a crippling financial blow to the company. In October 1904 the firm was merged with the Black Diamond Automobile Company, but by July 1905 production had finished. The business was sold in a sheriff's sale shortly after, with total Buckmobile production estimated at 40 cars.

== History ==
The Buckmobile Company was formed on May 31, 1902. The company would be formed out of a previous company named the Utica Automobile Co. headed by A.J. Seaton and W. H. Birdsall. Seaton would be the president of the new firm and Birdsall would be the manager and superintendent. Buckmobile would acquire a factory to make the car with the capacity to make 10 cars a day with most cars being slated for "western territory" (understood to mean anything west of Ohio). The company would source the bodies for the car from Willoughby Owen Co which had a plant in Utica.

By mid 1903 Buckmobile had 15 employees. The company hoped to have a production rate of 1 car per day by August.

=== Merger With Black Diamond Automobile Company ===
In 1903 the Black Diamond Automobile Company would be formed in Geneva New York for the purpose of manufacturing automobiles. The president was D. W. Hallenback. The company would be capitalized at $500,000. The car was described as having a very unusual means of propulsion, an engine would be provided by an inventor named William Dieter who would serve as the superintendent. the engine was capable of being run either on gasoline as an internal combustion engine or as a steam engine and the combination made 10HP. The car could be powered at any given point by steam or gas or both.

In June of 1904 it was announced that Black Diamond would acquire Buckmobile. Production of the Buckmobile would continue largely unchanged and the brand would continue to be used, and it seems that the proposed Black Diamond branded car never made it to production. Reasons for this failure to bring the car to market could be from an overly complicated engine layout, a lack of capital, or a general shift away from steam cars by the overall market. Announced at the same time was the purchase of a factory that belonged to a recently defunct Remington Motor Vehicle Company, which also operated out of Utica. The Potter Wheel Works of Utica was a part of the corporate merger as well. William Dieter would remain as head engineer and may have possibly been working in a general manager role in addition.

In August of 1905 a judge would declare Black Diamond to be bankrupt on a $15,000 bond. A sheriff levied the factory of the company to satisfy debts of $11,000.

=== Clark V. Buckmobile ===
A case was brought against Buckmobile (and presumably Black Diamond) arguing that Buckmobile was liable for damgaes that occurred while an employee was driving the car.

Arthur Davis was ordered by his boss (William Birdsall) to come pick him up at the train station after Birdsall had been running errands all day. When driving to pick up Birdsall; Davis would get into a car accident. The plaintiff would then make the case that Buckmobile was liable for the damages. The court decided that neither Birdsall or Buckmobile was liable for damages caused by David who was acting as a personal chauffeur who was not driving for official company purposes.

== Models ==
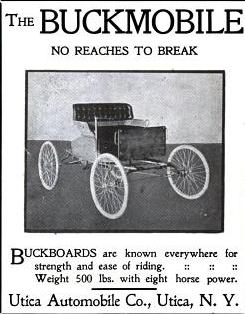
1902 Buckmobile Ad

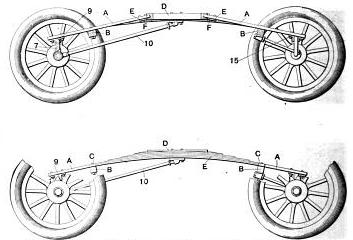
Buckmobile Suspension Ca. 1904

A novel feature of the Buckmobile was the suspension that was made up of two spring that ran the entire length of the car and formed an arch at the midpoint. The suspension was made from a combination of metal and wood. The purpose of the novel approach was to minimize the amount of shock carried from the road to the body and components.

The engine was placed under the drivers seat like many early runabouts, despite the appearance of a hood on later models; there is no engine where one would expect there to be.

=== 1902 ===
The first car was advertised to the public in early 1902. The car was extremely simple, surviving photos show no lights or top. The car had a simple flat dashboard and wire wheels. The car weighed 500 pounds. Steering was right hand drive by use of a tiller.

=== 1903 ===
By 1903 the dashboard and body would undergo significant aesthetic changes, the dashboard would become rounder, the rear of the body would incorporate a sweeping element and the wire wheels would be replaced by wood wheels. The car now made 10 horsepower from a twin-cylinder engine and was equipped with a planetary transmission that had two forward speeds and a reverse and water cooling. Wheelbase was 80 inches. A speed of 20 miles an hour was said to be easily achievable on main roads. The car would use the advertising slogan "Ease of Riding Without a Peer". Engines and transmissions were sourced and the bodies and suspension were built in-house. For 1903 the car would be priced at $850.

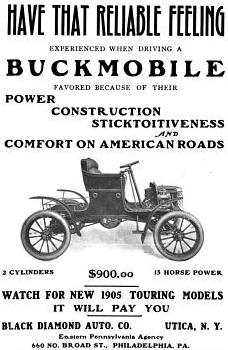
1904 Buckmobile Ad

=== 1904 ===
For either late 1903 or early 1904 the styling would again change. A fake hood would be added that had contained the radiator. A steering wheel would replace the tiller. Kerosene driving lights would be offered and 15 horsepower was now advertised. Prices would rise to $900 by late 1904.

=== Business Wagon ===
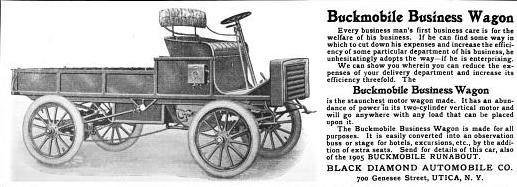
1905 Buckmobile Business Wagon Ad

Buckmobile briefly would manufacture commercial vehicles after their merger with Black Diamond. The vehicle would have an appearance similar to a horse-drawn carriage with the addition of a steering wheel and protruding radiator. It was able to seat two people and was right hand drive, which was still common at the time. The wagon would use the same 15 horsepower motor found in the standard runabouts and was located under the seat. A two speed planetary transmission was provided. Final drive was by chain. A working speed of 12 to 16 miles an hour was advertised. The price for 1905 was $1100.

=== Surviving Cars ===
There are at least two known surviving cars, one was sold at Hershey by RM Sotheby's in 2024 for $38,500 and another possibly modified model exists in Fairbanks Alaska at the Fountainhead Auto Museum

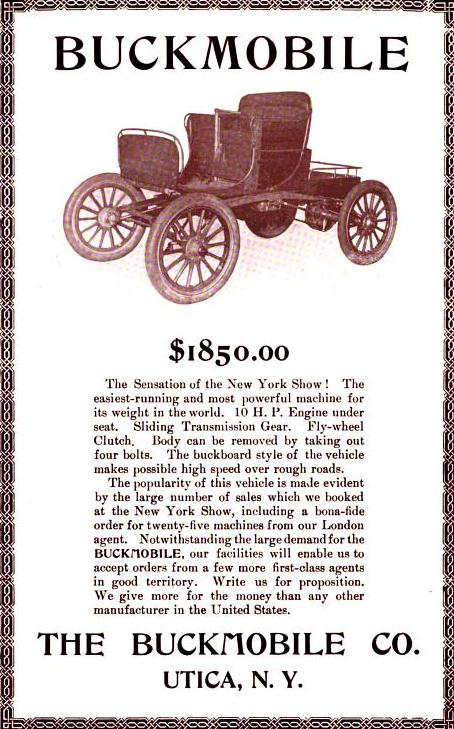
1903 Buckmobile 10Hp Advertisement (the price on this advertisement is incorrect, actual price was $850)
