= Gooding & Company =

American auction house

Gooding & Company, LLC
- Type: Private
- Industry: Auctioneering
- Founded: 2003; 23 years ago in Santa Monica, California, U.S.
- Founder: David Gooding
- Headquarters: Santa Monica, California, U.S.
- Key people: David Gooding (President)
- Products: Automobiles
- Services: Auctioneering, appraisals, private sales, estate planning, financial services
- Parent: Christie's
- Website: goodingco.com

Gooding & Company, LLC is a classic car auction company headquartered in Santa Monica, California. Incorporated in 2003, the company holds multiple all-time records for the most expensive cars sold in auction. The company also provides private treaty sales, estate planning, and appraisals. Since 2004, Gooding & Company has been the official auction house of the Pebble Beach Concours d'Elegance. The global auction house also hosts its London Auction as the official auction partner of the Concours of Elegance at Hampton Court Palace since 2021. Additional auctions are held each year in Amelia Island, Florida. At the present, the auction house holds the world record prices at auction for 12 automotive marques, including Duesenberg, Porsche, Ferrari, Bugatti, McLaren, and RUF.

== History ==
David Gooding began Gooding & Company in 2003, after serving as managing director of the International Motor Sports department at Christie’s and President of RM Auctions. The company held its inaugural sale at Pebble Beach in 2004. Gooding & Company serves as the official auction house of the Pebble Beach Concours d'Elegance; the weekend’s auctions are pivotal to the global collector car market, revealing trends in pricing and taste. Since its inception, the company has broken numerous world records for cars at auction.

British auction house Christie's agreed to acquire Gooding & Company in 2024.

== Notable auctions ==
- To date, Gooding & Company has sold the most expensive car at auction in March 2023 with the sale of its 1962 Ferrari 250 GT SWB California Spider at its Amelia Island Auctions. The California Spider sold for over 18 million dollars.
- After the live auction world's hiatus caused by the COVID-19 pandemic, Gooding & Company made headlines by selling the top two cars at auction in 2021 at its Pebble Beach Auctions: the 1995 McLaren F1, sold for over 20 million dollars, and the 1959 Ferrari 250 GT LWB California Spider Competizione, sold for over 10 million USD.
- On 5 September 2020 a Bugatti T59, built in 1934, was auctioned for a record 8,5 million pound by Gooding & Company. The car had been used by the Bugatti racing team in 1934-1935 and being driven by René Dreyfus it won the Belgian Grand Prix in 1934. It was later rebuilt as a sportscar by Bugatti and sold to King Leopold III of Belgium.
- In August 2018, Gooding & Company set new records for the most expensive Duesenberg, the most expensive prewar car, and the most expensive American car at their Pebble Beach Auctions. The car to establish these new records was the ex-Gary Cooper 1935 Duesenberg SSJ.
- In May 2010, Gooding & Company handled the private sale of a 1936 Bugatti 57SC Atlantic for more than 30 million dollars, at the time the highest price ever paid for a car.
