= Mecum Dealmakers =

- Genre: Reality
- Country of origin: United States
- Original language: English
- No. of seasons: 2
- No. of episodes: 18

Production
- Running time: 60 minutes

Original release
- Network: NBCSN
- Release: July 31, 2014 – September 10, 2015

Mecum Dealmakers is an American reality program airing on NBCSN. The series takes a behind-the-scenes look at Mecum Auctions, America's biggest collectable car auction facility. Each episode features a specific auction, focusing on the unique and collectable automobiles in each auction. The program features Mecum Auctions founder Dana Mecum and son Frank.

== Broadcast ==
The first eleven episode season premiered on July 31, 2014 on NBCSN. The second season of seven episodes premiered on July 30, 2015. The series was rebroadcast on Velocity.

Internationally, the series premiered in Australia on April 2, 2015 on Discovery Turbo.

== Episodes ==
Season	Episodes	Originally released	
Season	Episodes	First released	Last released
1	11	July 31, 2014	December 25, 2014
2	7	July 30, 2015	September 10, 2015

=== Season 1 (2014) ===
No. overall	No. in season	Auction location	Original release date	U.S. viewers
1	1	Houston	July 31, 2014	N/A
2	2	Kansas City	August 7, 2014	N/A
3	3	Indianapolis	August 14, 2014	N/A
4	4	Seattle	August 21, 2014	N/A
5	5	Kissimmee	August 28, 2014	N/A
6	6	Harrisburg	September 4, 2014	N/A
7	7	Monterey	November 27, 2014	N/A
8	8	Dallas	December 4, 2014	N/A
9	9	Chicago	December 11, 2014	N/A
10	10	Anaheim	December 18, 2014	N/A
11	11	Kansas City	December 25, 2014	N/A

=== Season 2 (2015) ===
No. overall	No. in season	Auction location	Original release date	U.S. viewers
12	1	Kissimmee	July 30, 2015	N/A
13	2	Houston	August 6, 2015	N/A
14	3	Indianapolis	August 13, 2015	N/A
15	4	Seattle	August 20, 2015	N/A
16	5	Denver	August 27, 2015	63,000
17	6	Harrisburg	September 3, 2015	N/A
18	7	Monterey	September 10, 2015	N/A
