= McKeel Hagerty =

American entrepreneur and business CEO

- Born: December 9, 1967 (age 58); Traverse City, Michigan, U.S.
- Education: Pepperdine University; Saint Vladimir's Orthodox Theological Seminary; Boston College
- Occupations: CEO, Hagerty

McKeel Hagerty (born December 9, 1967) is an American entrepreneur, business personality and the CEO of Hagerty, an automotive lifestyle brand and specialty collectible insurance company headquartered in Traverse City, Michigan.

== Early life ==
In 1984, Hagerty's parents, Frank and Louise Hagerty, started Hagerty Insurance Agency in Traverse City, Michigan, with a focus on collector wooden boats. That same year, Hagerty finished a three-year restoration of his first car with his father – a 1967 Porsche 911S. Hagerty started the restoration at the age of 13 with $500 in lawn-mowing money that he had saved.

At the age of 18, Hagerty earned his insurance license and was selling marine craft policies. He had not planned on going into the family insurance business, studying philosophy and Russian Orthodox theology in the seminary.

Hagerty holds a BA degree in English and Philosophy from Pepperdine University in 1990, an MA in theology from Saint Vladimir's Orthodox Theological Seminary in 1993 and studied Philosophy and Classics from 1993 to 1995 at Boston College.

In 1995, Hagerty returned to Traverse City to help lead the company with his sisters Kim and Tammy, expanding the company's focus beyond wooden boats and into classic and collector cars Today, the company describes itself as an automotive lifestyle brand offering automotive events, media and membership services in addition to insurance.

== Career ==
In 1995, Hagerty led the company as its vice president of marketing. In 2000, Hagerty became the Co-CEO of Hagerty Insurance Agency and sole CEO in 2012. He was first among classic car insurers to embrace the internet for online quoting and policy management. That same year, he began serving as a judge at the Pebble Beach Concours d'Elegance for the Federation Internationale des Vehicles Anciens (FIVA) preservation class and was the youngest person ever to be asked to serve in such a role.

In an effort to preserve historic vehicles and related artifacts as a lasting record, Hagerty created the Historic Vehicle Association (HVA) in 2009, and in March 2013 the HVA entered into a collaboration with the U.S. Department of the Interior to develop the National Historic Vehicle Register. In 2021, the HVA became part of the newly launched Hagerty Drivers Foundation. Hagerty has served as an advisory board member to the Auto Restoration Program at McPherson College in McPherson College, Kansas, since 1998. He also serves as a board member for the Petersen Automotive Museum in Los Angeles.

Hagerty was presented with the Nicola Bulgari Award from America's Car Museum in 2014 for his outstanding contributions to preserving cars through education, restoration and collecting. In 2023, the Cobra Experience Museum named him as its first “Global Icon Award” winner in recognition of his many contributions to the joys of motoring.

In 2016, Hagerty was elected to serve as global board chairman for Young Presidents' Organization (YPO) – the world’s largest CEO organization with more than 30,000 chief executives in 130 countries whose members run companies that employ 22 million people and generate $10 trillion in annual revenues. Hagerty co-founded venture capital firm Grand Ventures in 2017. As of 2021, Hagerty serves as a special adviser to the fund.

In December 2021, Hagerty, the company, joined the New York Stock Exchange as a publicly traded company with a pro forma enterprise value of approximately $3.1 billion. Hagerty remains the company's CEO.

Under Hagerty, the company began a series of acquisitions to strategically build itself into an automotive lifestyle brand. These acquisitions included DriveShare, a peer to peer collectible vehicle rental marketplace; the Greenwich Concours d'Elegance; the Amelia Island Councours d'Elegance (since renamed The Amelia); the Concours d'Elegance of America (since renamed the Detroit Concours d'Elegance); MotorsportReg.com; Collectors' Car Garage (since renamed Hagerty Garage + Social); the California Mille; Motorlux (formerly known as McCall's Motorworks Revival); and Broad Arrow Group, a live auction company.

In 2022, Hagerty appeared in the video game Gran Turismo 7 as himself, describing classic cars available for the player to purchase.
