= Mecum =

Mecum is a surname. Notable people with the surname include:

- Dudley Mecum (1896–1978), American pianist, vocalist, and songwriter
- Will Mecum, American musician

== See also ==
- Mecum Auctions, a company that specializes in vehicle auctions
