= Hagerty (insurance) =

American classic vehicles insurance company

Hagerty, Inc.
- Company type: Public
- Traded as: NYSE: HGTY
- Industry: Insurance
- Founded: Traverse City, Michigan (1984; 41 years ago)
- Founders: Frank Hagerty; Louise Hagerty
- Headquarters: Traverse City, Michigan, United States
- Area served: Canada; Germany; United Kingdom; United States
- Key people: McKeel Hagerty, CEO
- Website: www.hagerty.com

Hagerty, Inc. is an American automotive lifestyle and membership company, as well as the world's largest provider of specialty insurance for classic vehicles. Hagerty is based in Traverse City, Michigan and also operates in Canada, Germany and the United Kingdom.

== History ==
Hagerty was launched in 1984 by Frank and Louise Hagerty after they could not find good insurance coverage for their wooden boats. The company initially focused on providing coverage for antique boats, and later expanded into cars and other vehicles. In 1991, the company added coverage for classic cars.

In 2000, McKeel Hagerty, son of Frank and Louise, became CEO. Under McKeel Hagerty's guidance, the company developed an automotive media arm by launching Hagerty magazine (ISSN 2162-8033), covering the classic and enthusiast vehicle market. In 2020, the magazine was renamed Hagerty Drivers Club Magazine.

Hagerty published its first annual Hagerty Price Guide in 2008, a valuation tool that informs classic car buyers on how to best navigate the digital automotive age. Hagerty also originated both the Historic Vehicle Association (HVA) and the RPM Foundation.

In 2017, the company adopted saving driving and preserving automotive culture for future generations as its corporate mission. To support the mission, Hagerty launched Hagerty Drivers Club, offering members access to events, automotive discounts, roadside service and more. In 2017, Hagerty also acquired DriveShare. The company became the owner and organizer of the Greenwich Concours d'Elégance and established MotorsportReg.com and Hagerty Garage + Social in 2019. In 2021 it bought the California Mille, the Concours d’Elegance of America, and the Amelia Island Concours d'Elegance.

In December 2021, Hagerty went public by merging with Aldel Financial, a SPAC, under the symbol HGTY. The merger deal was valued at $3.13 billion.

In January 2023, Hagerty launched Hagerty ECO (Enthusiast Carbon Offset) scheme for classic motorists to offset their carbon emissions. Hagerty partner with a third party to plant trees on your behalf. The scheme quickly came under scruitiny when the third party was found to be taking 20-30% of offset donations to simply pass the funds on to other charities. There are also no calculations provided as to how they achieve their CO_{2} or 'Trees' figures.

A 2023 Bloomberg News article documented how within two years McKeel Hagerty turned the small family business into a conglomerate with dominance in the industry and classic car insurance markets.

== In popular culture ==
Hagerty partnered with Japanese video game developer Polyphony Digital in 2022 to appear in the racing video game Gran Turismo 7. Hagerty branding appeared in the game's "Legend Cars Dealer" screen, and CEO McKeel Hagerty also featured, describing the cars that were available for the player to purchase, dubbed the "Hagerty Collection."
