= Mecum Auctions =

American car auction company

Mecum Auctions, Inc.
- Industry: Auctioneering
- Founded: 1988
- Founders: Dana Mecum
- Headquarters: Walworth, Wisconsin, United States
- Area served: United States
- Key people: Dana Mecum (president); Dave Magers (CEO)
- Services: Collector car auctions
- Owner: Mecum family
- Website: www.mecum.com

Mecum Auctions, Inc. is an American auction company specializing in collector cars and motorcycles. It was founded by Dana Mecum in 1988, and was originally based in Marengo, Illinois. Since 2011, it has been headquartered in Walworth, Wisconsin. The company hosts various auction events across the United States. Television coverage began in 2008, contributing to the popularity of the events.

== History ==
Mecum Auctions was founded in 1988 by Dana Mecum, a car enthusiast whose father operated a dealership in Marengo, Illinois. Dana Mecum initially bought 40 semi-trailer trucks in the 1980s, and traded 10 of them for four houses which he rented out. According to him, "The tenants started calling me in the middle of the night to fix this and that. So I went back to the guy I traded the trucks to and gave him his houses back and told him he could keep the trucks. He said, 'You know, you're going to lose a lot of money,' and I said, 'Yeah, but I'm going to get a lot of sleep'". Mecum subsequently traded his remaining trucks to a North Carolina man in exchange for 40 collector cars; these, in addition to his own collection of 15 cars, prompted him to hold an auto auction.

The company's first auction was held in Rockford, Illinois in 1988. It was intended as a one-time event, but was derailed by 90-mile-per-hour winds, followed by lawsuits from dissatisfied attendees. This prompted Mecum to hold another auction the following year. He would go on to continue the auctions for 14 years before finally turning a profit. During that time, he was approached by a prospective buyer who eventually declined the $500,000 sale price, which represented the amount of debt Mecum owed. The company auctioned its 50,000th vehicle in 2008. Mecum Auctions was headquartered in Marengo for years, before relocating to Walworth, Wisconsin in 2011. It is one of the area's top employers, with more than 300 workers.

Since 2013, Mecum Auctions has been overseen by chief executive officer Dave Magers, who formerly served as chief financial officer of Country Financial. Dana Mecum had previously overseen the company himself: "I was a control freak, and around 1999 I got sick and had to let go and let other people do things. That was part of how I got sick: I was trying to do everything". Mecum remains involved in the business as president, operating it with help from his wife and their four sons, including Frank Mecum as consignment director. A new trucking division, Mecum Auto Transport, was established in 2017. It provides transportation, via semi-trailers, for consigned and sold vehicles.

== Auction overview ==
Mecum's auctions attract a varied clientele, including a large number of non-bidding spectators, who make up approximately 90 percent of attendees. Events receive anywhere from 20,000 to 100,000 attendees.

The inaugural auction event, known as the Rockford Spring Classic, was held at the Greater Rockford Airport in 1988. During the next two years, it was held at the Metro Center, also in Rockford. In 1991, the event relocated to the Boone County fairgrounds in Belvidere, Illinois. Despite the location change, the event retained the Rockford name. Auctions in Belvidere typically attracted 12,000 to 15,000 people.

In 1996, Mecum added premier auctions, offering vehicles of a higher quality and attracting approximately 1,000 people to each event. By that point, Mecum also hosted an annual Chevrolet auction in Grayslake, Illinois. It was one of the largest Chevy-focused auction events in North America. In addition, the company also hosted Bloomington Gold, a Corvette-focused event held each June in Bloomington, Illinois. Mecum purchased the rights to the show in the 1990s, before selling them in 2012. Mecum announced two years later that it would no longer participate in the event due to diminishing interest. By that point, many of Mecum's regional auctions now offered Corvettes, attracting local buyers who had since found the Bloomington location to be less convenient. Sales for the 2013 event had reached only $1.8 million, down from a high of $7.7 million in 2008.

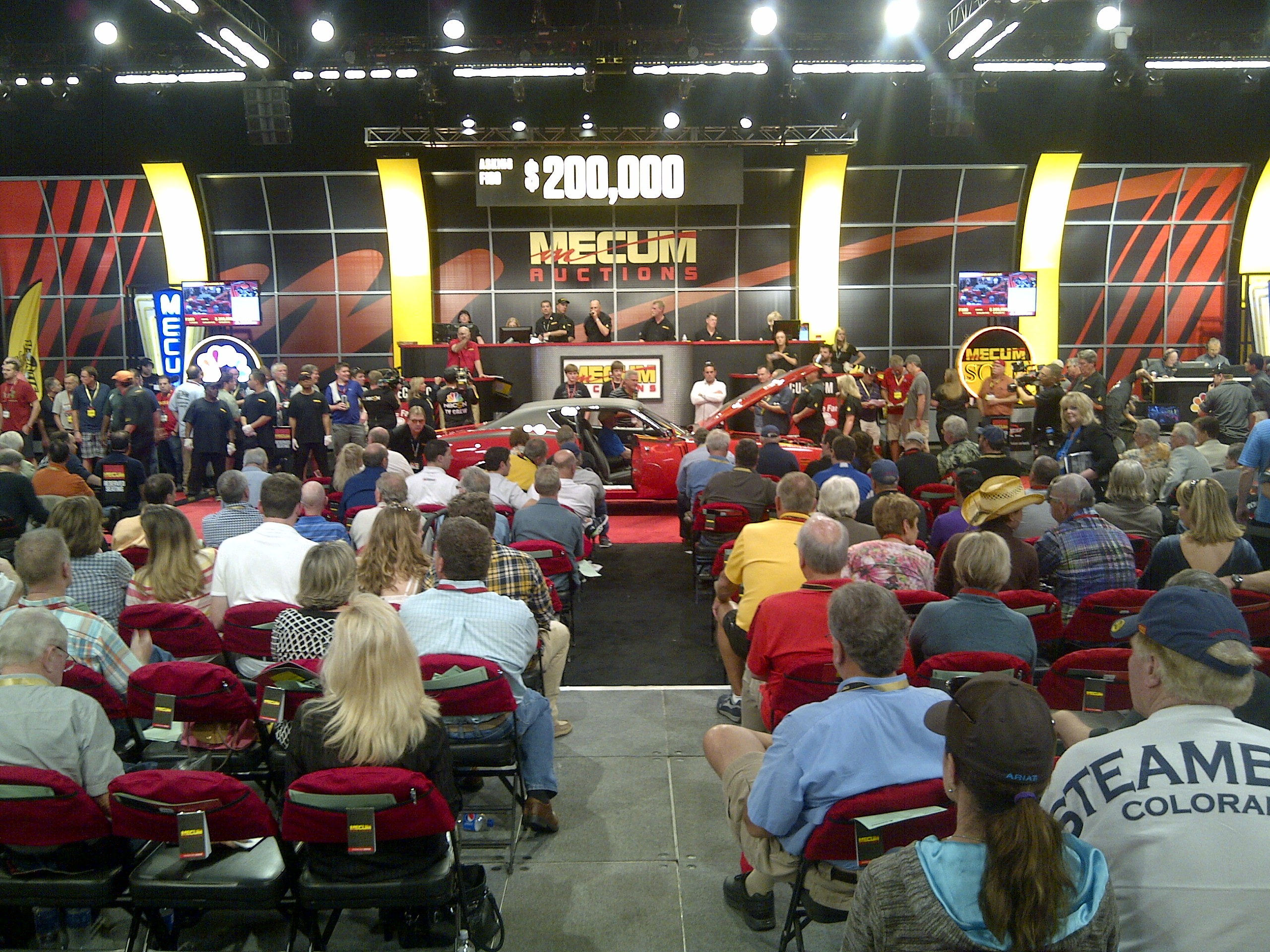
The 2015 Kissimmee event, representing a typical Mecum auction.

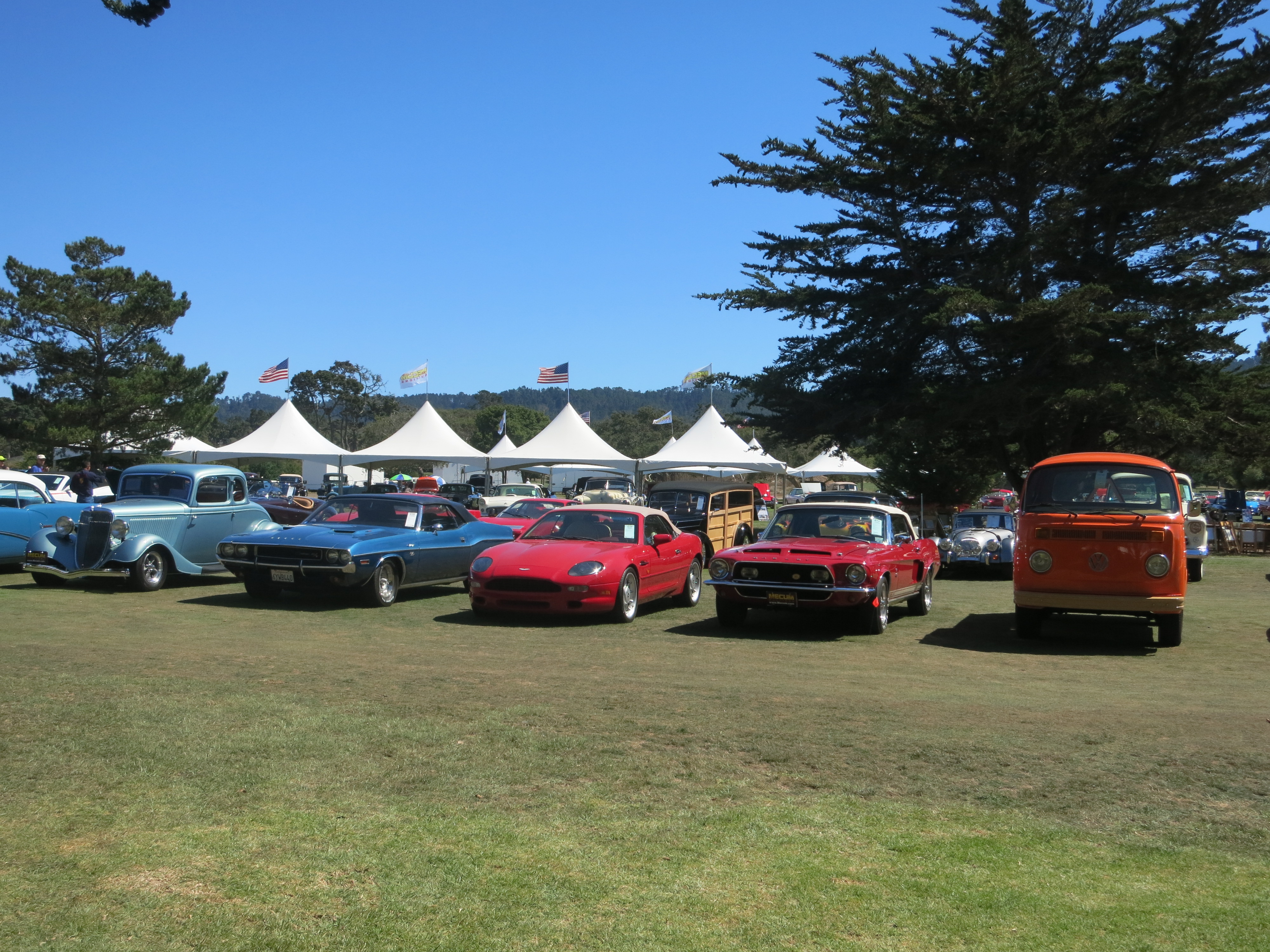
Vehicles on display at Mecum's 2013 Monterey auction

As of 2016, Mecum auctions 15,000 vehicles annually, ranging from muscle cars to pre-World War I vehicles, with annual sales of $300 million. The company specializes in muscle cars from the 1950s to 1970s. By 2017, the company had added separate auction events dealing solely with motorcycles and farmer tractors respectively. It also added road art to its main auctions. As of 2017, the company hosts 14 annual events across the U.S., including a $100 million, 10-day main event each January in Kissimmee, Florida. It is Mecum's largest annual auction, growing considerably from the company's first Florida event, held in 2002.

Other auction locations have included Anaheim, California, Harrisburg, Pennsylvania, Indianapolis, Indiana, Las Vegas, Nevada, and Monterey, California. The events are overseen by a traveling team of 200 workers, and the vehicles often have a history related to the region where they are being auctioned. Some vehicles are auctioned to raise money for charities, such as the last Mitsubishi Eclipse ever manufactured (2011).

During the COVID-19 lockdowns in 2020, Mecum revamped its online bidding system and added livestream footage of auction events. Online bidding saw a marked increase following the redesign, which also contributed to a rise in revenue, with a record $675 million brought in during 2021.

== Television coverage ==
Television coverage of the auctions began in 2008, around the start of the Great Recession. Up to that time, approximately 90 percent of Mecum's buyers were car dealers who would resell the vehicles after auction. Many of the dealers went out of business due to the recession, and the remainder would become sellers at Mecum auctions. The television coverage produced a large number of buyers who were end consumers, as opposed to dealers. According to Dana Mecum, "Without TV, not only would we not have grown, we might not have survived".

The auctions were originally broadcast on Discovery HD, which became Velocity in 2011. NBC Sports Network (NBCSN) took over coverage in 2014, and viewership saw an increase of more than 500 percent. As of 2017, the auctions attracted more viewers for the network than any other event with the exception of Premier League football. Mecum Dealmakers, a television program chronicling the auction preparations and management, also aired on NBCSN from 2014 to 2015. NBCSN ceased operations in December 2021, and Motor Trend took over coverage the following month.

In March 2025, it was announced that Mecum would move to ESPN+.

== Notable sales ==
Vehicle	Sale price	Auction details	Notes
1963 Ferrari 250 GT California Spyder SWB	$17.85 million	Kissimmee, 2024	The most expensive vehicle ever auctioned by Mecum.
1908 Strap Tank Harley-Davidson	$935,000	Las Vegas, 2023	Among 12 in the world, and one of the earliest models manufactured by Harley-Davidson. It is the most expensive motorcycle ever auctioned.
1953 Hirohata Merc	$1.95 million	Kissimmee, 2022	A custom car that originated as a 1951 Mercury Eight.
1963 Chevrolet Corvette	$1.5 million	Schaumburg, 2013	A customized vehicle once owned by General Motors executive Harley Earl.
1963 Pontiac Catalina	$530,000	Indianapolis, 2014	One of 14 built by Pontiac for drag racing.
1964 Ford GT40 prototype	$7 million	Houston, 2014	Among the most expensive vehicles ever auctioned by Mecum.
1965 Shelby Daytona Cobra coupe	$7.25 million	Monterey, 2009	Formerly the most expensive vehicle ever auctioned by Mecum.
1968 Ford Mustang GT Fastback	$3.74 million	Kissimmee, 2020	Driven by actor Steve McQueen during a chase in the 1968 film Bullitt. Most expensive Mustang ever auctioned.
1976 Porsche 930 Turbo Carrera	$1.95 million	Monterey, 2015	Once owned by actor Steve McQueen.
1979 Porsche 930 Turbo	$324,500	Schaumburg, 2018	Once owned by football player Walter Payton. One of 1,200 such models produced for the U.S. market in 1979.
2004 Ford Shelby Cobra Concept	$2.6 million	Monterey, 2021	One-of-a-kind concept car by Ford Motor Company.
