= RM Sotheby's =

Collector car auction company headquartered in Blenheim, Ontario, Canada

- Company type: Privately held company
- Industry: Auctioneering
- Founded: Ontario, Canada (1991)
- Founder: Rob Myers
- Headquarters: Blenheim, Ontario, Canada
- Area served: Worldwide
- Key people: Rob Myers (chairman and CEO); Gord Duff (global head of auctions)
- Products: Classic cars and memorabilia
- Services: Auctions, private sales, financial services, valuations, estate planning, and restoration
- Subsidiaries: RM Auctions
- Website: RMSothebys.com

RM Sotheby's is a collector car auction company headquartered in Blenheim, Ontario, Canada, with offices across the United States, Europe, and the Middle East. The company specializes in the sale of classic, vintage, sports, and exotic cars, and is responsible for the sale of seven of the top ten most expensive cars ever sold at auction.

== History ==
=== Company ===
RM Sotheby’s, formerly RM Auctions, began as RM Auto Restoration in 1976, founded by Rob Myers as a small restoration shop with a focus on pre-war classics in Chatham, Ontario. In 1991, RM Auctions was formed, later hosting its first auction in Toronto, Ontario, in 1992. RM went on to host its first Monterey auction in 1997—which remains its biggest yearly event—its first Amelia Island auction in 1999, and its first Arizona auction in 2000, all of which became annual events.

In 2006, RM Auctions took its first international step, establishing operations in London, England; its new-formed European division later hosted its first sale in 2007 at the Ferrari factory in Maranello, Italy. Later in the same year, RM Auctions hosted its second European sale in London in association with Sotheby’s—the London sale would go on to become an annual event. In 2023, RM Sotheby’s expanded its global reach further with an official launch of its presence in Dubai.

=== Notable sales ===
In 2022, RM Sotheby’s set the record for highest-grossing collector car auction ever with their Monterey sale grossing $239,258,340. During their Monterey sale, RM Sotheby’s sold the world’s most expensive new Porsche: a 2022 Porsche 911 Carrera known as “Sally” for 3.6 million USD. Created by Porsche in collaboration with Pixar, “Sally” is based on the character of the same name: a 2002 Porsche 911 Carrera from the 2006 movie Cars.

In 2022, RM Sotheby’s set a world record for the world’s most expensive Formula One car sold at auction at Sotheby’s Luxury Week in Geneva with the sale of Michael Schumacher’s 2003 Ferrari F2003-GA for CHF14,630,000.

A 600th Ferrari Daytona SP3 was built and sold at 2025 Monterey Car Week with all proceeds going to The Ferrari Foundation for 26,000,000 USD.

== Description ==
Today, founder Rob Myers remains the Chief Executive Officer.
