= Barn find =

Low-quality classic car

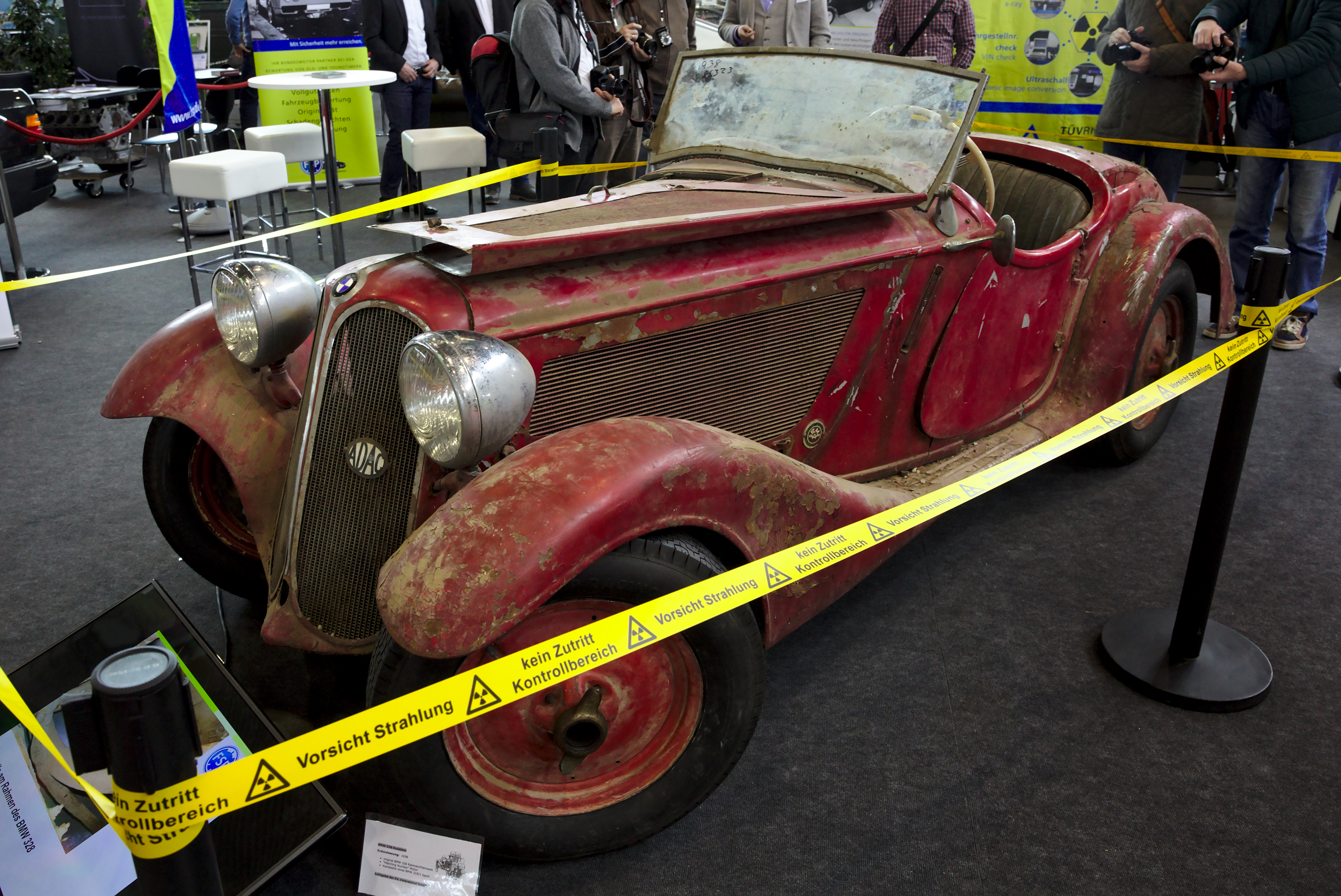
BMW Roadster from the 1930s

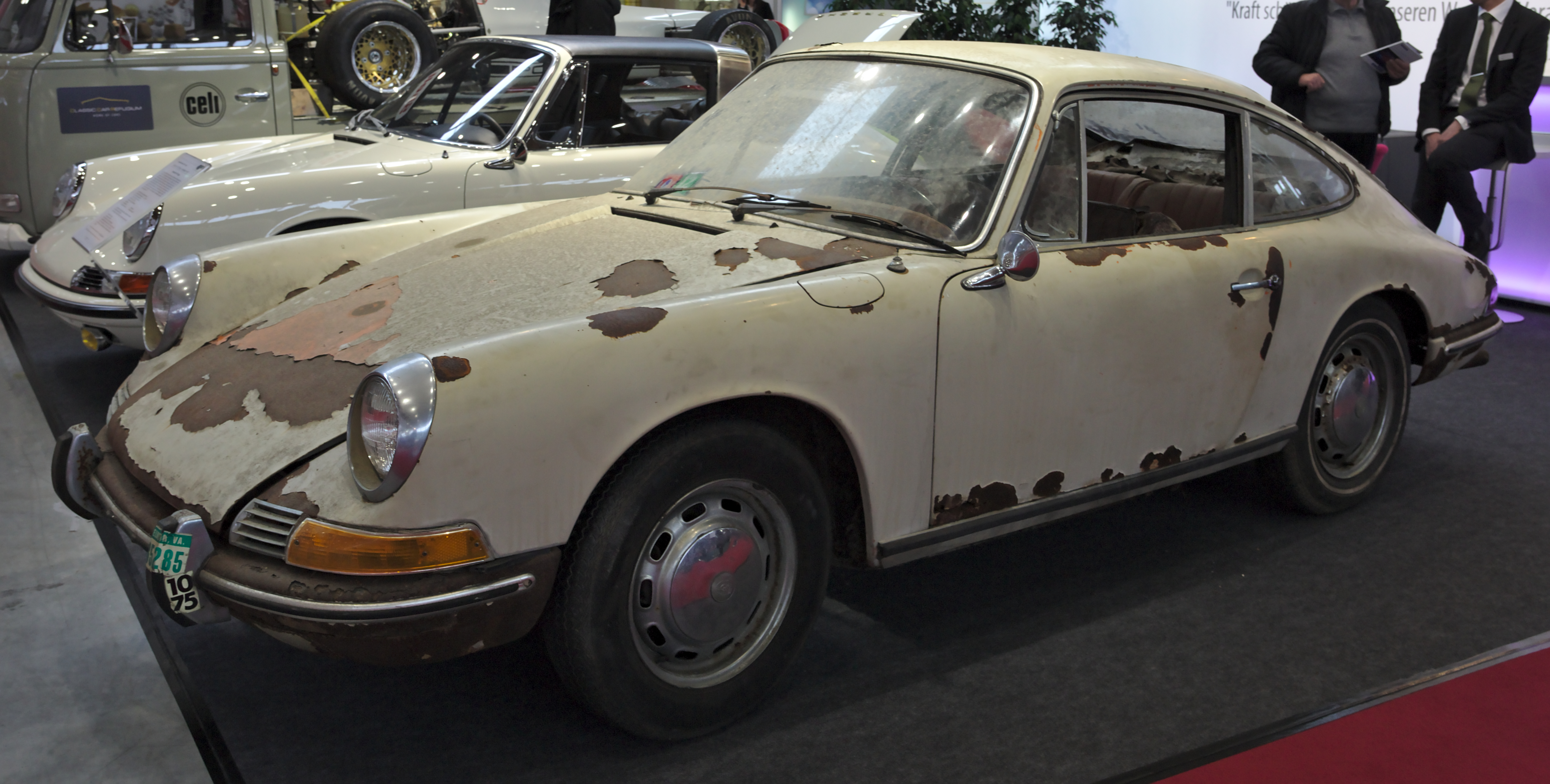
Porsche 911

A barn find is a classic car, aircraft or motorcycle that has been rediscovered after being stored, often in derelict condition. The term comes from their tendency to be found in places such as barns, sheds, carports and outbuildings where they have been stored for many years. The term usually applies to vehicles that are rare and valuable, and which are consequently of great interest to collectors and enthusiasts despite their poor condition.

Barn finds can fetch high prices when sold. A 1967 Ferrari 330 GTS spider was sold for US$2.1 million in January 2014. The car had suffered an engine fire in 1969 and had been stored in a garage for 44 years. Despite this, it sold for more than a fully restored example sold in 2013.

In the past, barn-find cars were typically subjected to exhaustive restoration, to return them to a condition close to that when they were new. However, the current trend is to treat the cars more sympathetically, to avoid restoration that removes evidence of the car's history and to place greater value on any original features the car retains even if they are in poor condition. In some cases, intense restoration can actually lower a car's value.

== Notable examples ==
- In 1952, the eventual founder of the Old Rhinebeck Aerodrome living aviation museum, Cole Palen, had the remains of a 1910-vintage Blériot XI aircraft donated to him by one Bill Champlin of Laconia, New Hampshire—the aircraft had lain derelict in a junkyard since it allegedly crashed in an early aviation meet in Saugus, Massachusetts before World War I, with the original finder, a Prof. H. H. Coburn, having seen the derelict Blériot in a junkyard in his boyhood, eventually acquired the remains of it and ended up donating it to Mr. Champlin, who donated it to Palen for restoration: currently N60094 is the second-oldest airworthy aircraft anywhere on Earth.
- The first prototype of the Shelby Daytona, chassis #CSX2287, was thought lost in the mid-1970's. In 2001 the car was rediscovered in a rental storage unit in California. After legal battles over the ownership of the then-estimated 4 million US dollar car, CSX2287 has been repaired and restored and is now part of the permanent collection of the Simeone Foundation Automotive Museum in Philadelphia, PA, USA.
- In 2014, a collection of 60 derelict cars was found at a farm in Western France. The collection included a Ferrari California Spyder, formerly owned by Alain Delon, that sold for €15.9 million when auctioned in 2015. There were several Talbot Lago T26s, one of which was formerly owned by King Farouk of Egypt. Other cars were built by Bugatti, Hispano-Suiza, Panhard-Levassor, Delahaye and Delage.
- In 2015, five vehicles were sold that had been stored in a barn in Austin, Texas since the 1970s. These included three Cadillacs built between 1932 and 1938, a 1908 REO Model G and a 1923 Milburn Electric Model 27L.
- The Grumman F8F Bearcat fighter known as Rare Bear was discovered in a derelict state next to a runway by Lyle Shelton, who restored it to flying condition (using a large number of parts from other aircraft) and eventually modified it into a high-speed racer to compete in the Reno Air Races.
- A collection of 230 cars was sold for auction from 19 May to 7 June 2023 in the Netherlands.
