= Ferrari 330 =

Overview
- Manufacturer: Ferrari
- Production: 1963–1968

Body and chassis
- Class: Grand tourer
- Layout: FR layout

Powertrain
- Engine: 4.0 L (3967.44 cc) Tipo 209 Colombo V12

The Ferrari 330 was a series of V12 powered automobiles produced by Ferrari in 2+2 GT Coupé, two-seat Berlinetta, spyder, and race car versions between 1963 and 1968. The name "330" refers to the approximate displacement of each single cylinder in cubic centimeters.

The first, the 2+2 330 America, was a 250 GT/E with a larger 4.0-litre engine; the 330 GTC/GTS shared its chassis with the 275; the 330 GT 2+2 had its own chassis and bodywork; the mid-engined 330P racer was part of the Ferrari P series, produced in four models. Production ended in 1968 with the introduction of the Ferrari 365 series.

All 330 models used an evolution of the 400 Superamerica's 4.0 L Colombo V12 engine. Bore and stroke were unusual 77 mm by 71 mm. It was substantially changed, with wider bore spacing and an alternator replacing a generator.

== 330 America ==
330 America
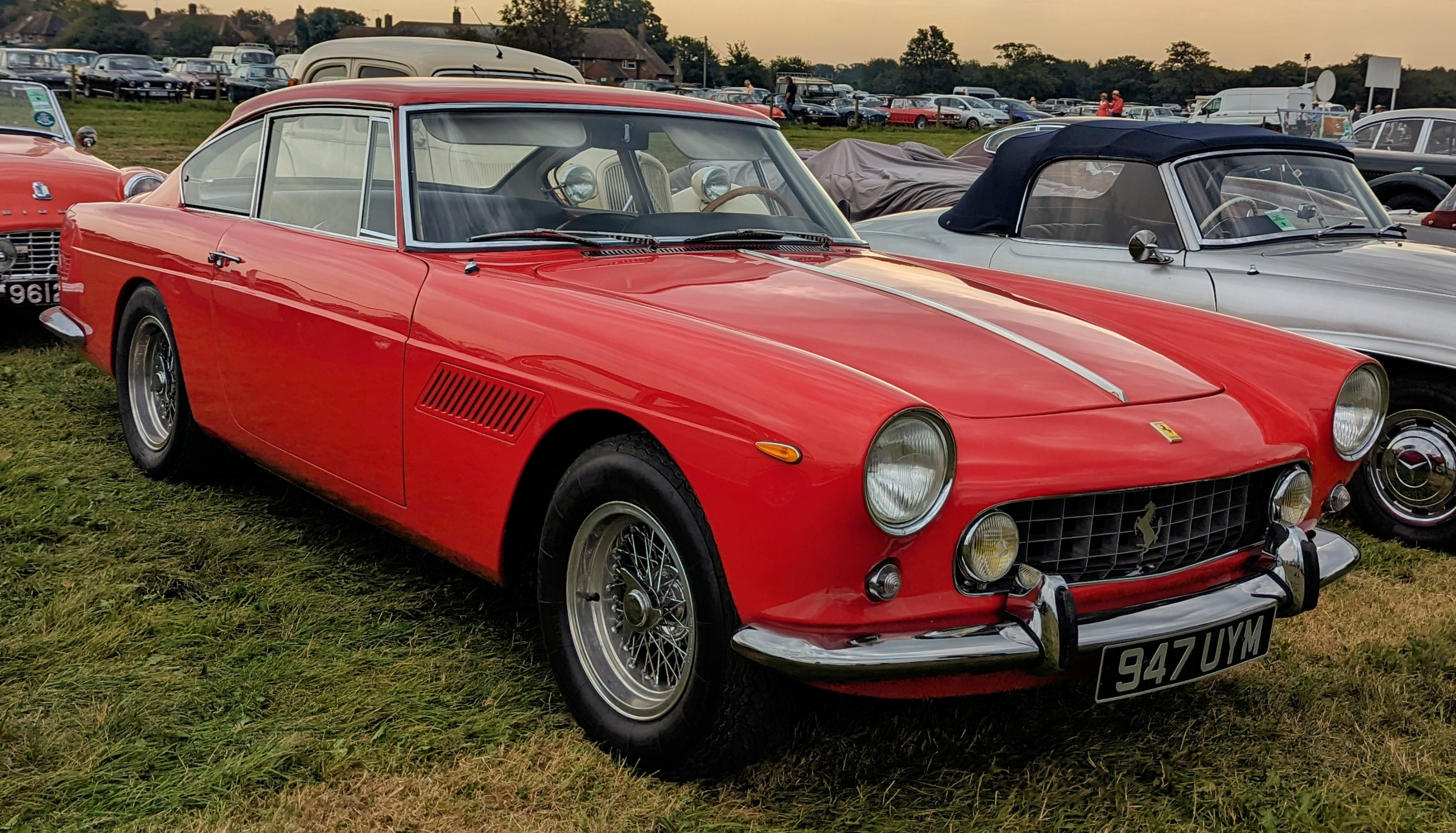

Overview
- Production: 1963; 50 produced
- Designer: Pininfarina

Body and chassis
- Body style: 2+2 coupé
- Related: Ferrari 250 GT/E 2+2

Chronology
- Predecessor: Ferrari 250 GT/E 2+2
- Successor: Ferrari 330 GT 2+2

The 1963 330 America shared the outgoing 250 GT/E's chassis but not its engine, being powered by the new 4.0 L Tipo 209 V12, with 300 PS (220 kW) at 6600 rpm. Visually, the 330 America was almost identical to the Series III 250 GT/E, although some were fitted with an "America" badge on the rear. Like the 250 GT/E, the 330 America was fitted with 185VR15 Pirelli Cinturato tyres.

50 330 Americas were built in late 1963 before being replaced by the larger 330 GT 2+2.

== 330 GT 2+2 ==
330 GT 2+2
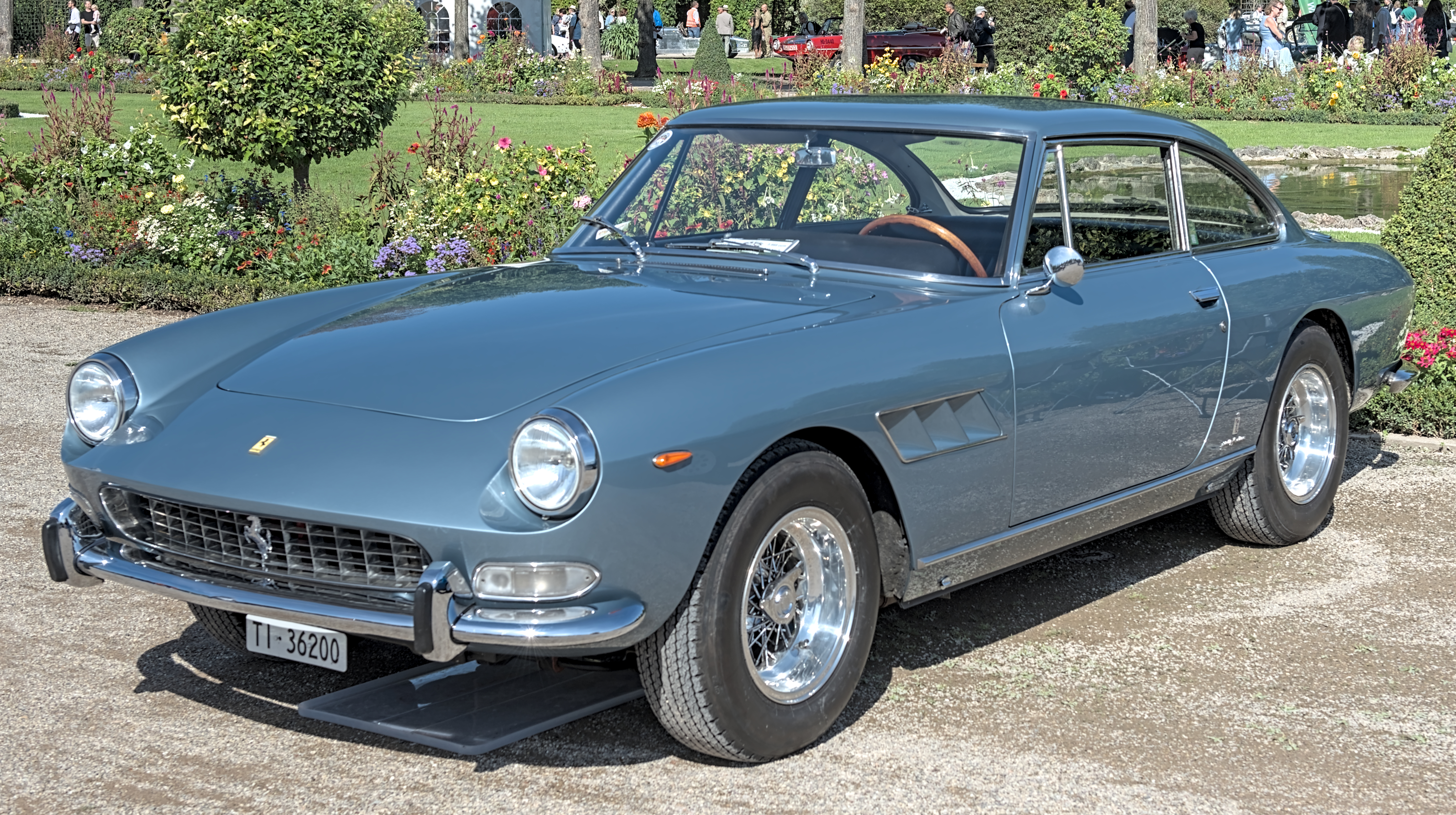
- 330 GT 2+2 Series II

Overview
- Production: 1964–1967; 1,099 produced
- Designer: Tom Tjaarda at Pininfarina

Body and chassis
- Body style: 2+2 coupé

Chronology
- Predecessor: Ferrari 250 GT/E 2+2; Ferrari 330 America
- Successor: Ferrari 365 GT 2+2

The provisional 330 America was replaced in January 1964 by the new 330 GT 2+2. It was first shown at the Brussels Show, early that year. It was much more than a re-engined 250, however, with a sharper nose and tail, quad headlights, and a wide grille. Power output remained the same at 300 PS (220 kW). The wheelbase was 50 mm (2.0 in) longer, but Koni adjustable shock absorbers improved handling. A dual-circuit Dunlop braking system was used with discs all around, though it separated brakes front to back rather than diagonally as on modern systems. When leaving the factory the 330 GT originally fitted Pirelli Cinturato 205VR15 tyres (CN72).

The 1965 Series II version featured a five-speed gearbox instead of the overdrive four-speed of the prior year. Other changes included the switch back to a dual-light instead of quad-light front, alloy wheels, and the addition of optional air conditioning and power steering. Prior to the introduction of the 'Series II' 330 GTs, a series of 125 'interim' cars were produced, with the quad-headlight external configuration of the Series I cars, but with the five-speed transmission and 'suspended' foot pedals of the 'Series II' cars.

625 Series I (including 125 'interim' cars) and 455 Series II 330 GT 2+2 cars had been built when the car was replaced by the 365 GT 2+2 in 1967. Production of the smaller 330 GTC and GTS models overlapped with the GT 2+2 for more than a year.

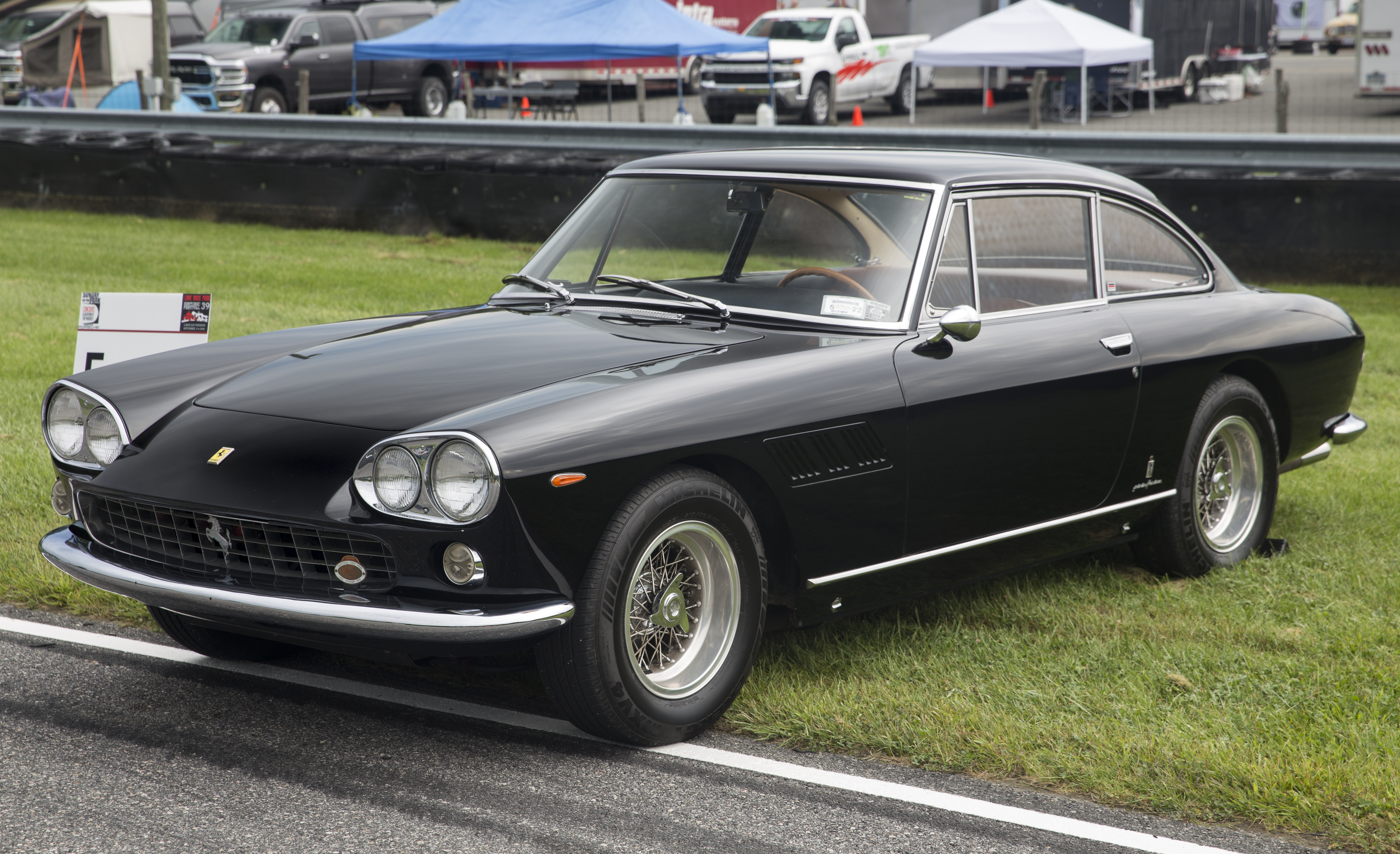
330 GT 2+2 Series I, with quad headlights.

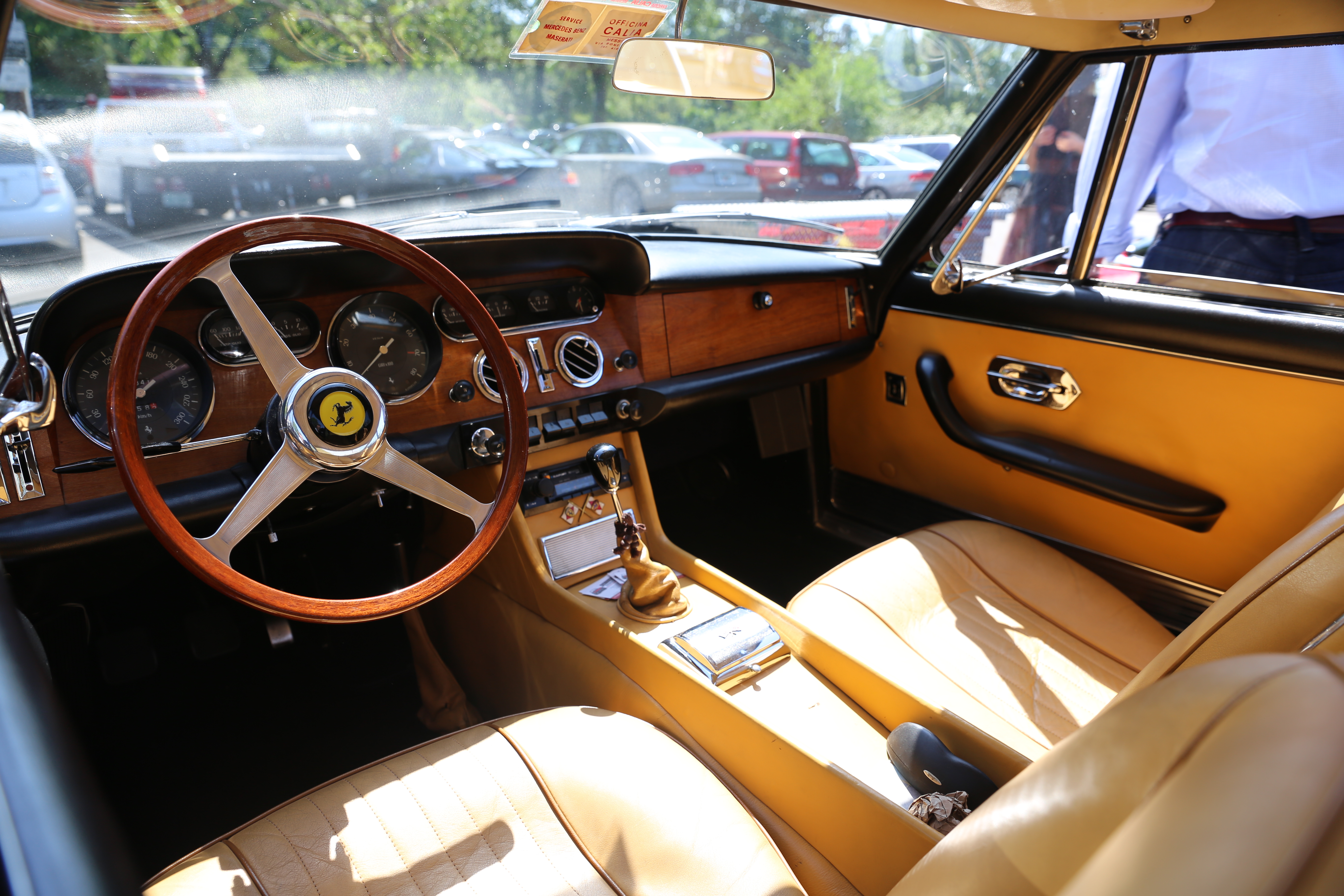
Series II interior.

=== Special versions ===
==== 330 GT 2+2 with 500 Superfast body ====
A one-off 330 GT 2+2 produced with a Ferrari 500 Superfast-style body for Prince Bernhard of The Netherlands. This one-off car sold at Bonhams' December 2003 Geneva auction for CHF 422,100 inc. premium.

Prince Bernhard of The Netherlands' 330 GT 2+2 with 500 Superfast body

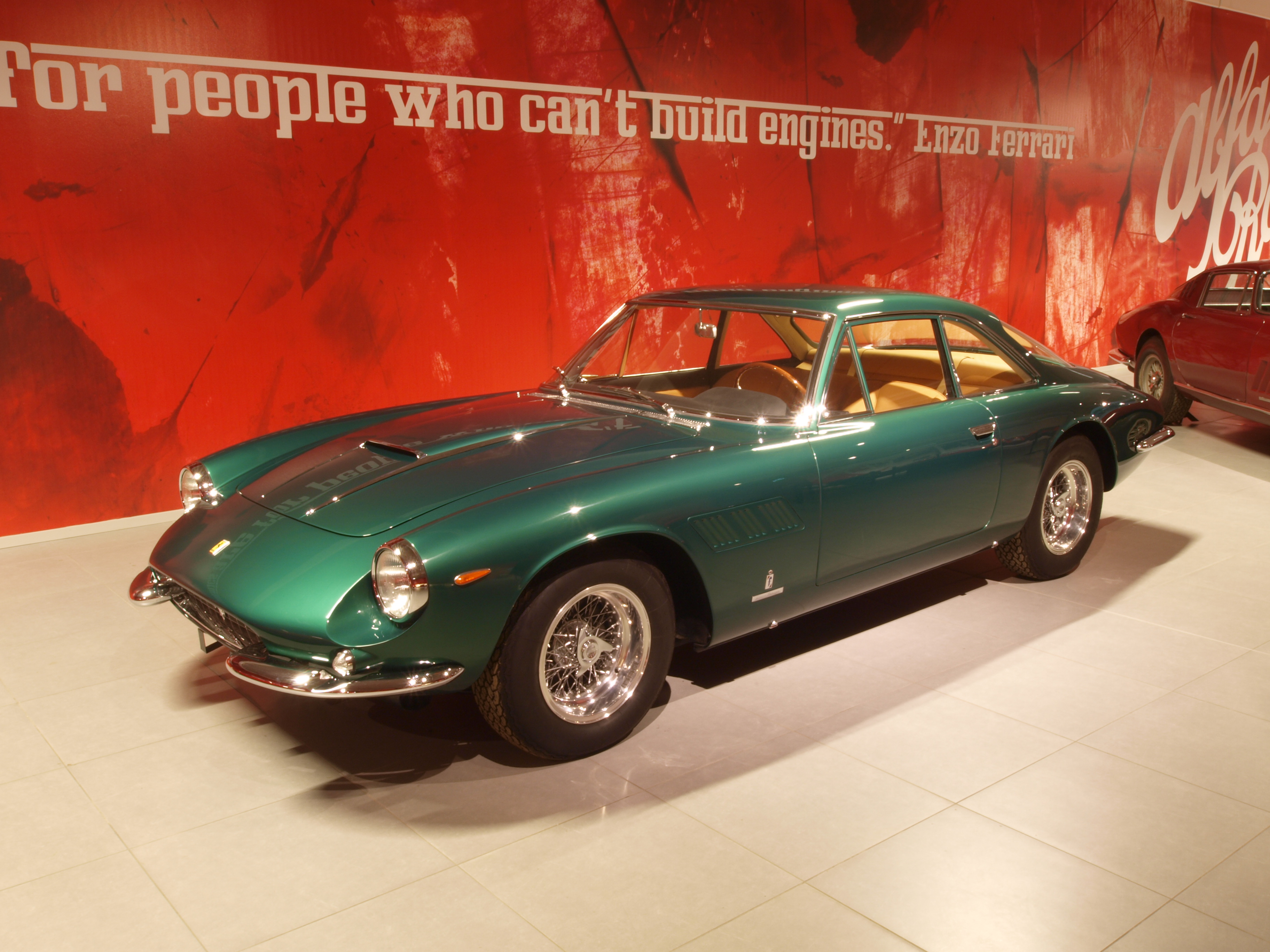

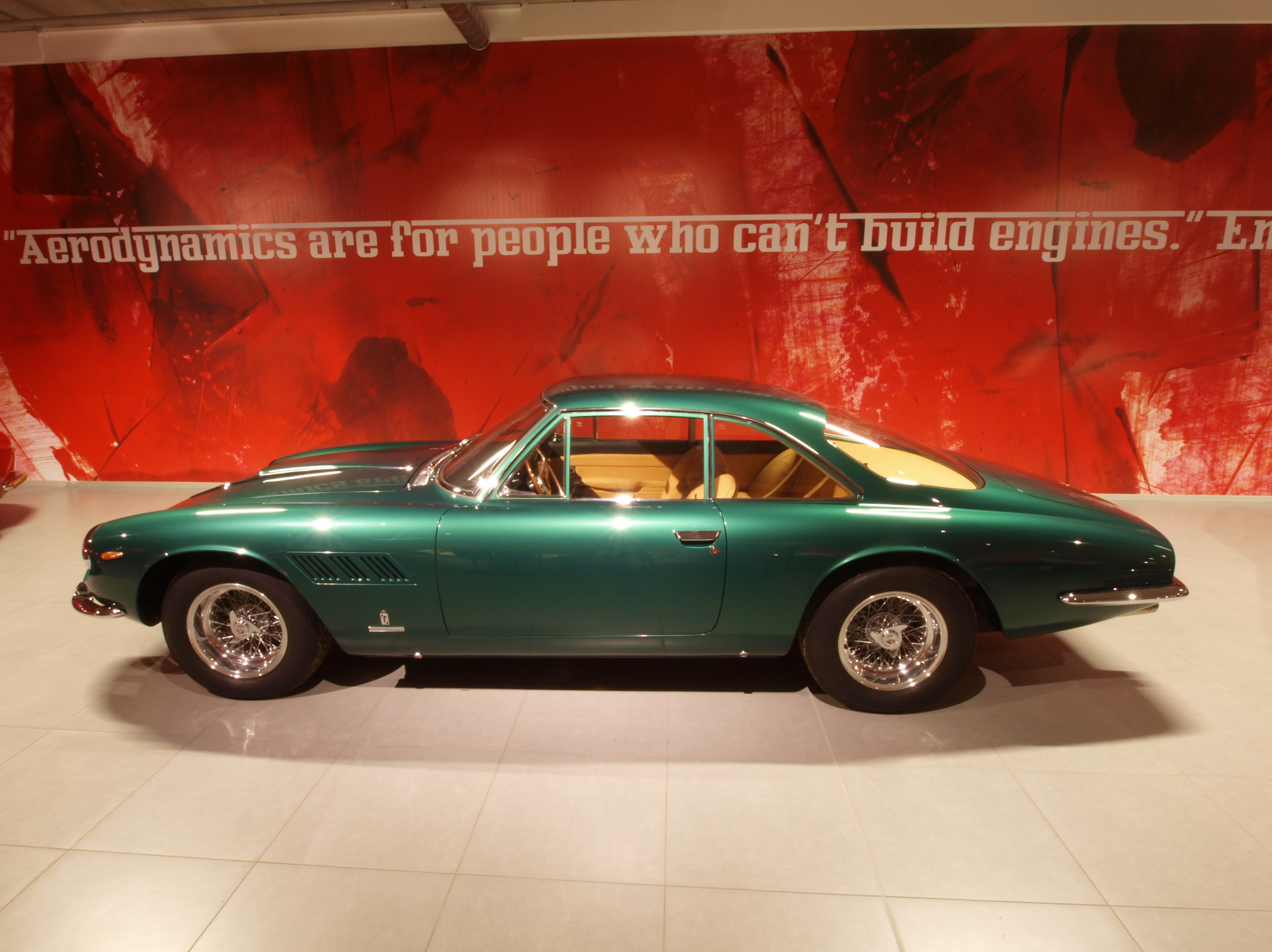

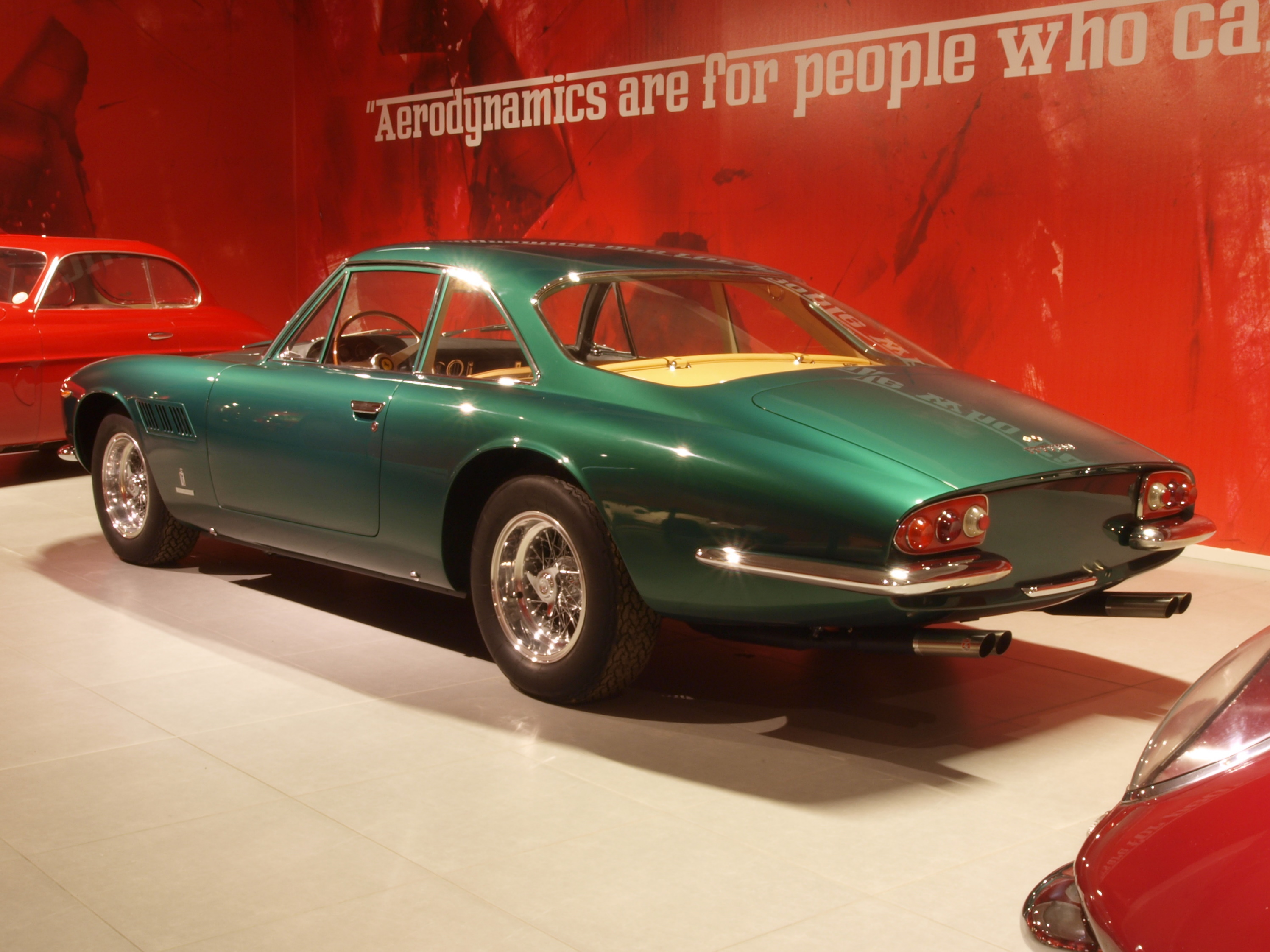

==== 330 GT 2+2 Shooting Brake ====
In 1967, Ferrari importer Luigi Chinetti Jr. decided to convert a 1965 330 GT 2+2 Series II (chassis no. 07963) to a shooting brake. He worked with American illustrator Bob Peak on the new design. The car was then sent to Carrozzeria Vignale in Turin to be built and it received engine no. 09269 there. The car was displayed on Vignale's stand at the 50th Torino Motor Show and was painted in metallic green with a gold metallic roof. It was repainted in bronze metallic in 2017. The car was offered for sale at Gooding and Co's 2017 Pebble Beach auction with a $700,000 - $900,000 estimate, and it did not sell. The car was again offered for sale at RM Sotheby's 2018 Petersen Museum auction where it sold for $313,000 (inclusive of applicable buyer's fee).

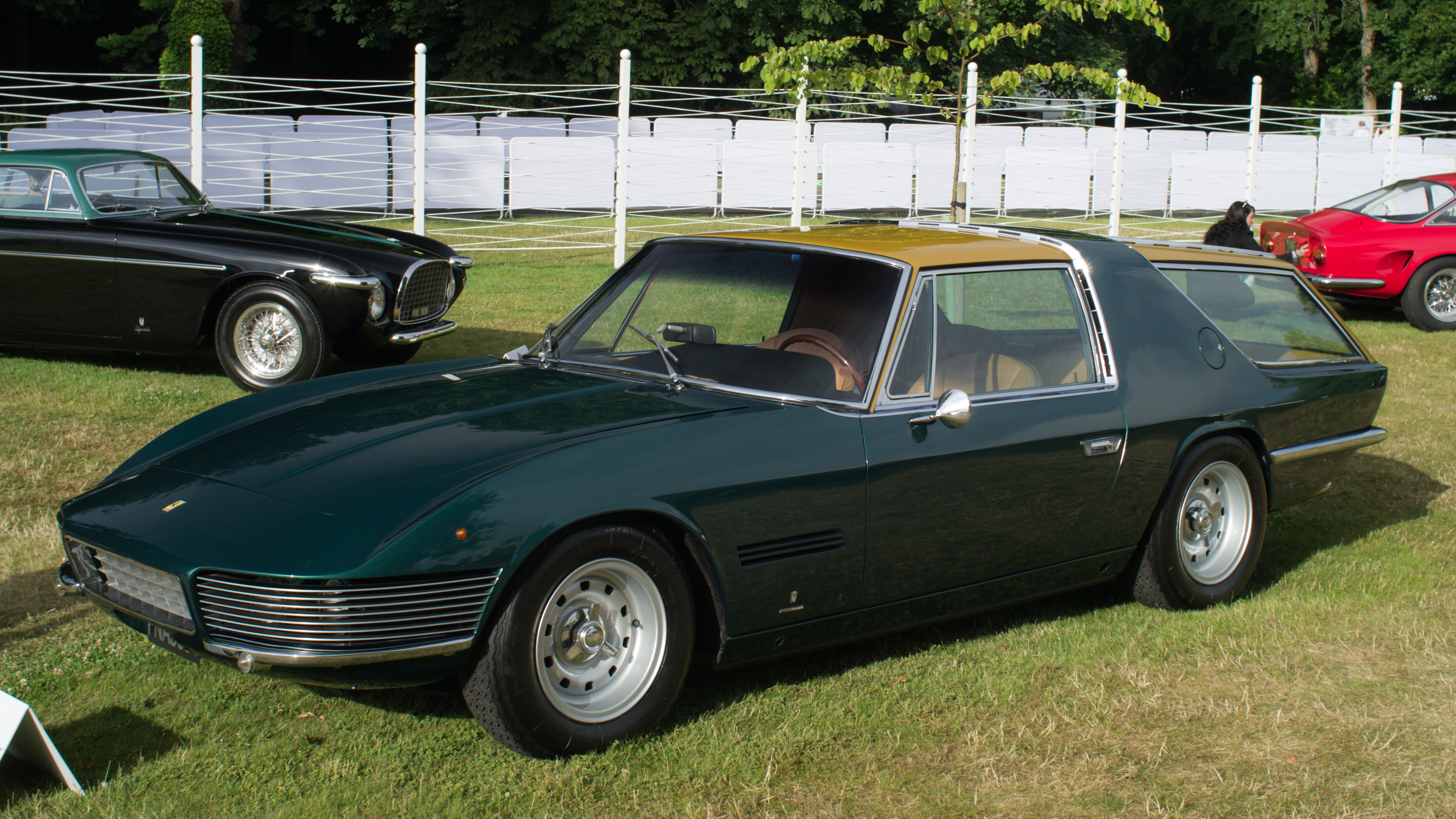
Painted as it was refinished during the conversion

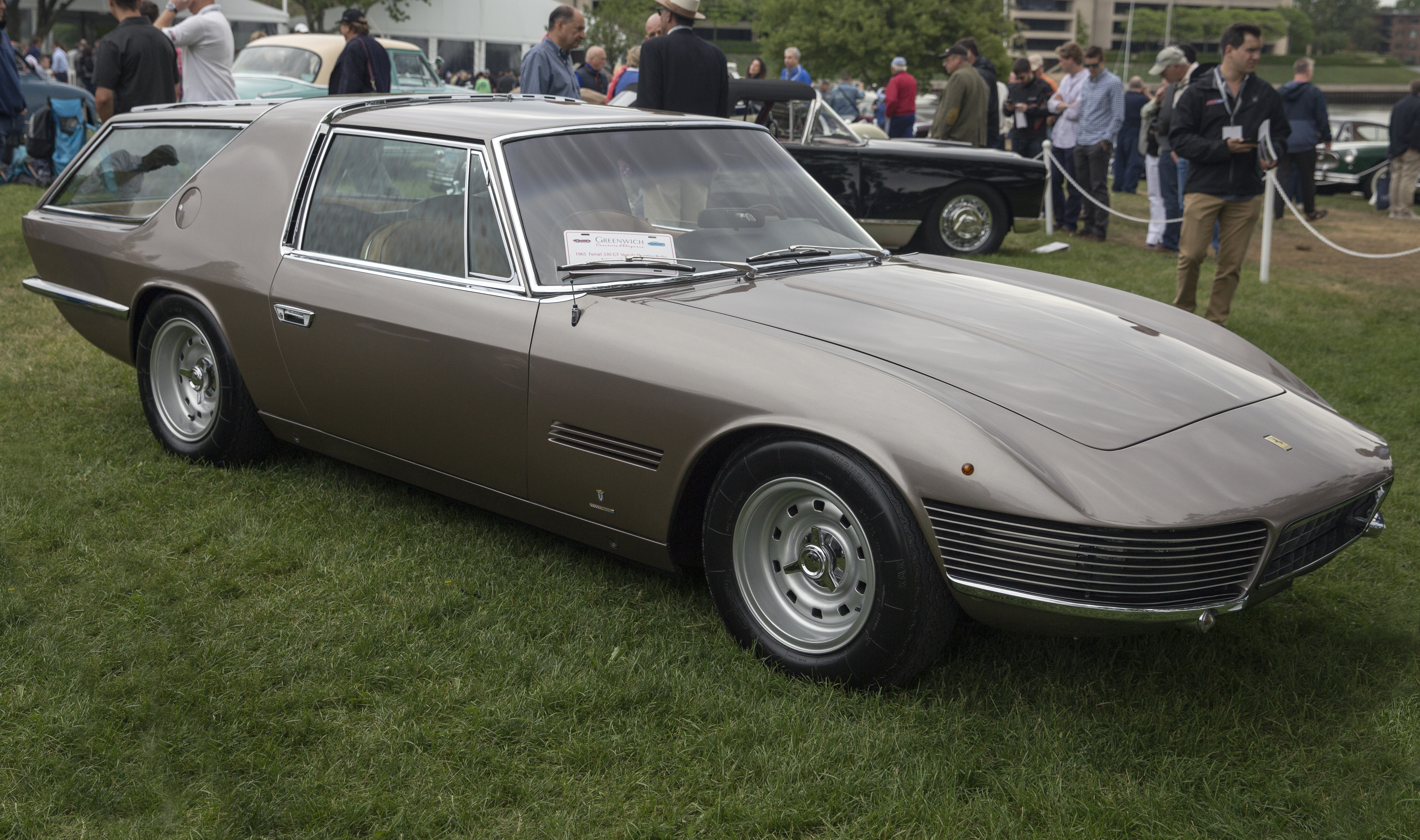
After its 2017 repaint

== 330 GTC/GTS ==
330 GTC, 330 GTS
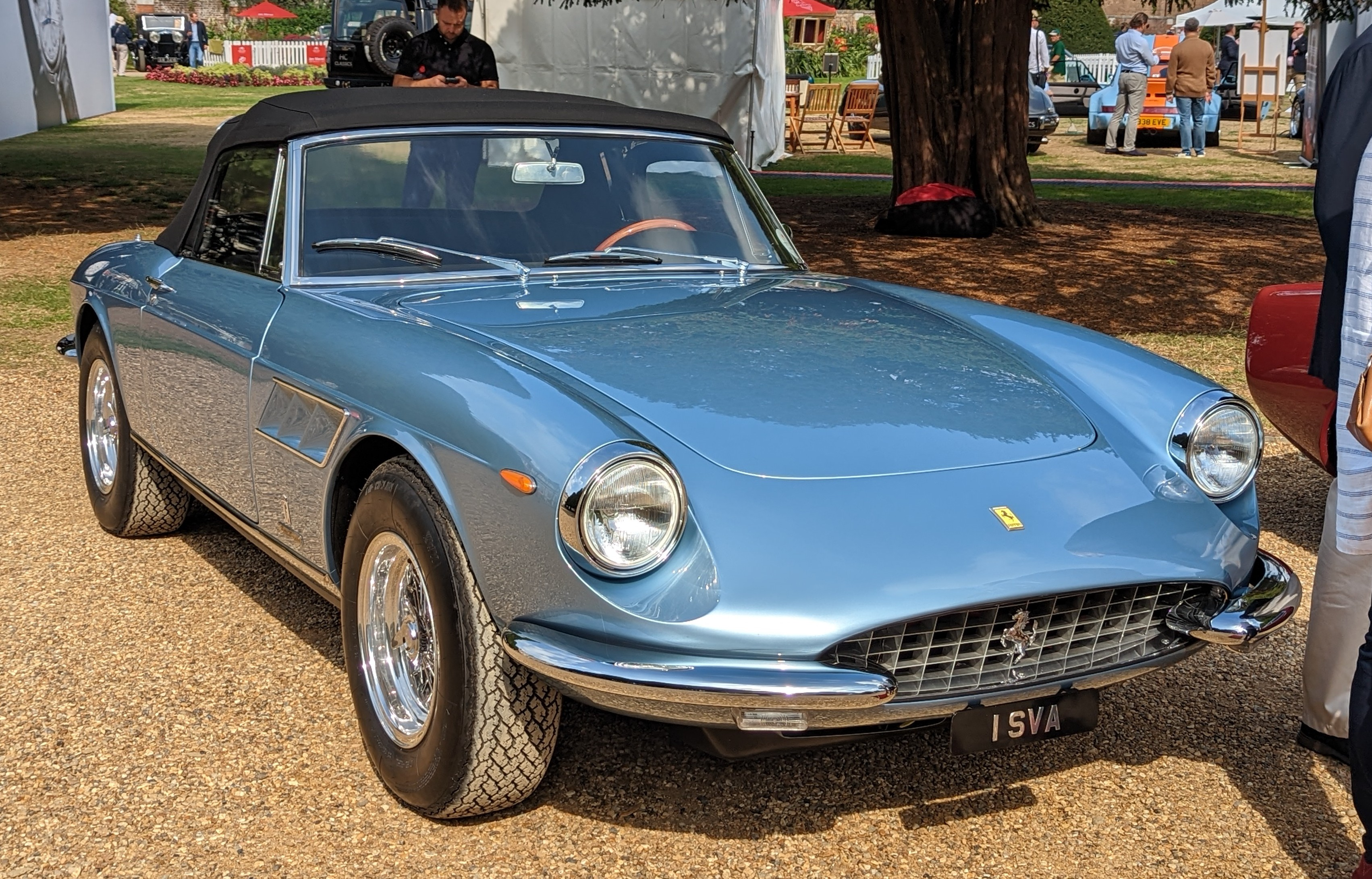
- Ferrari 330 GTS

Overview
- Production: 1966–1968; GTC: 598 produced GTS: 100 produced
- Designer: Pininfarina

Body and chassis
- Body style: GTC: 2-seat coupé GTS: 2-seat Spider

Chronology
- Predecessor: GTC: Ferrari 250 GT Coupé; GTS: Ferrari 275 GTS
- Successor: GTC: Ferrari 365 GTC; GTS: Ferrari 365 GTS

The 330 GTC and 330 GTS were more like their 275 counterparts than the 330 GT 2+2. They shared the short wheelbase of the 275 as well as its independent rear suspension and the same tyres, 205VR14 Michelin XWX. These models were more refined than earlier Ferraris, quieter and easier to drive. It has been stated that this "was probably the first Ferrari in which you could actually enjoy a radio".

The GTC berlinetta was introduced at the Geneva Motor Show in March 1966. It was a two-seater coupé with a Pininfarina-designed body.

The GTS spider was introduced later, at the October 1966 Paris Motor Show. It used the same chassis and drivetrain as the GTC.

About 600 coupés and 100 spiders were produced before the 1968 introduction of the 365 GTC and GTS. Both models' four-litre engines produced 300 PS (220 kW).

=== Special versions ===
A 1967 330 GTC was given one-off bodywork by Zagato at the behest of American importer Luigi Chinetti in 1974. This car's targa top bodywork led it to be called the "Zagato Convertible". It was exhibited at the 1974 Geneva International Motor Show.

Four 330 GTC Speciale coupés were constructed by Pininfarina in 1966. These used the 330 GTC chassis and drivetrain, with unique bodywork incorporating styling from the 365 California and other Pininfarina-designed Ferraris. This model was introduced at the 1967 Brussels Motor Show. Original customers included Princess Liliane de Réthy of Belgium and Maria Maddalena da Lisca, wife of Pietro Barilla.

In the early 1970s, Ferrari allowed Swiss specialist Felber to use the Ferrari name on a retro roadster using 330 GTC underpinnings. Six or seven examples of the Felber FF were built between 1974 and 1977, with hand-made aluminium bodywork by Panther Westwinds, who helped develop the car.

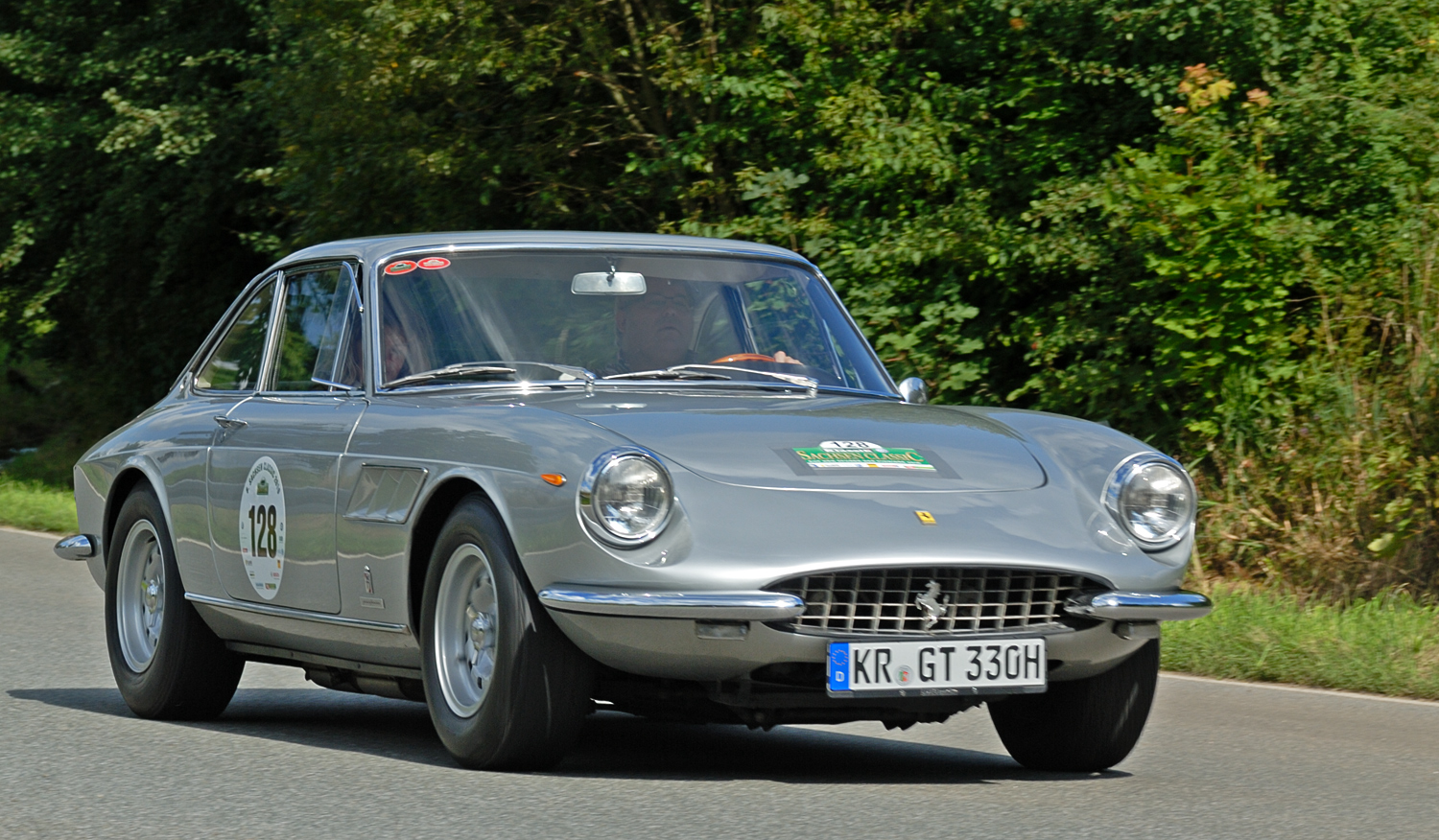
Ferrari 330 GTC

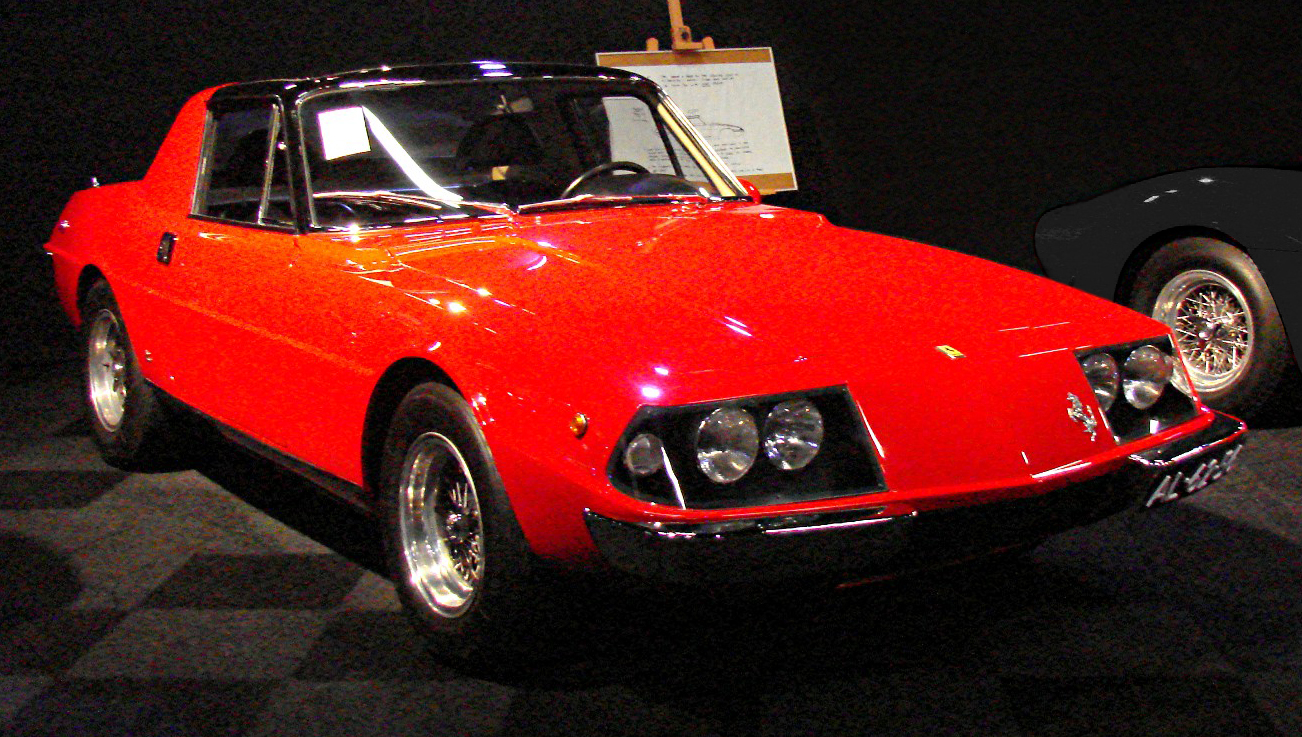
Zagato-bodied Ferrari 330 GTC

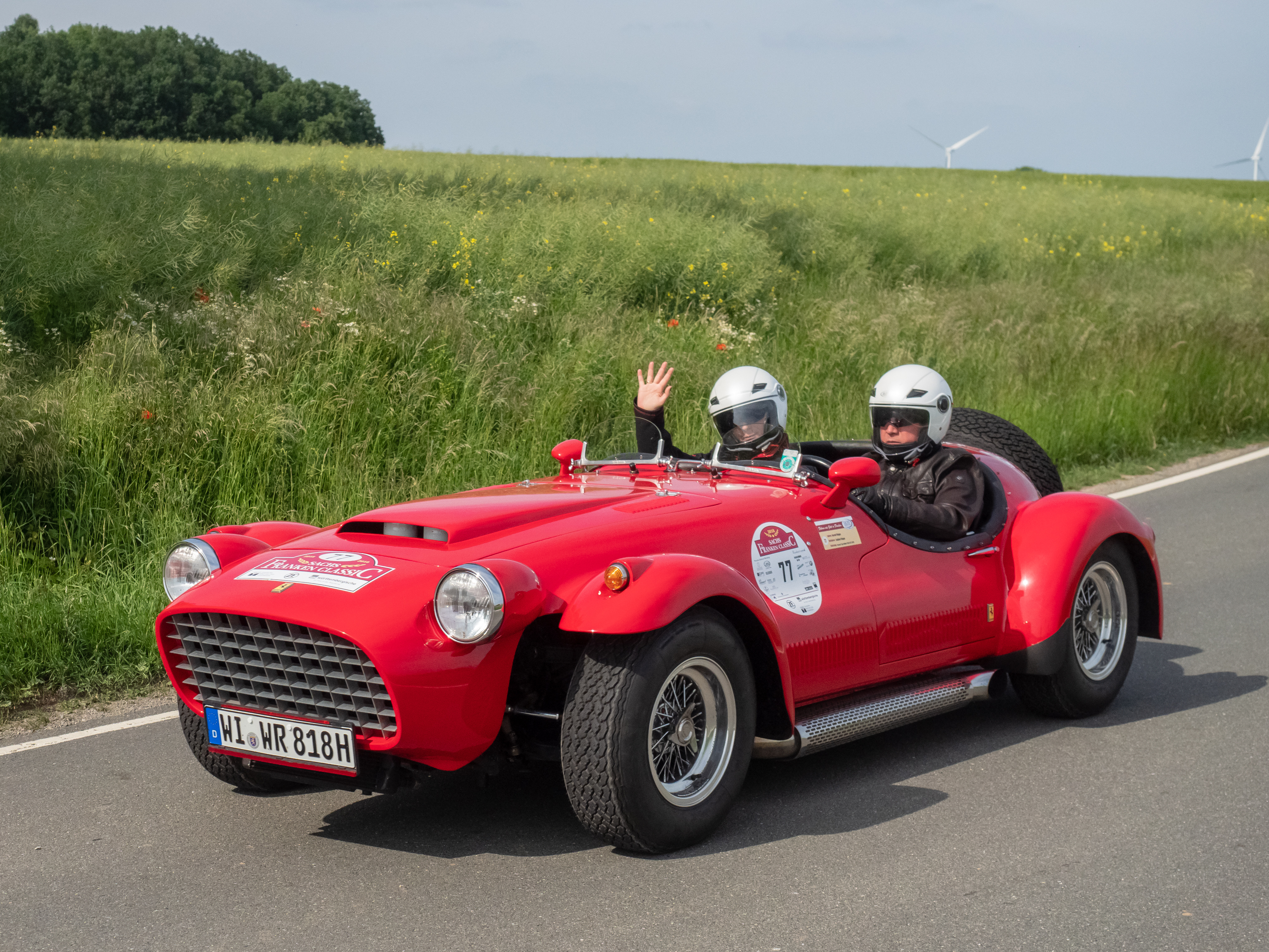
Felber FF

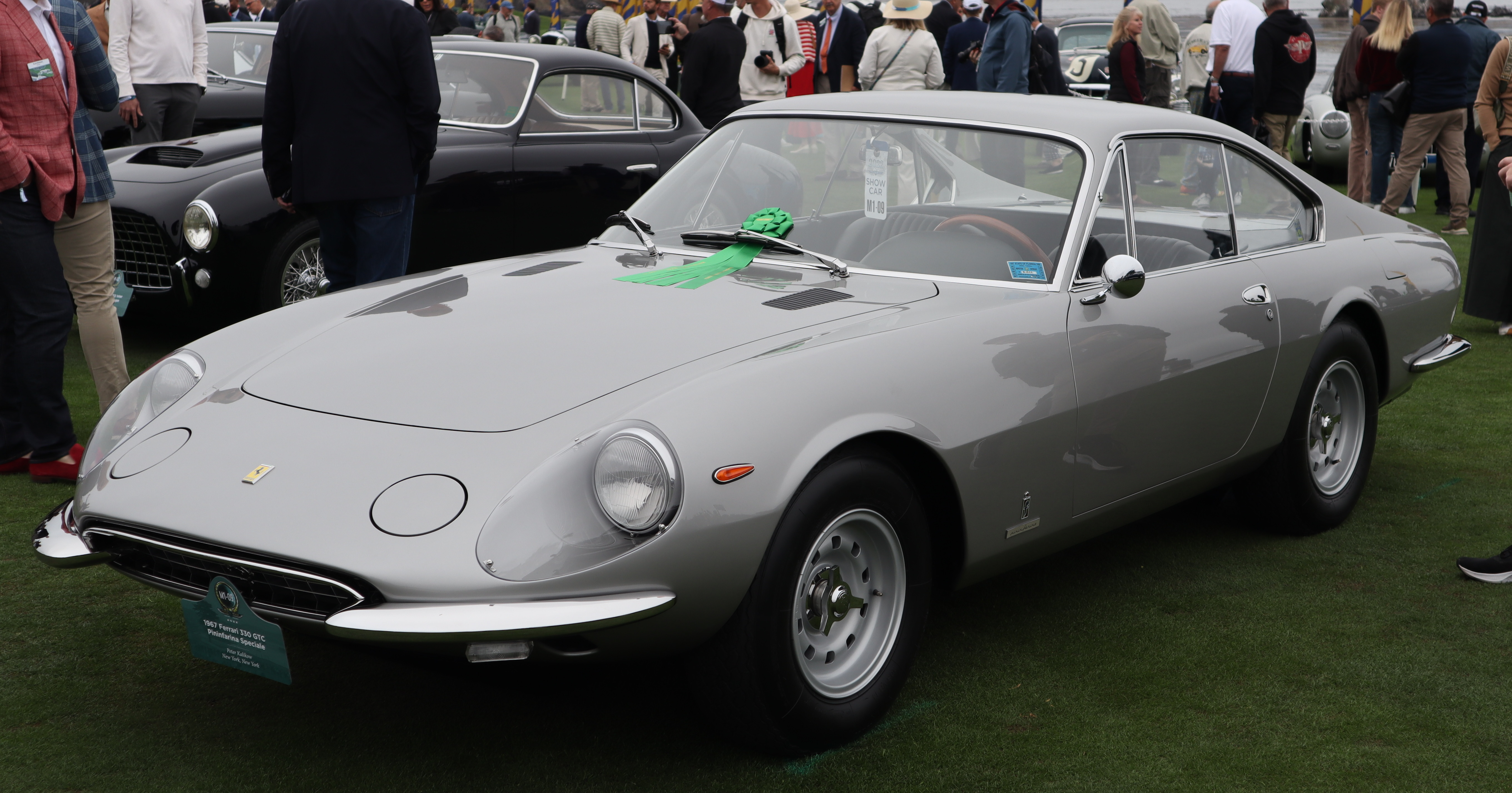
Ferrari 330 GTC Speciale

== 330 LMB ==
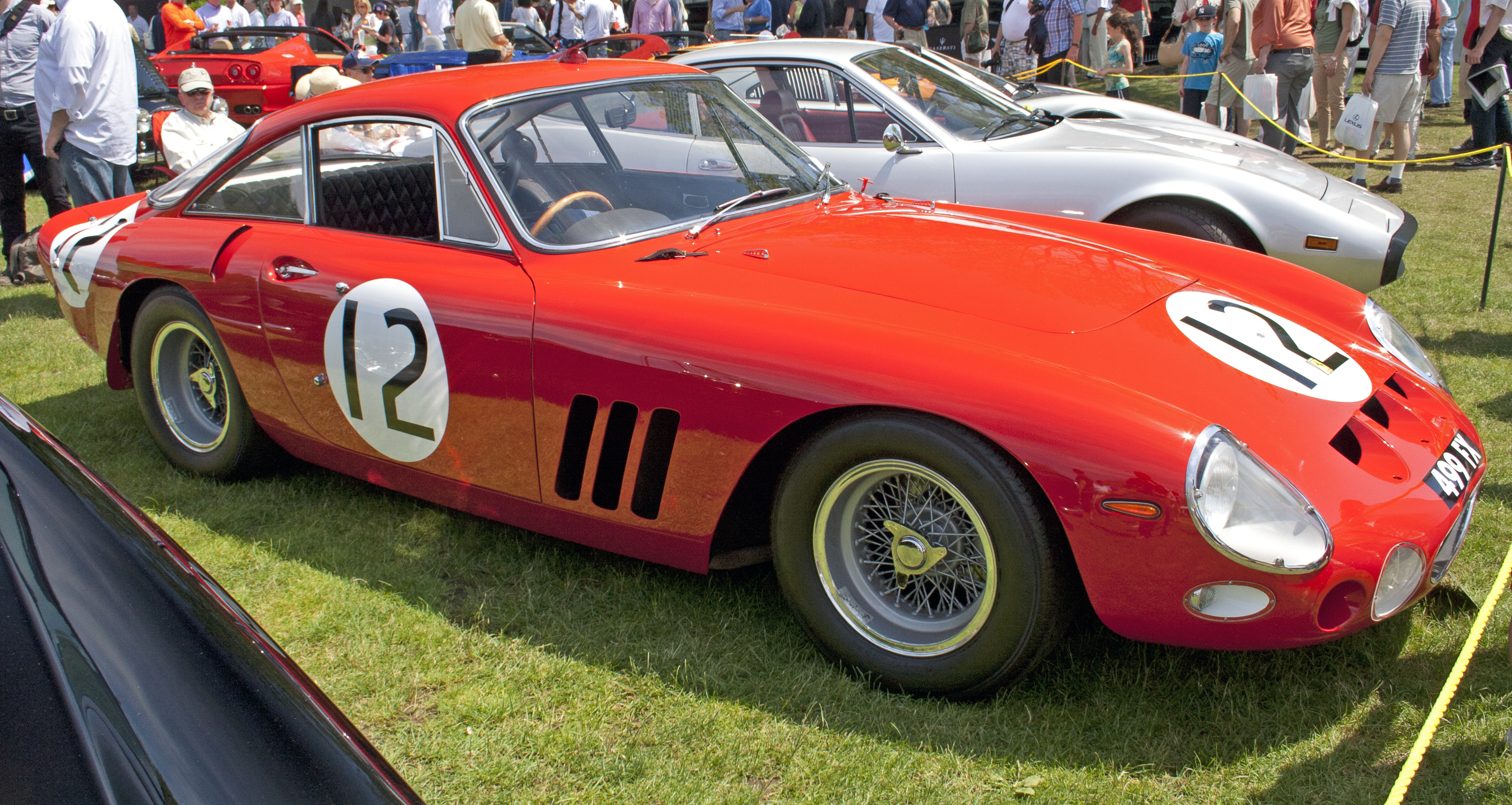
Ferrari 330 LM Berlinetta

Four 330 LMB Sports prototypes (with LMB standing for Le Mans Berlinetta) were built in 1963. This model is also known as the 330 LM. First presented in March 1963 alongside the mid-engined 250 P, they were essentially a development of the 250 GTOs and fitted with the 4-litre 330 engine, here rated at 390 hp (291 kW) at 7,500 rpm. Although the front is visually similar to the 250 GTOs, the main structure came from the 250 Lusso. The four 330 LMBs are distinct from the three 1962 330 GTOs; the 330 LMB chassis and body differed significantly from the 330 GTO, which was almost identical to the 250 GTO. The wheelbase, at 2,420 mm (95 in), was also 20 mm longer than either the Lusso's or the GTO's. The raised plates on the top of the rear fenders were necessary to clear the rear tires.

The 330 LMB did not see much racing, as Ferrari was moving over to the mid-engined layout for racing. One retired at Sebring 1963, while of three starters at Le Mans that year, two retired and the car of Jack Sears and Mike Salmon came in fifth. After this, the LMB saw no more works entries.

== 330 P ==
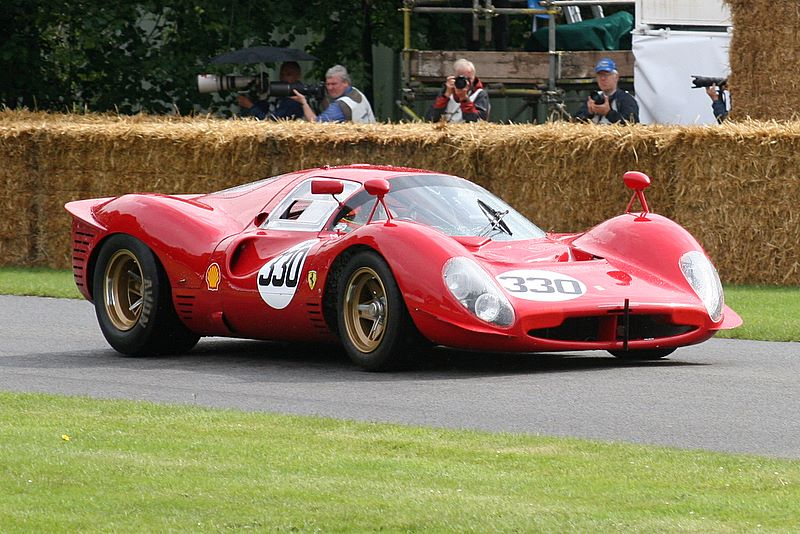
Ferrari 330 P3

Four models of mid-engined racing cars used the 330 engine and name as well — the 330 P/P2/P3/P4 range of the mid 1960s. The 330 P4 had 450 hp at 8000 rpm, which combined with its low weight of 792 kg (1746,06 lb) resulted in a top speed of 320 km/h (198.85 mph).
