= Ferrari 275 =

Ferrari 275 GTB, GTS, GTB/4, NART Spider
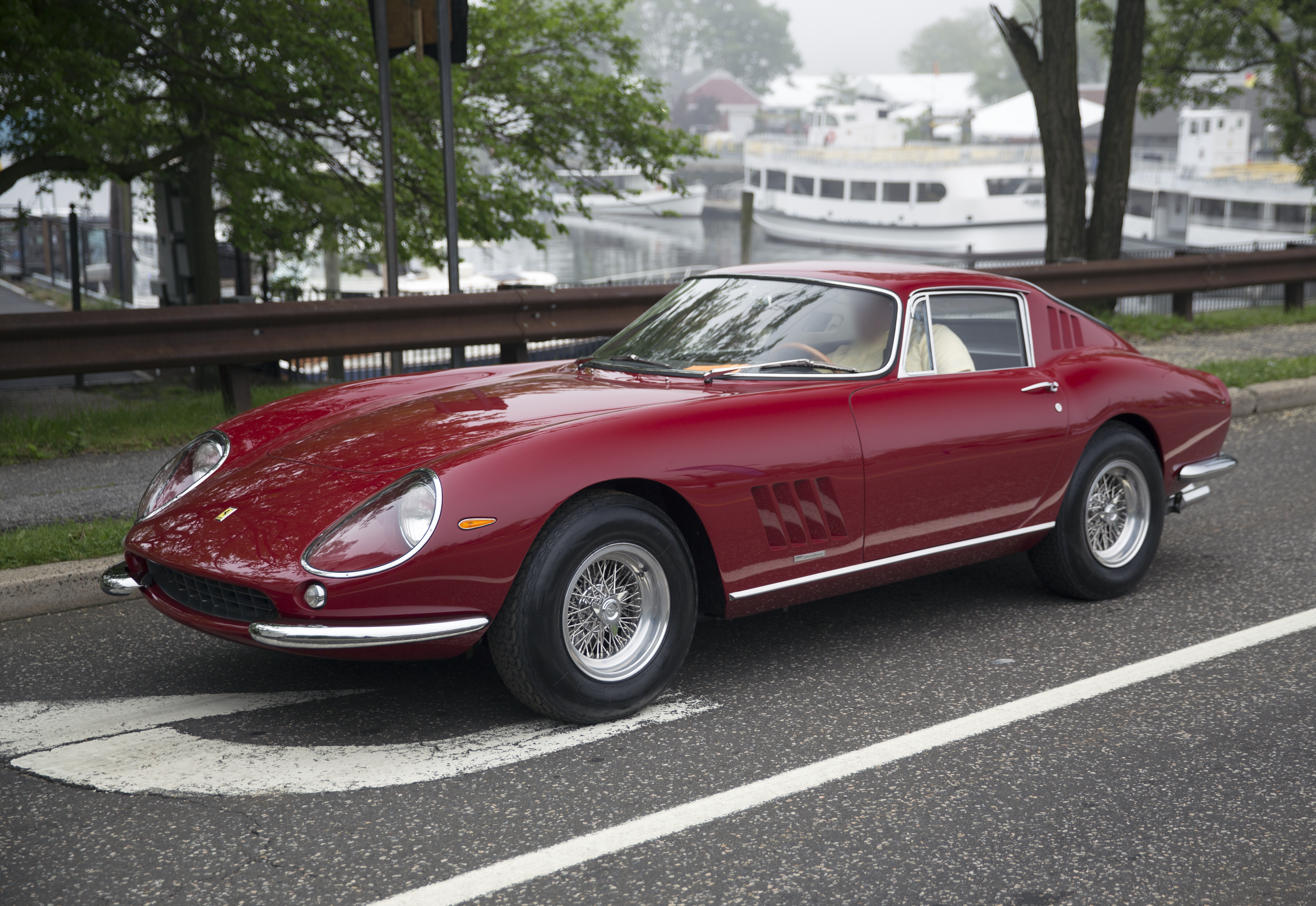
- 1966 Ferrari 275 GTB Series II

Overview
- Manufacturer: Ferrari
- Production: 1964–1966 (275 GTB, GTS); 1966–1968 (275 GTB/4); 1967 (275 GTS/4 NART Spyder)
- Assembly: Italy: Modena (Carrozzeria Scaglietti)
- Designer: Francesco Salamone at Pininfarina; Scaglietti (275 GTS/4 NART Spyder)

Body and chassis
- Class: Grand tourer
- Body style: 2-door berlinetta (GTB models); 2-door spider (GTS models)
- Layout: Front-mid engine, rear wheel drive

Powertrain
- Engine: 3.3 L Colombo V12 engine; with two overhead camshafts (275 GTB, GTB/C and GTS); or four overhead camshafts (275 GTB/4 and GTS/4 NART Spyder)
- Transmission: 5-speed manual transaxle with synchromesh

Dimensions
- Wheelbase: 2,400 mm (94.5 in)
- Curb weight: 1,300 kg (2,866 lb) (steel bodied 275 GTB/4); 1,112 kg (2,452 lb) (alloy-bodied 275 GTB/C)

Chronology
- Predecessor: Ferrari 250
- Successor: Ferrari 365 GTB/4; Ferrari 330 GTS

The Ferrari 275 is a series of front-engined V12-powered grand touring automobiles with two-seater coupé and spider bodies produced by Ferrari between 1964 and 1968. The first 275 series cars were powered by a 3.3 L (3286 cc) overhead camshaft Colombo 60° V12 engine producing 260–320 hp (190–240 kW). An updated 275 GTB/4 was introduced in 1966, with a revised four overhead camshaft engine producing 300 hp (220 kW). The 275 series were the first road-going Ferraris equipped with a transaxle and independent rear suspension.

Pininfarina designed the 275 coupé and spider bodies, while Scaglietti designed the 275 GTS/4 NART Spyder, of which only 10 were made.

Motor Trend Classic named the 275 GTB coupé/GTS spider as number three in their list of the ten "Greatest Ferraris of all time", and the 275 GTB/4 was named number seven on Sports Car International's 2004 list of Top Sports Cars of the 1960s. In a September 1967 road test, Road & Track described the NART Spyder as "the most satisfying sports car in the world."

== Two-cam models ==
All 275 coupé and spider models built from 1964 until the 275 GTB/4's introduction in 1966 were equipped with an overhead cam 3.3 litre V-12 engine (one camshaft for each cylinder bank). These early models are often called "two-cam" cars to distinguish them from later 275 models.

=== 275 GTB ===
The 275 GTB was a two-seat grand touring coupé produced between 1964 and 1966. The name of this model was derived from the engine's per-cylinder displacement of 275 cc and the Italian designation Gran Turismo Berlinetta.

The 275 GTB used a double overhead cam 3.3 litre Colombo-designed 60º V-12 engine designated Tipo 213. This engine was the final development of the Colombo V12, with a stroke of 58.8 mm and a bore of 77 mm. The internal parts of the engine were derived from those used in other Ferrari models including the 250 GTE 2+2, 250 Lusso and 250 GTO. Three twin-choke Weber 40 DCZ 6 or 40 DFI 1 carburetors were equipped as standard. Power was claimed to be 280 horsepower (210 kW) at 7600 rpm, but provided closer to 240-250 hp (190 kW) in actual use. A factory option of six twin-choke Weber 40 DCN carburetors was also available, which Ferrari claimed provided 320 hp (240 kW) at 7500 rpm although the actual increase in power over the three-Weber setup was likely only 20-25 hp. The rear wheels were driven by a 5-speed manual transaxle with Porsche-style synchromesh and a limited-slip differential. This was the first time a transaxle was used on a Ferrari production road car, although they were used on some earlier Ferrari competition models such as the 250 Testa Rossa.

The 275 chassis was a conventional ladder frame design fabricated from oval-section steel tube. Mike Parkes had a major role in developing the 275's suspension, which employed many technologies tested in earlier Ferrari racing cars such as the 250 TR and 250 LM. Double wishbone independent suspension was used at all four wheels along with Koni shock absorbers and coil springs. The 275's four-wheel independent suspension was a first for Ferrari road cars, which were previously equipped with live rear axles. Dunlop disc brakes were equipped at all four wheels, although even during the mid 1960s they were considered inadequate due to small size, lack of ventilated discs, and an underpowered servo and caliper. Cast magnesium 14 inch diameter wheels were standard equipment, with Borrani wire wheels available as a factory option, both wheel options came fitted with Pirelli 205VR14 Cinturato CN72 tyres.

The 275 engine was initially mounted to the chassis at four points, each insulated by a thin rubber pad in road cars or an aluminium spacer in competition versions. The transaxle was similarly mounted to the rear of the chassis at three points. Engine and transaxle were connected via a rigid drive shaft, supported by a central bearing. This mounting arrangement allowed the engine and transaxle to act as stressed members of the chassis. This improved overall rigidity, but caused increased noise and vibration and required careful alignment. At the end of 1965, the driveshaft was revised with the addition of CV joints at either end, which allowed some flexibility and misalignment between the engine and transmission. This system was retrofitted to some earlier production cars and was also installed in some early 1966 production series two "long nose" cars prior to the introduction of the torque tube.

The coupé body was designed by Pininfarina and manufactured by Scaglietti. The standard 275 GTB body was fabricated in steel with aluminium alloy doors, hood and trunk lid. At least 72 cars were built with a lightweight all-aluminium body, which was an extra-cost option from the factory.

A series two, or "long-nose" version of the 275 GTB was introduced in 1966. The second series 275 GTB incorporated a number of mechanical and cosmetic changes. A torque tube was installed between the engine and transaxle in order to relieve stress on the drive shaft and central support bearing. The engine and transaxle were revised to use two chassis attachment points each, rather than the four engine mounts and three transaxle mounts used on earlier cars. As a result, the engine and transaxle were now a rigid unit, flexibly suspended within the chassis by a total of four points. As the engine/transaxle were no longer stressed members, the chassis was slightly softer and noise/vibration issues seen on series I cars were improved. The front bodywork was lowered and lengthened and the front air intake was reduced in size, which improved aerodynamic characteristics and reduced high-speed instability. This was the most visible change between the two series, resulting in the common informal designation of series I cars as "short nose" and series II as "long nose." The rear window was enlarged to improve visibility. In order to improve luggage space, the fuel filler, fuel tanks and spare tyre were relocated and the trunk hinges were changed from internal to externally-mounted.

A total of 442 of the 275 GTB road cars were produced between fall 1964 and summer 1966, including 236 Series I "short-nose" and 206 Series II "long-nose" cars.

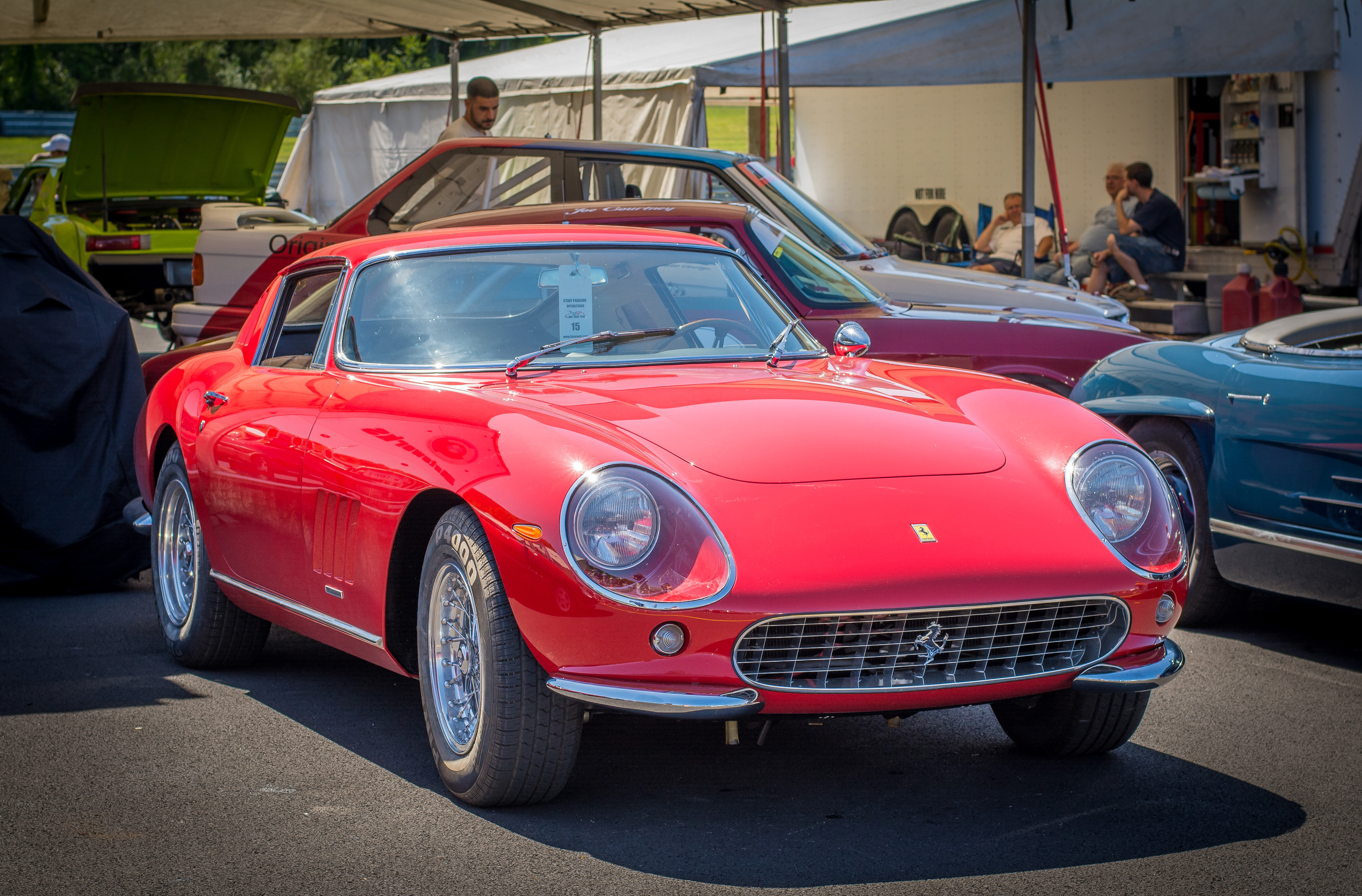
1965 Ferrari 275 GTB, Series I "short nose"

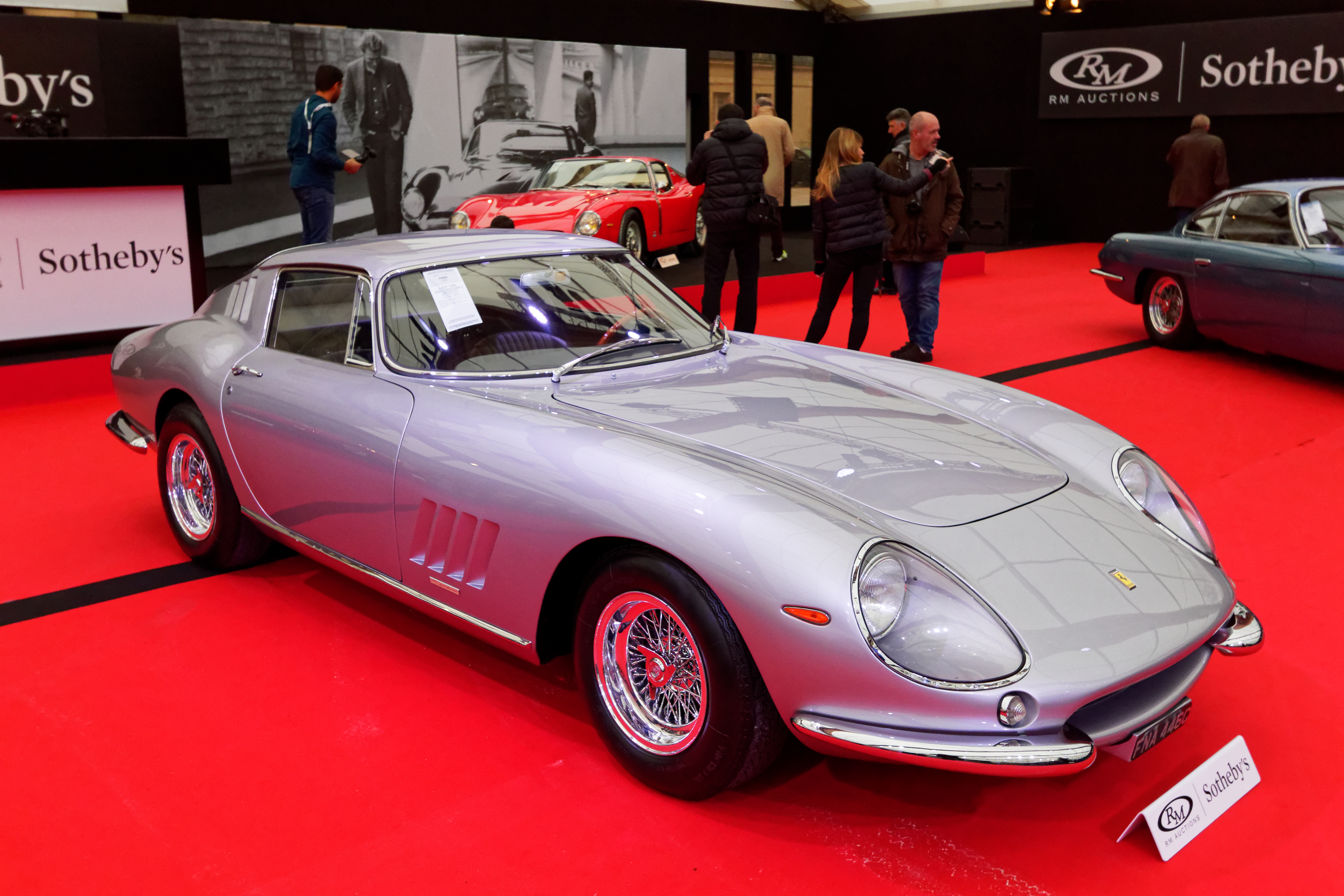
275 GTB, Series II "long nose" with optional aluminium alloy bodywork

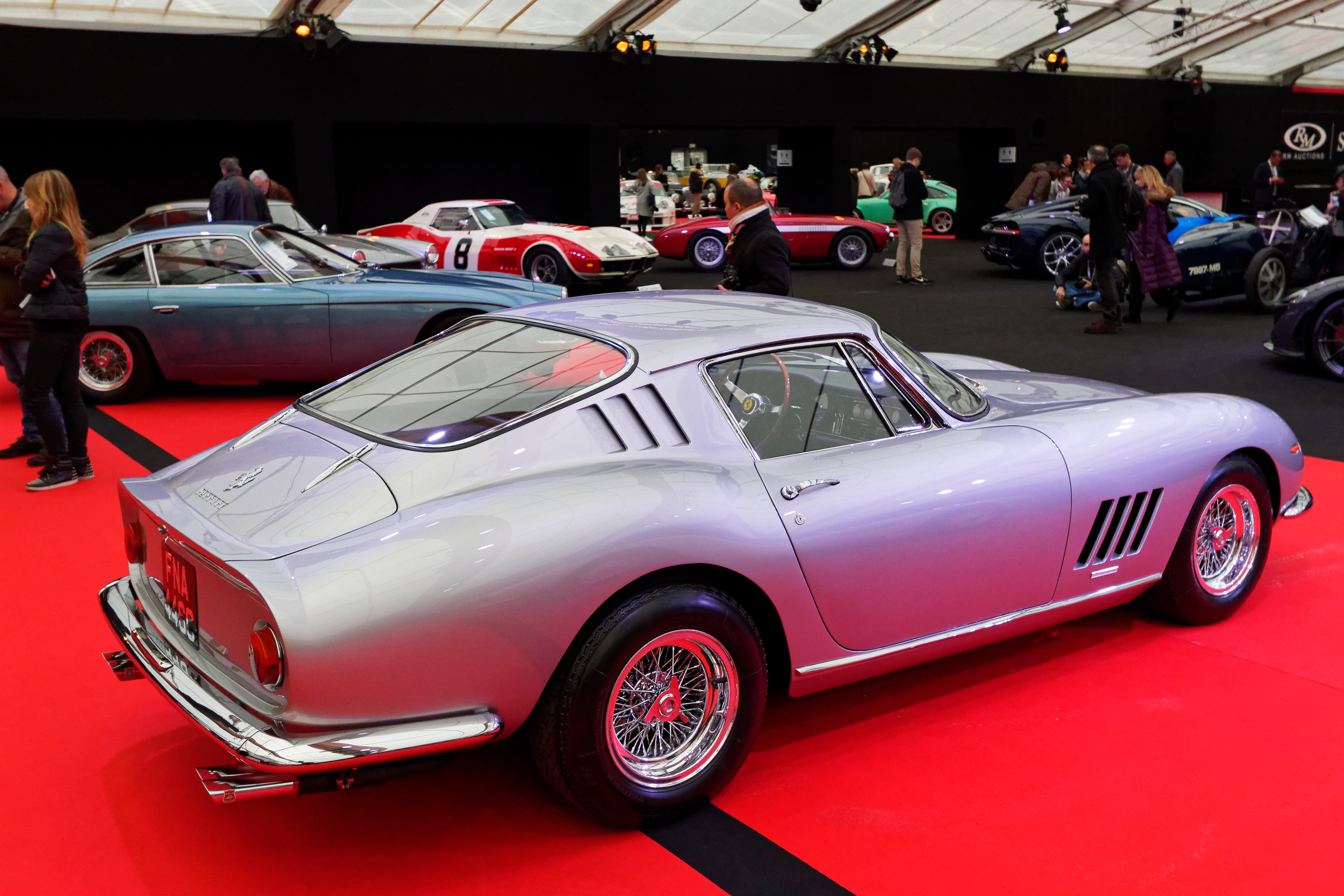
Note the B-pillar and roof panel gap denoting alloy bodywork

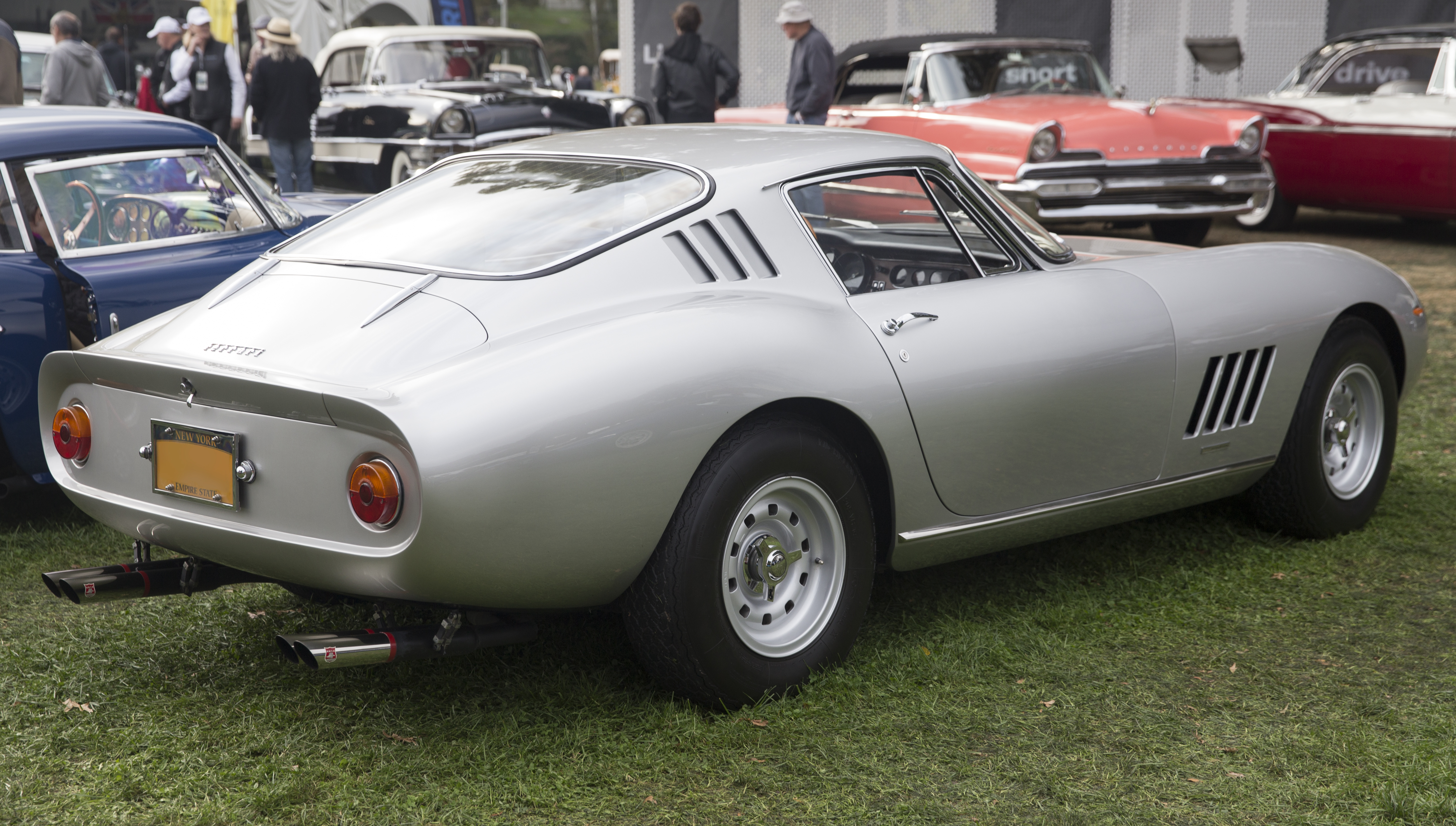
Rear view of 275 GTB Series II (Note the B-pillar and roof smooth connection of steel bodywork)

=== Competition versions ===
From 1964 to 1966, Ferrari developed competition versions of the 275 GTB for use in Grand Touring-class sports car racing. Initial development of a 275 GTB-based racing car was motivated by a specific set of circumstances around Ferrari's racing activities during 1964. The 1962–1963 250 GTO was extremely successful in GT-class racing but was nearing obsolescence in 1964. The 250 GTO's planned successor, the 250 LM, was introduced to the public in November 1963, but the Fédération Internationale de l'Automobile (FIA) refused to homologate it for GT-class racing. In response, Ferrari decided to prepare for the 1964 season by developing in parallel both an updated 250 GTO (called the series II or GTO64) and a competition version of the 275 GTB. Between 1964 and 1966, Ferrari created three distinct series of 275 GTB-based competition cars, the purpose-built 1964/65 275 GTB Competizione Speciale (also known as the 275 GTB/C Speciale), a 1965 group of modified production 275 GTB "customer competition" cars for independent racing teams, and the final development, the purpose-built 1966 275 GTB/C.

==== 275 GTB Competizione Speciale ====
The first racing version of the 275 was the 275 GTB Competizione Speciale (or 275 GTB/C Speciale). Designed under the supervision of Mauro Forghieri, this model was intended to succeed the 250 GTO as Ferrari's GT-class entry during the 1965 racing season. Ferrari constructed four cars of this type, three of which were manufactured between late 1964 and early 1965, while the fourth was completed in 1966. These cars were equipped with Tipo 213 engines tuned to 250 LM specification, producing approximately 290-305 bhp (227 kW). The extra-thin-gauge alloy bodywork (designed by Pininfarina and built by Scaglietti) was significantly different from the production 275 GTB, with a more streamlined shape similar to the 250 GTO and the 330 LMB. All four cars had slightly differing hand-built bodywork, possibly due to ongoing aerodynamic experimentation by Ferrari engineers. The chassis was a lightweight version of the production Tipo 563 chassis using smaller diameter tubing. Additional weight reduction was accomplished by drilling holes in interior panels, Plexiglas windows, and the use of magnesium castings for parts of the engine and transaxle. The owner of one 275 GTB/C Speciale (chassis 6885) estimated the curb weight as approximately 1,900 pounds (860 kg).

The Fédération Internationale de l'Automobile (FIA) at first refused to homologate the model for the GT class but settled on a compromise when Enzo Ferrari threatened to abandon competing in the GT class. Due to this delay, only one 275 GTB/C Speciale (chassis 6885) raced during the 1965 season. This car competed at the 1965 Targa Florio, where was driven by Bruno Deserti and Giampiero Biscaldi but failed to finish. The car placed 13th overall at the 1965 1000km Nürburgring, driven by Biscaldi and Giancarlo Baghetti. It finished 3rd overall at the 1965 24 Hours of Le Mans, where it was driven by Willy Mairesse and Jean Blaton (under the name "Beurlys") for Ecurie Francorchamps. Following Le Mans, the car placed 11th overall at the 1965 500 km of Bridgehampton and won the 1965 Nassau Tourist Trophy.

Due to its role as a 250 GTO successor and its visual similarities with that model, the 275 GTB/C Speciale is sometimes referred to as the "GTO '65", although this was never an official factory designation.

A 1964 275 GTB/C Speciale (chassis 06701) was sold in 2014 by RM Sotheby's at their California auction for $26,400,000.

==== 275 GTB customer competition cars ====
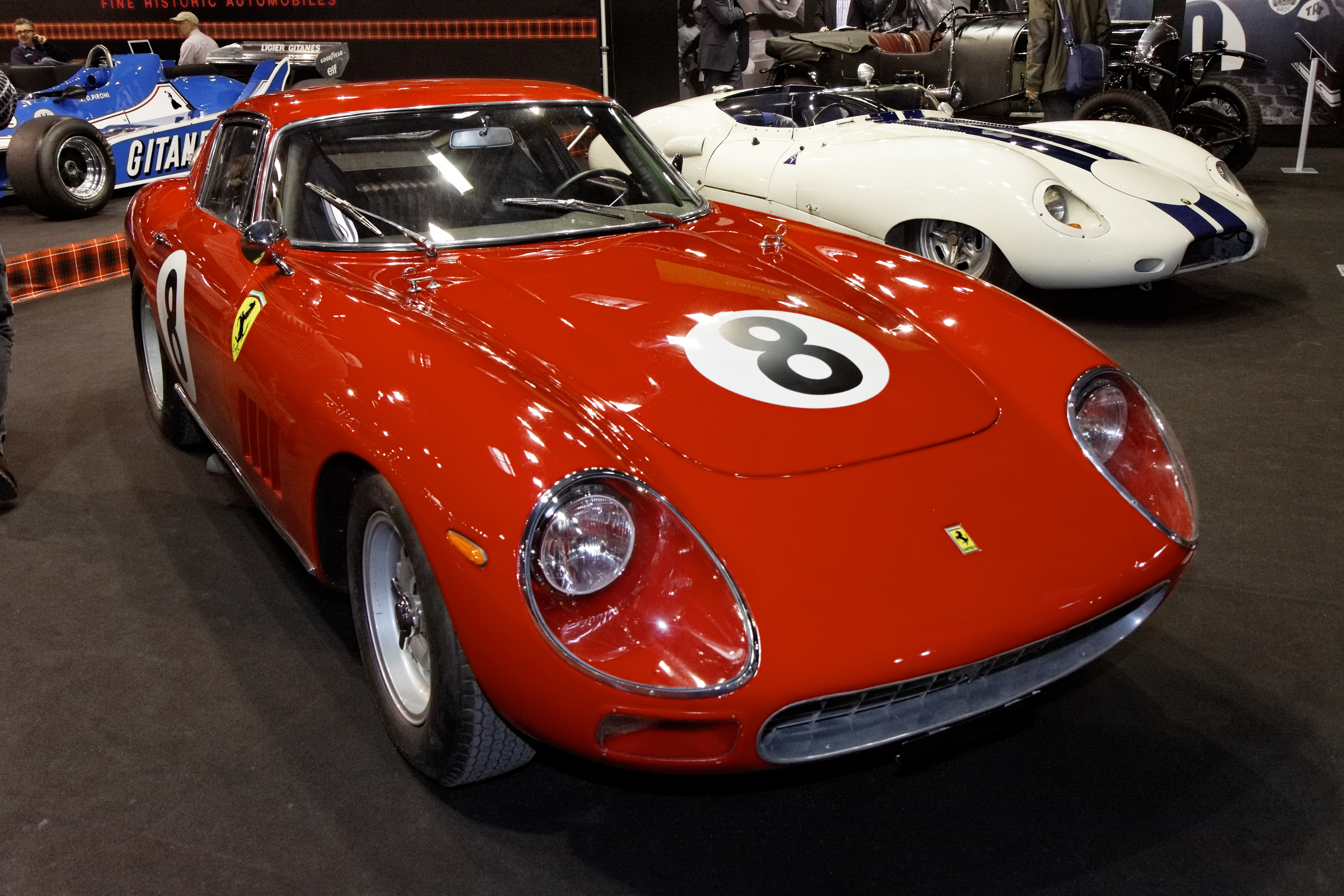
1965 275 GTB customer competition version, chassis 07437

Following the creation of the 275 GTB/C Speciale and the subsequent homologation struggles, Ferrari decided to create a less-radical competition 275 GTB to be sold to private racing teams. Ten cars of this type were produced. These customer competition (or in Italian "competizione clienti") cars were very similar to the production 275 GTB, differing only in the alloy bodywork, extra venting, added exterior fuel fillers and expanded capacity fuel tanks. The engine was a Tipo 213 unit with 6 carburetors, the same as fitted to production road-going 275 GTBs. These customer-competition 275 GTBs were created both to test the market for this type of GT racing car and as a gesture of compliance to the FIA, in hope of positively influencing the homologation process.

==== 275 GTB/C ====
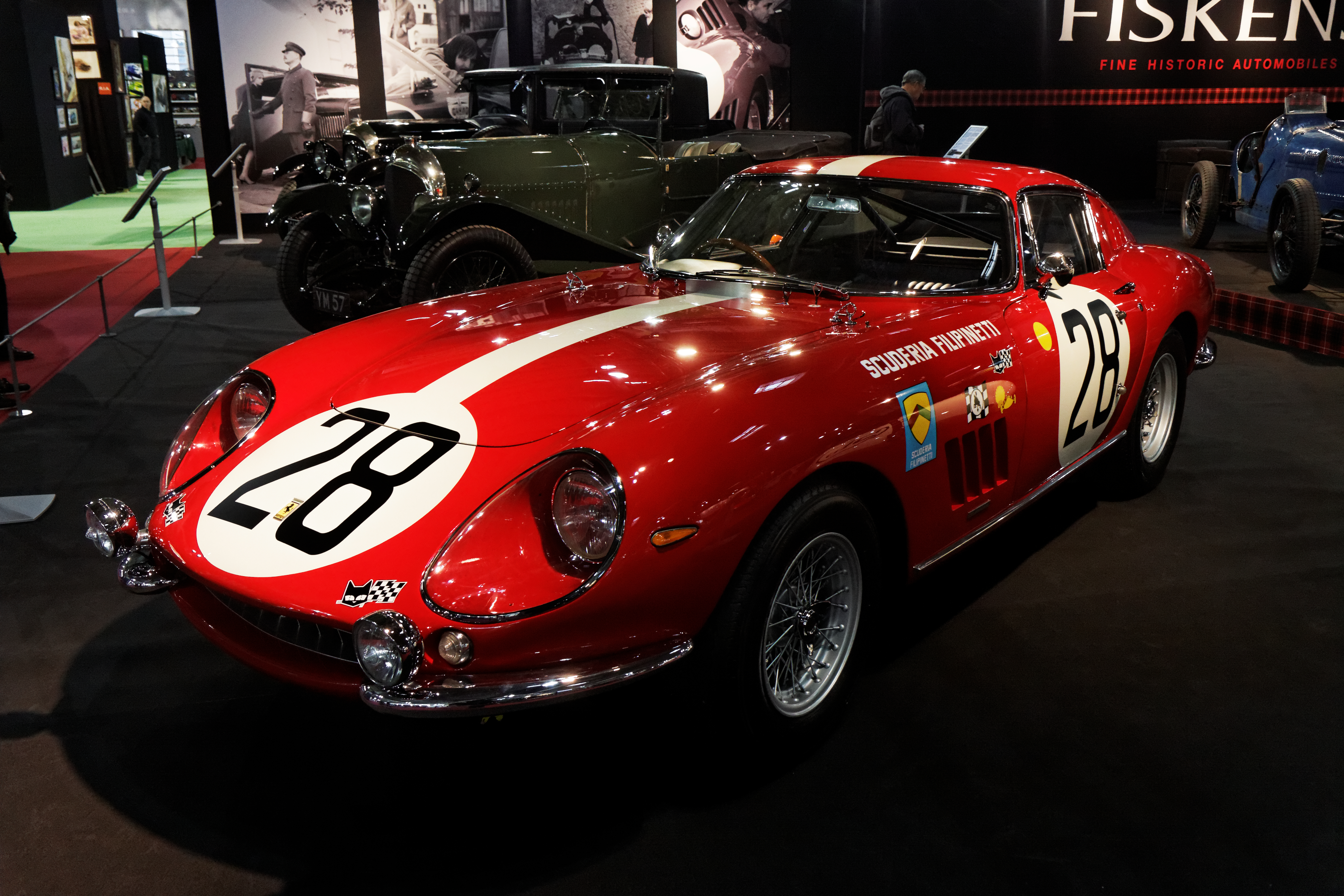
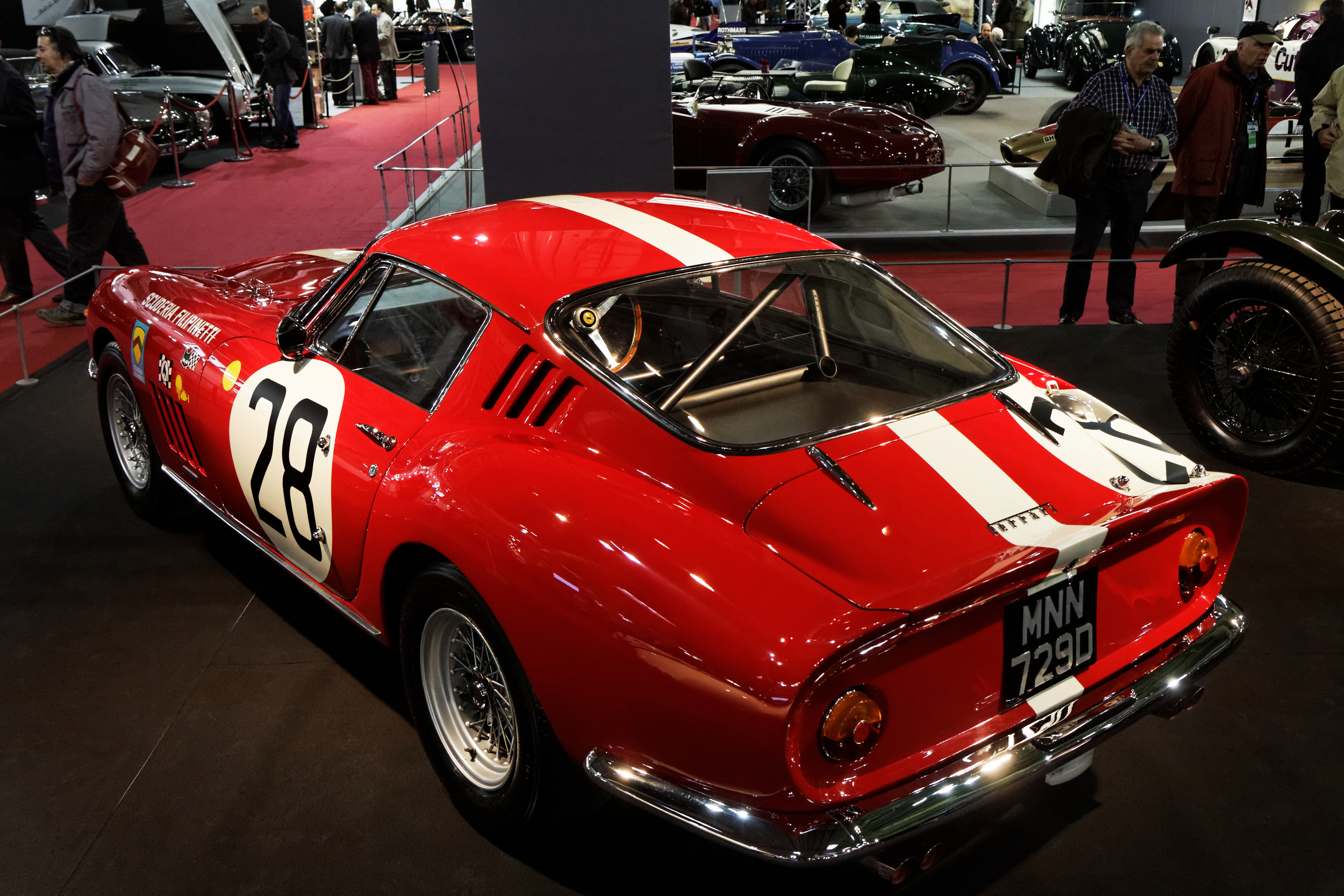
1966 275 GTB/C, chassis 09079

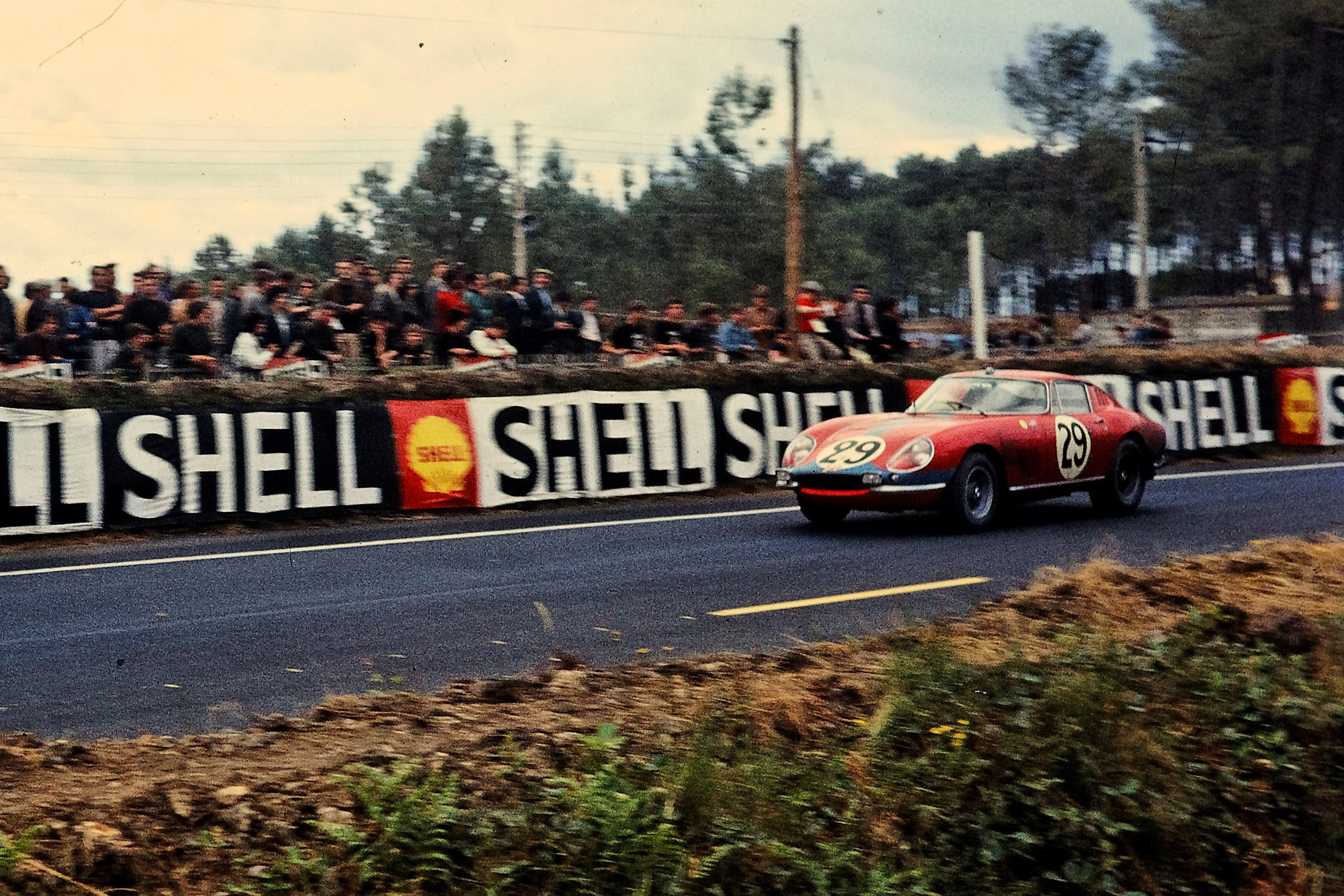
The 275 GTB/C of Roy Pike and Piers Courage at the 1966 24 Hours of Le Mans.

For the 1966 season, Ferrari built a new series of 12 lightweight 275 GTB/C racing cars. Even though they outwardly resembled the road-going 275 GTB, the 275 GTB/C was thoroughly revised by Mauro Forghieri and his Scuderia Ferrari engineering team and differed from both the 275 GTB production car and earlier 275 GTB competition cars. Every panel of the body was altered and substantial mechanical changes were made. All 12 were constructed in 1966 between the end of the 275 GTB (two cam) production run and the start of the 275 GTB/4 (four cam) production run.

Forghieri designed a special super-lightweight steel and aluminium version of the 275 GTB chassis, designated Tipo 590 A. The 4-wheel independent suspension was the same design as on the production 275 GTB, but used different shock absorber valving and stiffer springs. The disc brakes were also the same as those used on the production 275 GTB, but with quick-change racing brake pads.

The body appeared superficially very similar to that of the production 275 GTB series II "long nose", but in fact was a completely new lightweight version constructed by Scaglietti. All body panels were changed, including wider front and rear fenders and a slightly shorter nose. The body was constructed from .028 in (0.71 mm) thick aluminium panels joined with rivets. This method of construction allowed easy replacement of body panels after an accident. The body panels were approximately half as thick as the ones used on the 250 GTO and the Shelby Cobra. This made the body lightweight but extremely fragile—even leaning on a 275 GTB/C would dent it. The entire rear section was reinforced by fiberglass to prevent it from flexing at the slightest impact. The 275 GTB/C was equipped with bumpers visually similar to those on the road version, but they were made of much thinner material. The rear bumper lacked an internal supporting subframe and was simply fastened to the bodywork sheetmetal. Other weight-saving measures included removal of cooling fans, holes drilled in many internal panels and frames, plexiglass side and rear windows, thin fiberglass floor panels, and magnesium-framed seats. A 275 GTB/C fully equipped with fluids, spare tyre and tool kit weighs 2,452 lb (1,112 kg). In race trim without spare and tool kit, it can weigh less than 2,350 lb (1,070 kg), a savings of over 150 kg (331 lb) compared to the alloy bodied road cars.

Similar to the four 'Competizione Speciales', the 275 GTB/C was powered by a Tipo 213 V12 tuned to 250 LM specification with a special crankshaft, piston, camshaft connecting rods and sodium-filled Nimonic valves. Many engine castings were made from the lightweight magnesium alloy Elektron. Due to an apparent clerical error, Ferrari did not report to the FIA that the production 275 GTB had a six carburetor option, so only a three carburetor engine could be homologated. In order to make up the loss of power from using only three carburetors, Weber constructed the 40 DF13 carburetor. These replaced the six Weber 38 DCN carburetors used on the 250 LM and were unique to the 275 GTB/C. A dry sump lubrication system was also added, allowing the engine to sit lower in the chassis. The Tipo 213 engine in this competition specification produced 275-282 hp (210 kW) at 7500 rpm.

The 275 GTB/C did not use the torque tube driveshaft configuration introduced with the 275 GTB series II, instead using a series I-style open driveshaft which made clutch changes easier during endurance races.The clutch itself was strengthened for the added stresses of racing. The transaxle was a similar design to the road version, but used a lightweight magnesium case, close ratio gears, a strengthened ZF limited slip differential and needle bearings (instead of plain bearings) between the gears and the main shaft.

The 275 GTB/C was fitted with specially-made Borrani wire wheels, sized 7" x 15" in front and 7.5" x 15" in the rear. These wheels were fitted with Dunlop's latest "M series" racing tyres. It was this combination that would prove to be the weak spot of the 275 GTB/C; the tyres had so much grip that they could overstress and break the spokes on the wheels. This resulted in several crashes during competition. After the 275 GTB/C, no competition Ferrari would be fitted with wire wheels again. Two of the twelve 275 GTB/Cs built were sold for street use. Unlike the race cars, these street cars were fitted with standard 275 GTB-style alloy wheels with Pirelli tyres.

After its introduction in 1966, the 275 GTB/C was raced by several independent racing teams with varying degrees of Ferrari factory support, including NART, Maranello Concessionaires, Scuderia Filipinetti, and Ecurie Francorchamps. Three 275 GTB/Cs were entered in the 1966 24 Hours of Le Mans, two of which finished. The Maranello Concessionaires-entered 275 GTB/C (chassis 09035) driven by Roy Pike and Piers Courage finished 8th overall and 1st in class, while the Ecurie Francorchamps 275 GTB/C (chassis 09027) driven by Claude Dubois and Pierre Noblet finished 10th overall and 2nd in class. Other notable victories include a 1st in class at the 1967 Targa Florio, driven by Tullio Sergio Marchesi. Marchesi went on to win the 1966 and 1967 Italian GT Championships driving 275 GTB/C chassis 09007.

=== 275 GTS ===
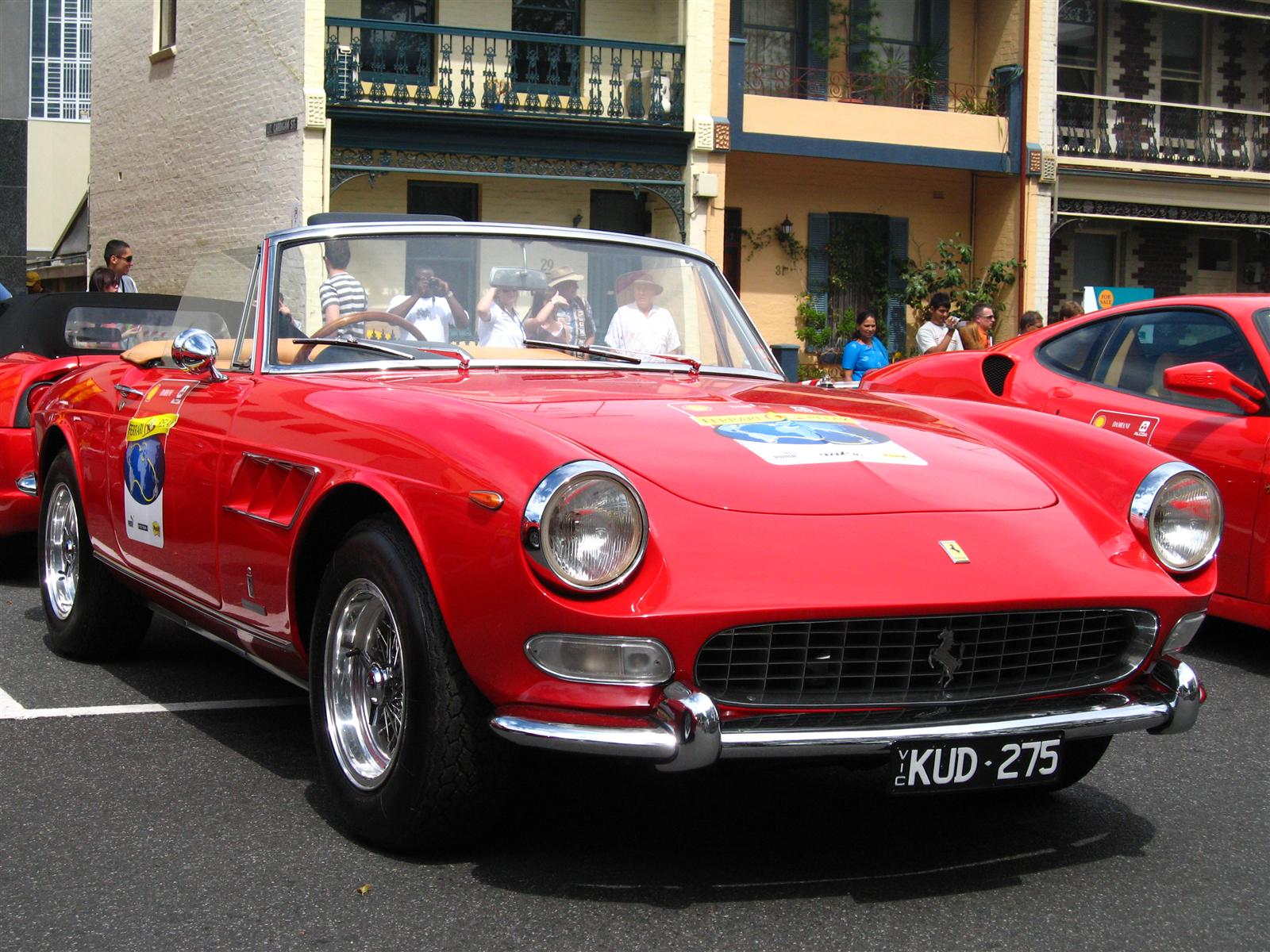
275 GTS

The 275 GTS was a two-seat grand touring spider produced from 1964 to 1966. The 275 GTS was introduced at the same time as the 275 GTB and was mechanically almost identical, sharing the 3.3 litre V12, transaxle, chassis and fully independent suspension. Ferrari reported that the engine fitted to the 275 GTS produced 260 bhp (190 kW). This was less than the reported 280 bhp produced by the 275 GTB, although there was likely no difference in engines between the models. The 275 GTS was never equipped with a torque tube, unlike the 275 GTB series II. This model was fitted with 205Vr15 Pirelli Cinturato CN72 tyres on Borrani wire wheels.

The all steel 275 GTS body was designed and manufactured by Pininfarina. Its appearance was entirely different than that of the 275 GTB coupé, with a shorter front hood, smaller uncovered headlights, and overall balanced proportions suggesting earlier 250 Pininfarina Cabriolet models. All 275 GTS were equipped with a folding cloth convertible top and an additional removable hard top was a factory option.

Ferrari produced a total of 200 275 GTS between late 1964 and early 1966, including 19 in right hand drive. The 275 GTS was replaced in 1966 by the 330 GTS, leaving no 3.3 L spider in the range until the creation of the 275 GTB/4 NART Spider.

== Four-cam models ==
The 275 GTB/4 and GTS/4 NART spyder models made up the final production run of the 275 series, between 1966 and 1968. They were equipped with a four overhead cam 3.3 litre V-12 engine, a development of the double overhead cam 275 engine used from 1964–1966. The later 275 models are often called "four-cam" cars to distinguish them from earlier 275 models.

=== 275 GTB/4 ===
Introduced at the Paris Motor Show in October 1966, the 275 GTB/4 (or 4-cam) used the same basic platform as the early 275 GTB with mostly mechanical improvements. The Scaglietti-built bodywork was largely the same as the series II "long-nose" 275 GTB, with the most visible difference being an added hood bulge with creased edges. Campagnolo magnesium alloy wheels sized 14x7 were standard equipment, while traditional Borrani wire wheels were a special-order option.

The engine was the Tipo 226 3285.72 cc Colombo V12, derived from the earlier Tipo 213 275 engine with two valves per cylinder, but now upgraded with four overhead camshafts and six Weber 40 DCN carburetors as standard. This engine produced a claimed 300 hp (220 kW). In a departure from previous Ferrari designs, the valve angle was reduced three degrees to 54° for a more-compact head. The dual camshafts also allowed the valves to be aligned perpendicular to the camshaft instead of offset as in SOHC engines. The engine used a dry-sump lubrication system with a large 17 qt (16 L) capacity.

Improvements from the series II 275 GTB were carried over to the 275 GTB/4, including the torque tube connecting the engine and transmission. In addition to the upgraded engine, the 275 GTB/4 had several minor improvements to the cooling system, exhaust and suspension.

The 275 GTB/4 had a claimed top speed of 268 km/h (167 mph). A total of 330 were produced from 1966 to 1968.

In 2004, Sports Car International named the 275 GTB/4 number seven on the list of Top Sports Cars of the 1960s.

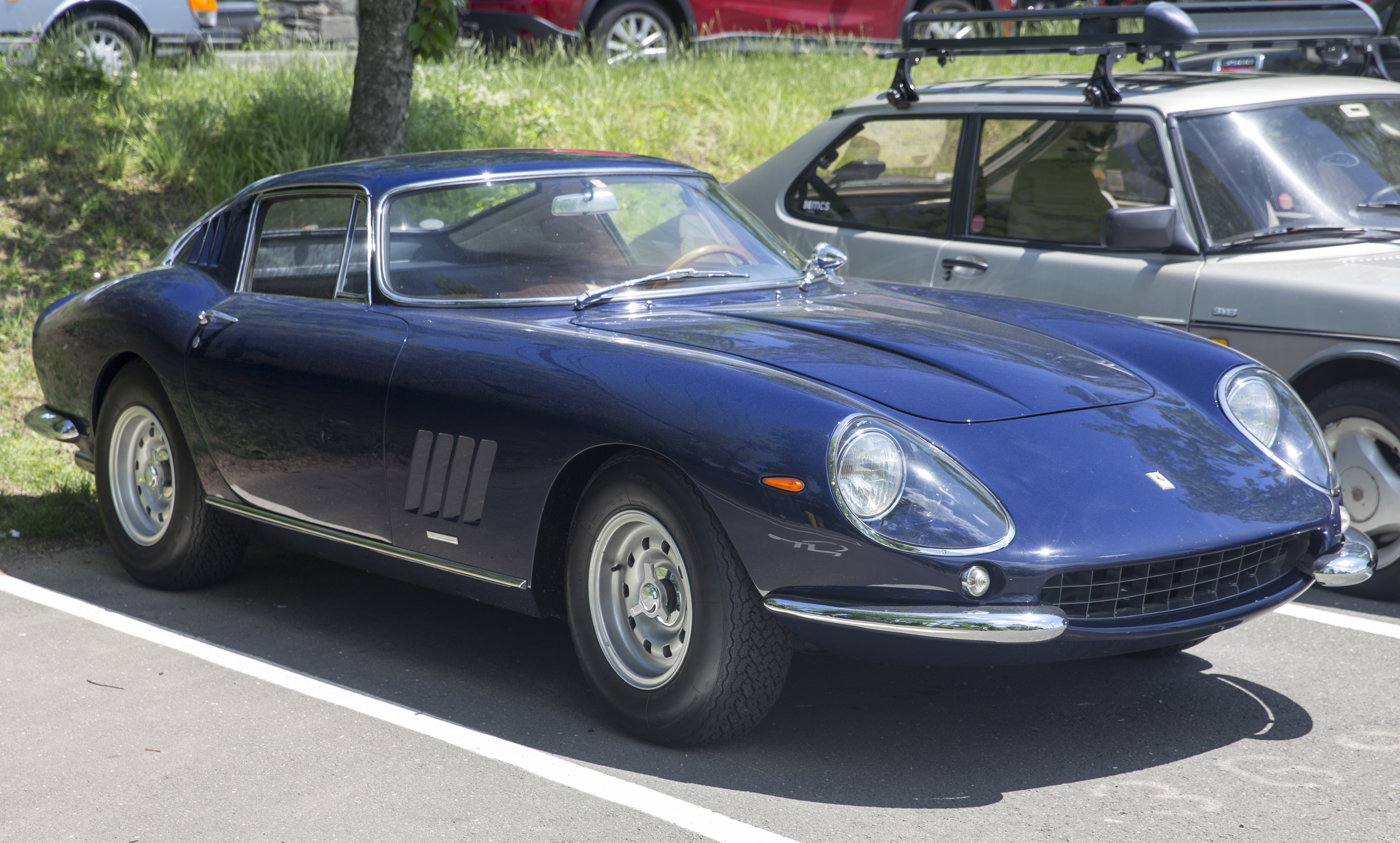
1967 275 GTB/4

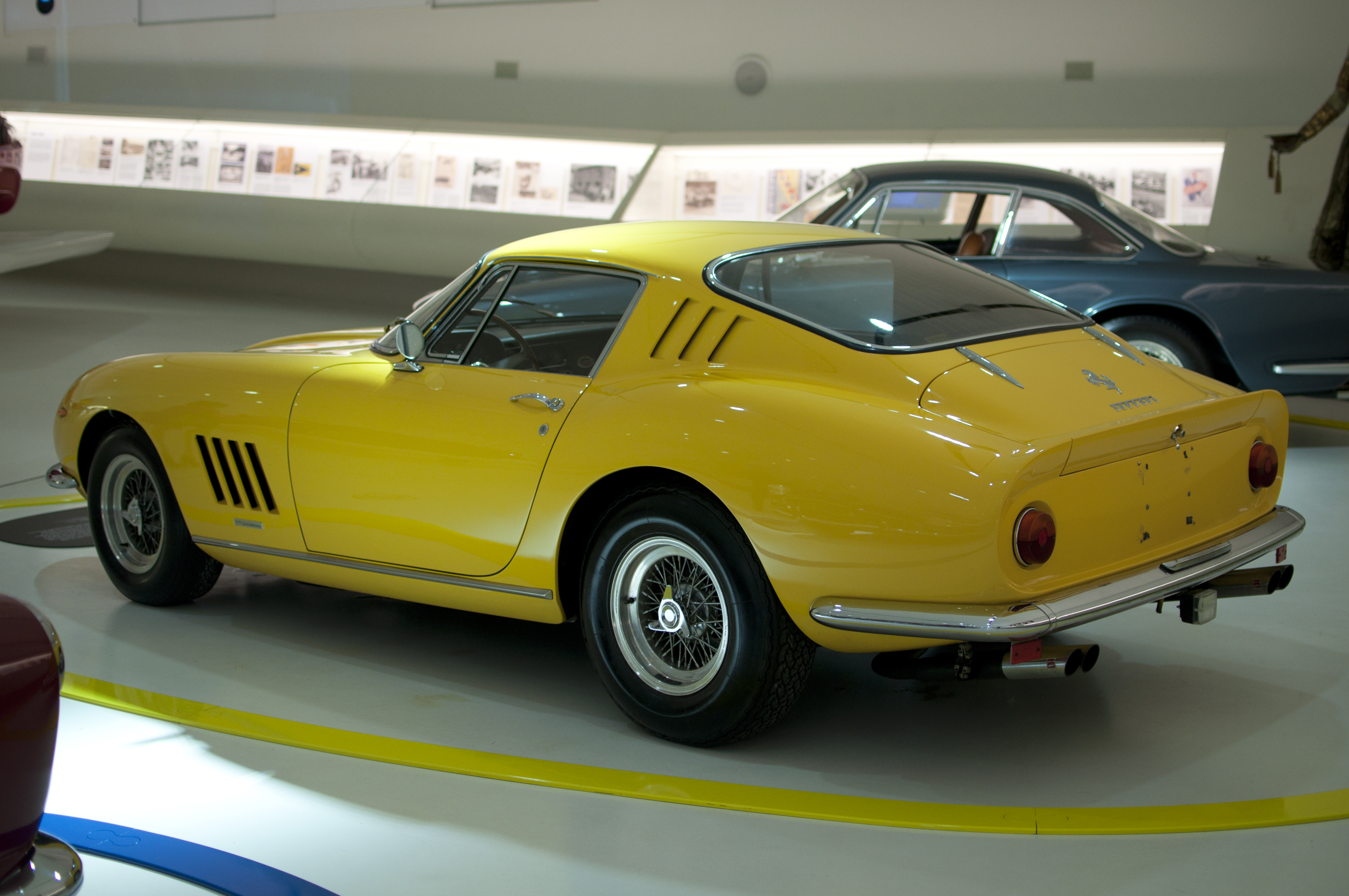
275 GTB/4 at the Museo Casa Enzo Ferrari

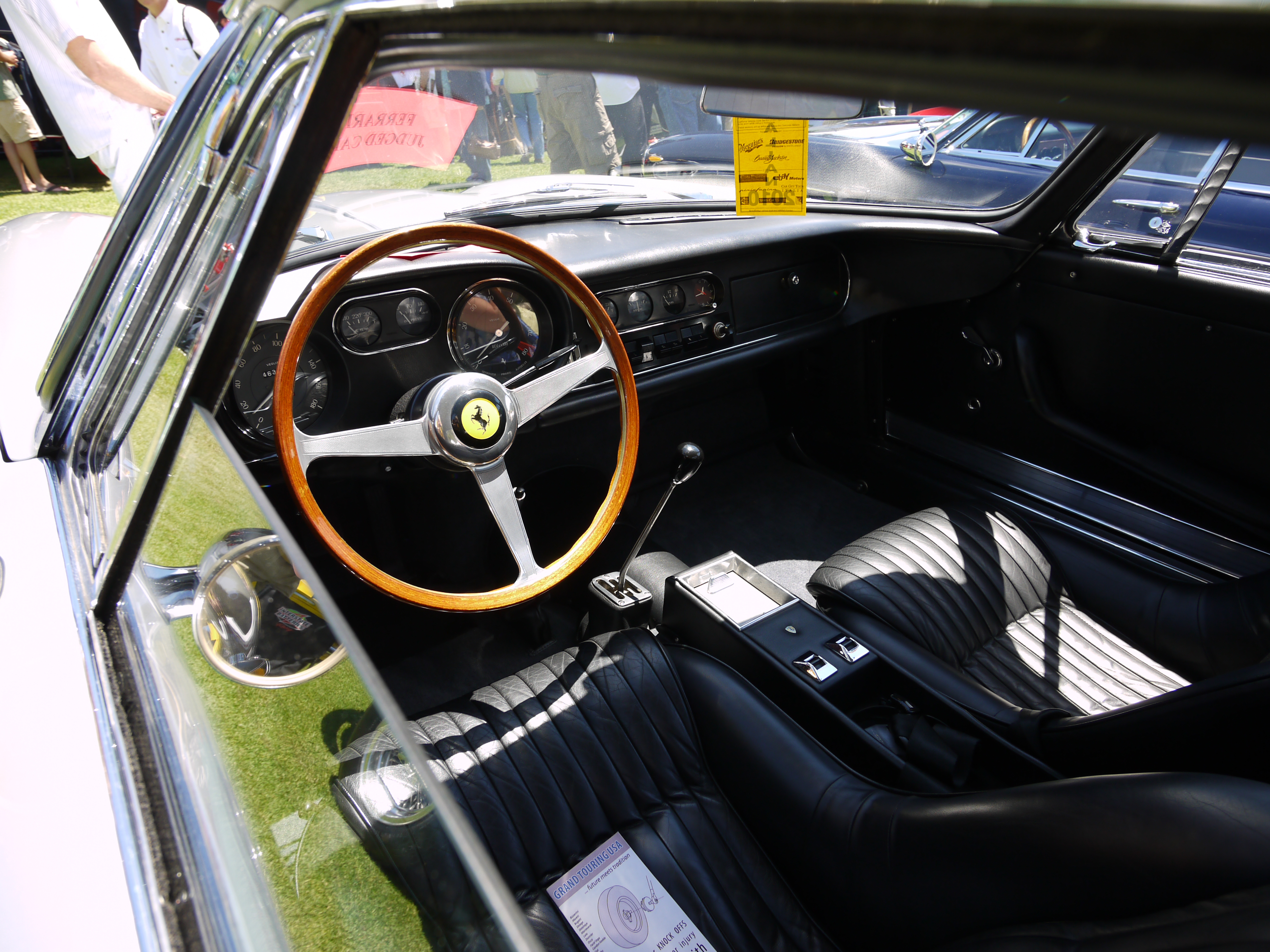
1967 275 GTB/4 interior

=== 275 GTB/4S NART Spider ===
1967 275 GTB/4S NART Spider
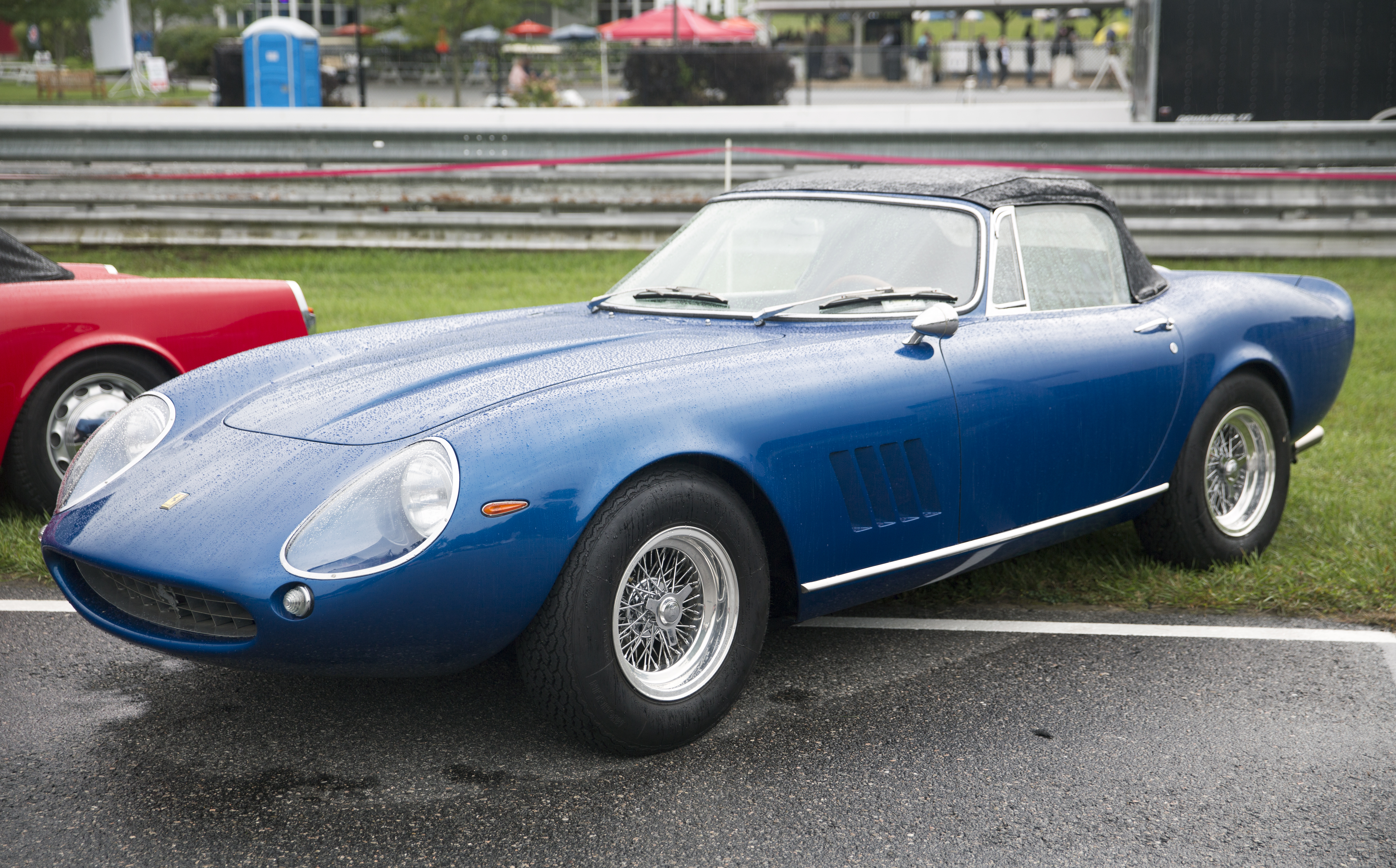
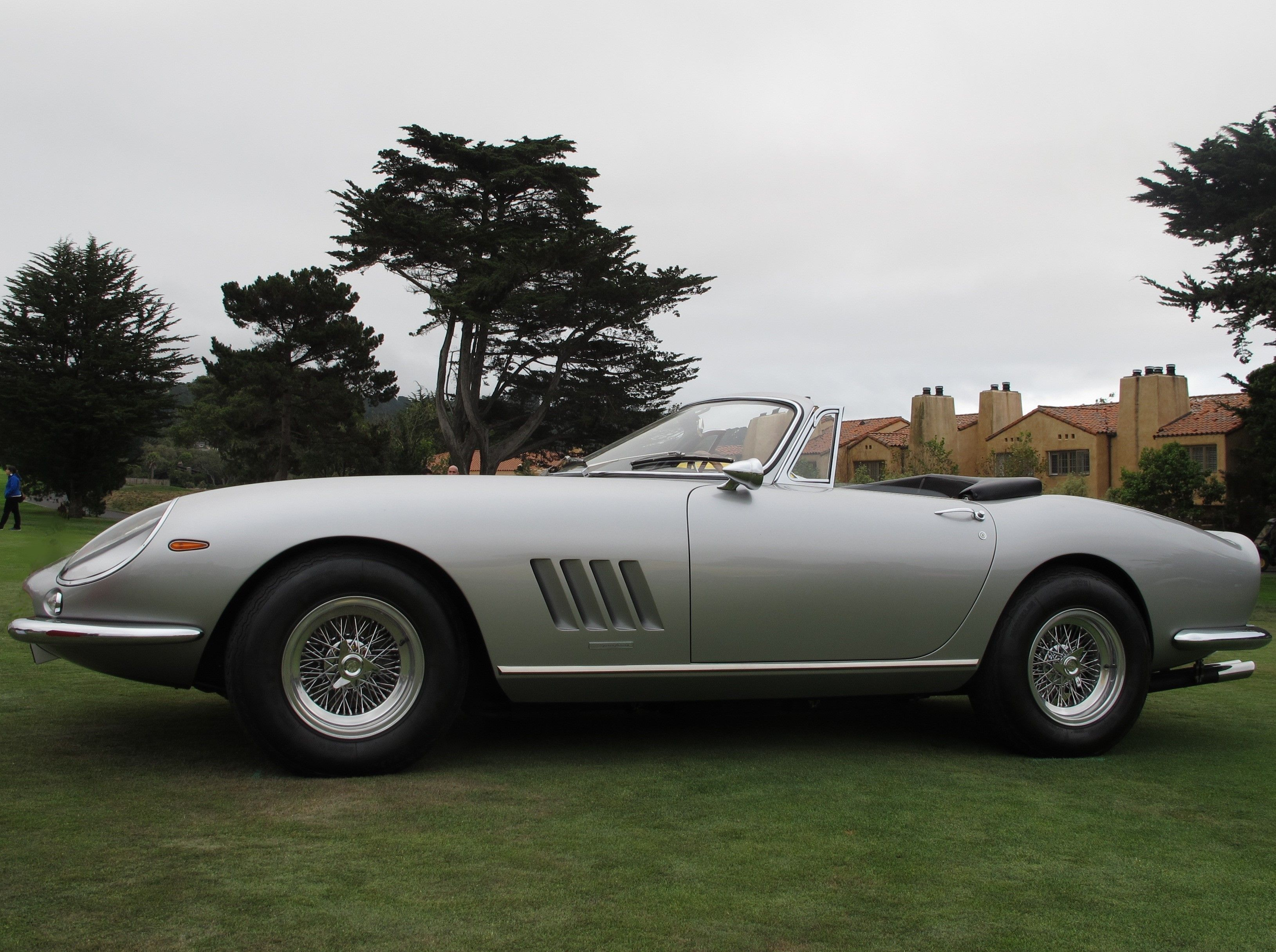

The 275 GTB/4S NART Spider was a roadgoing two-seater spider version of the 275 GTB/4, 10 of which were built in 1967. Production of this car was initiated by Ferrari's North American dealer, Luigi Chinetti, who wanted a successor to the earlier 250 California Spider series. He asked Sergio Scaglietti and Enzo Ferrari to build a spider version of the 275 GTB/4, which Chinetti bought for approximately $8,000 each, and listed at $14,400 retail. These cars were informally named NART Spiders, referring to Chinetti's North American Racing Team. While the name "NART" was never part of this model's official designation from the factory, a cloisonné badge with the team's logo was installed on the rear of each car.

Chinetti intended to order 25 NART Spiders from Scaglietti, but because of low sales just 10 were built in 1967 and 1968, making this one of the rarest 275 models. The ten NART Spiders used chassis numbers 09437, 09751, 10139, 10219, 10249, 10453, 10691, 10709, 10749, and 11057.

The magazine Road & Track published a road test of a then-new NART Spider in its September 1967 issue, describing it as "the most satisfying sports car in the world." This test recorded a 0-60 mph (97 km/h) time of 6.7 seconds, a 1/4 mile (0.40 km) drag strip time of 14.7 seconds. and a top speed of 155 mph (249 km/h).

The first produced 275 GTB/4S (chassis 09437) was entered in the 1967 12 Hours of Sebring, driven by Denise McCluggage and Marianne Rollo. They finished 17th overall, and 2nd in the 5-litre GT class. Following this race, the car was repainted from its original "Giallo solare" yellow to a burgundy colour for an appearance in the 1968 film The Thomas Crown Affair, where it was driven by Faye Dunaway's character. The same car was subsequently tested by Road & Track for their September 1967 road test article. In August 2005, 09437 sold for $3.96 million at Gooding & Co.'s Pebble Beach auction.

In August 2013, a 1967 275 GTB/4S NART spider (chassis 10709) sold for US$25 million (US$27.5m after commissions) at RM Sotheby's Monterey, California auction. At the time of the auction, this was a one-owner car, previously owned by Eddie Smith of Lexington, North Carolina. Mr. Smith purchased it new in 1968 and drove it regularly until his death in 2007. Subsequently, the car remained in possession of his family until the 2013 auction sale. Mr. Smith Jr. felt that the car was "sort of being imprisoned" hence the reason for the selling it. The winning bid was by Lawrence Stroll, collector and part-owner of Aston Martin Formula One team. The Smith family announced that the proceeds of the sale will be donated to charity.
