= Ferrari 250 =

Series of sports cars and grand tourers built by Ferrari from 1952 to 1964

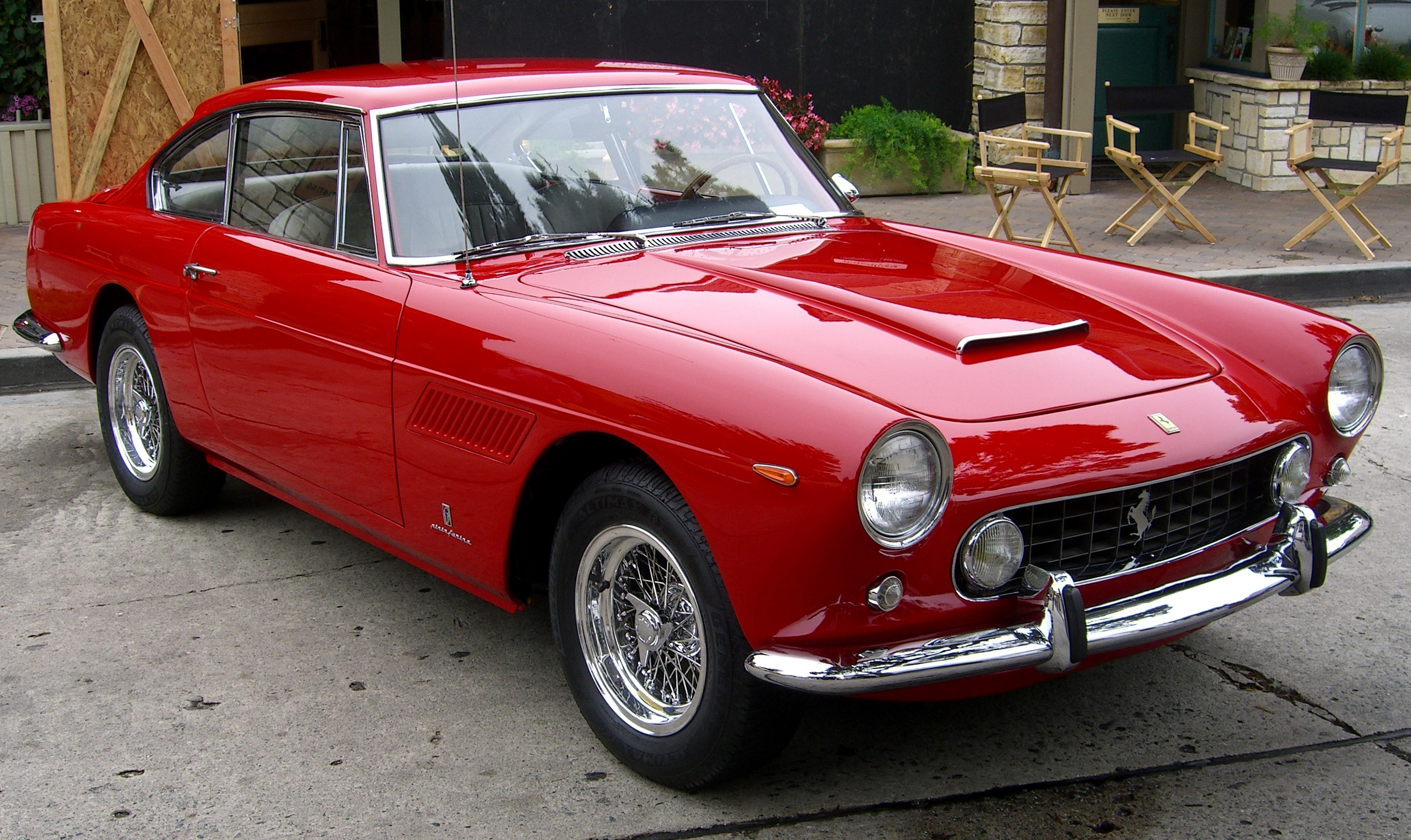
- 1962 Ferrari 250 GT/E

Overview
- Manufacturer: Ferrari
- Production: 1952–1964
- Designer: Giotto Bizzarrini; Scaglietti; Pinin Farina; Vignale; Ghia

Body and chassis
- Class: Grand Tourer
- Body style: Berlinetta cabriolet coupé
- Layout: Longitudinally-mounted, front-engine, rear-wheel-drive

Powertrain
- Engine: 3.0 L (2953.21 cc) Colombo V12; 3.0 L (2963.45 cc) Lampredi V12 (Europa)
- Transmission: 4-speed manual 5-speed manual

Dimensions
- Wheelbase: 2,400 mm (94.5 in) (SWB); 2,600 mm (102.4 in) (LWB); 2,800 mm (110.2 in) (Europa)

Chronology
- Predecessor: Ferrari 212 Inter/Ferrari 225 S
- Successor: Ferrari 275/Ferrari 330

The Ferrari 250 is a series of sports cars and grand tourers built by Ferrari from 1952 to 1964. The company's most successful early line, the 250 series includes many variants designed for road use or sports car racing. 250 series cars are characterised by their use of a 3.0 L (2,953 cc) Colombo V12 engine designed by Gioacchino Colombo. The 250 series designation refers to this engine's cylinder displacement of approximately 250 cc. They were replaced by the 275 and 330 series cars.

== Similarities ==
Most 250 road cars share the same two wheelbases, 2,400 mm (94.5 in) for short wheelbase (SWB) and 2,600 mm (102.4 in) for long wheelbase (LWB). Most convertibles used the SWB type.

Nearly all 250s share the same Colombo Tipo 125 V12 engine. At 2,953 cc (180 cu in), it was notable for its light weight and impressive output of up to 300 PS (221 kW; 296 hp) in the Testa Rossa and GTO. The V12 weighed hundreds of pounds less than its chief competitors — for example, it was nearly half the weight of the Jaguar XK straight-6. Ferrari uses the displacement of a single cylinder as the model designation.

The V12 propelled the Ferrari 250 racing cars to numerous victories.

== Racing models ==
Typical of Ferrari, the Colombo V12 made its debut on the race track, with the racing 250s preceding the street cars by three years.

=== 250 S ===
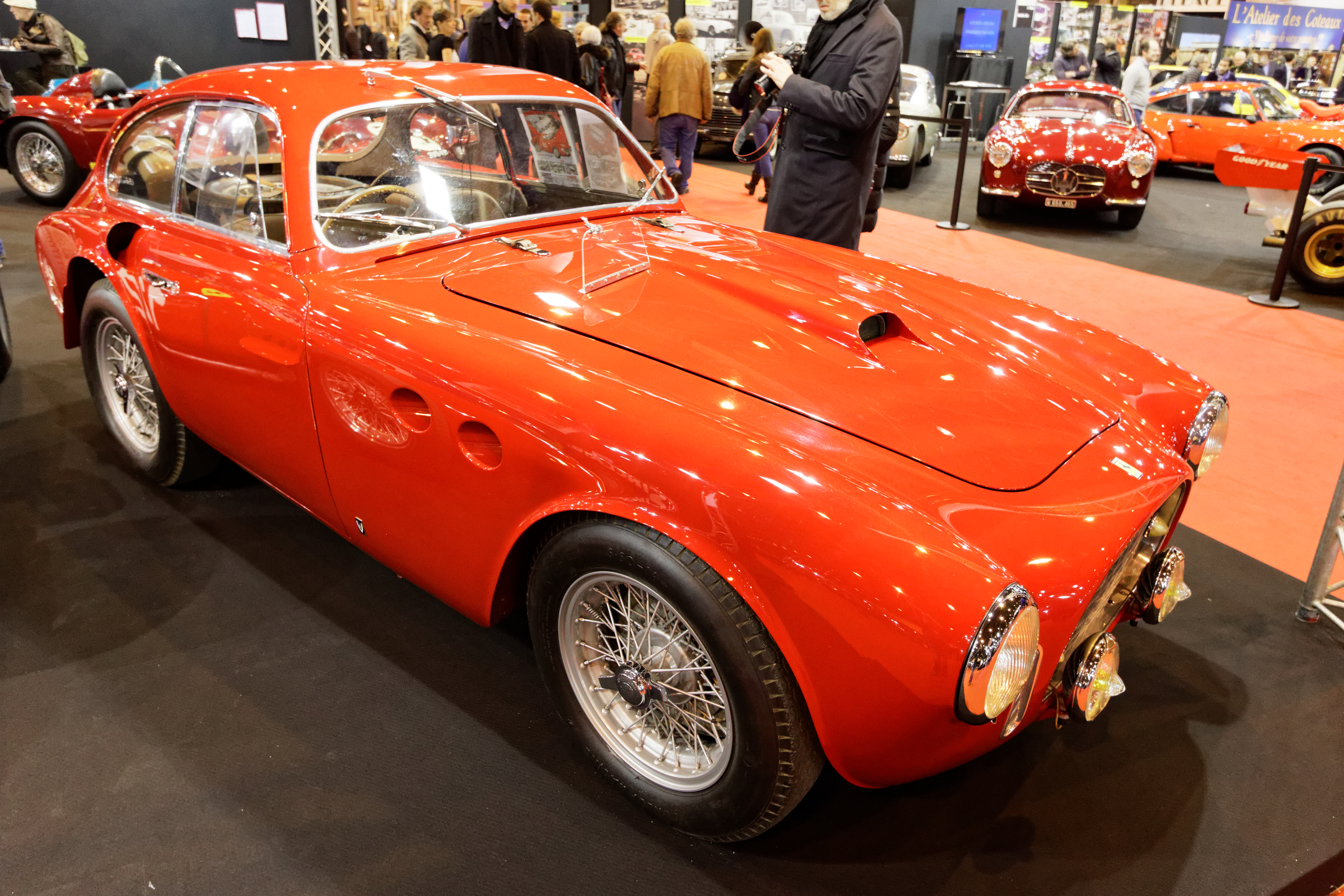
Ferrari 250 S

Based on Ferrari 225 S, the 250 S used a 2,250 mm (88.6 in) wheelbase with a "Tuboscocca" tubular trellis frame. Suspension was by double wishbones at the front, with double longitudinal semi-elliptic springs locating the live axle at the rear. The car had the drum brakes and worm-and-sector steering typical of the period. The dry-sump 3.0 L (2,953 cc (180 cu in) engine used three Weber 36DCF carburettors and was mated directly to a five-speed manual transmission.

The experimental 250 S berlinetta prototype was entered in the 1952 Mille Miglia for Giovanni Bracco and Alfonso Rolfo. The Mercedes-Benz 300 SL (W194 racers) of Rudolf Caracciola (winner in 1931), Hermann Lang (European Champion in 1939), and Karl Kling still used carburettors and had only 175 PS (129 kW; 173 hp) yet were quite fast on the long straights of some Mille Miglia sections, and later set fastest practice lap at Le Mans. Kling was in the lead after Rome but the 230 PS (169 kW; 227 hp) Bracco-Ferrari made up sufficient ground in the hills of the Futa Pass to win the race some four minutes ahead of Kling/Hans Klenk. The car was later entered at Le Mans and in the Carrera Panamericana, both won 1-2 by Mercedes.

=== 250 MM ===
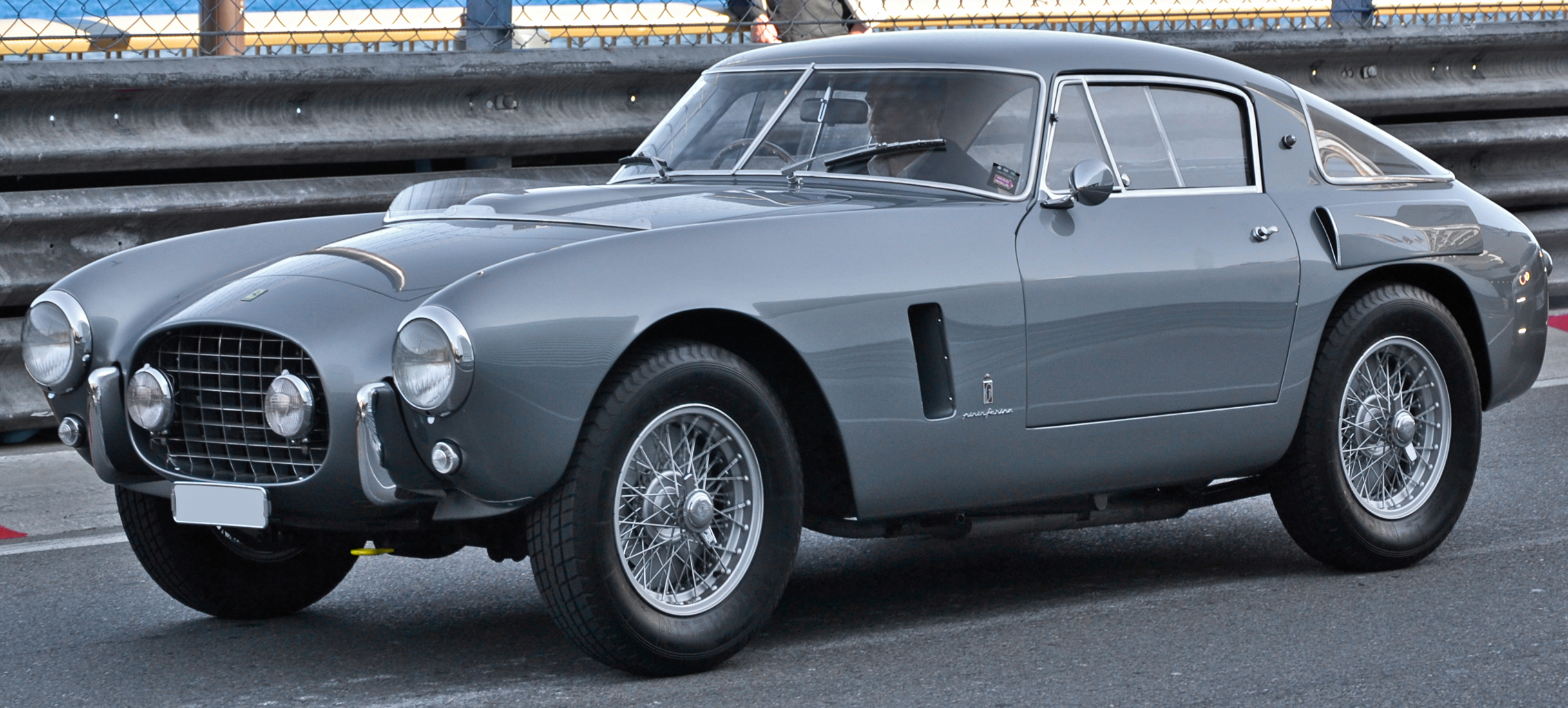
Ferrari 250 MM

Following the success of the 250 S in the Mille Miglia, Ferrari showed a more conventional chassis for the new 250 engine at the 1952 Paris Motor Show. Pinin Farina then created coupé bodywork which had a small grille, compact tail and panoramic rear window, and the new car was launched as the 250 MM (for Mille Miglia) at the 1953 Geneva Motor Show. Carrozzeria Vignale's open barchetta version was also an innovative design whose recessed headlights and side vents became a Ferrari staple for the 1950s. 0334MM was the sole chassis with Vignale Berlinetta body, distinctive for its triple portholes on the bottom of front fenders, not on top.

The 250 MM's wheelbase was longer than the 250 S at 2,400 mm (94.5 in), with the coupé 50 kg (110 lb) heavier than the 850 kg (1,874 lb) barchetta. The V12 engine's dry sump was omitted from the production car, and the transmission was reduced by one gear. Power was increased to 240 PS (177 kW; 237 hp). The four-cylinder 625 TF and 735 S replaced the V12-powered 250 MM later in 1953.

The 250 MM's race debut was at the 1953 Giro di Sicilia with privateer Paolo Marzotto. A Carrozzeria Morelli-bodied 250 MM barchetta driven by Clemente Biondetti came fourth in the 1954 Mille Miglia.

=== 250 Monza ===
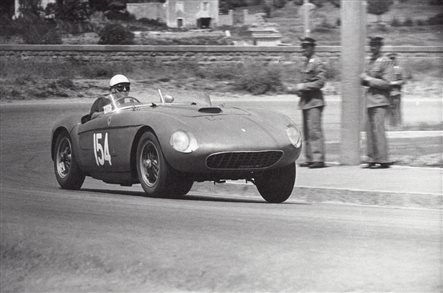
250 Monza

The 1954 250 Monza was an unusual hybrid of the light four-cylinder 500 Mondial and the 250 line. The model used the 250 MM engine in the short-wheelbase chassis from the 500 Mondial. The first three used the Pinin Farina barchetta shape of the 750 Monza and 500 Mondial. One more 250 Monza was built by Carrozzeria Scaglietti, an early use of the now-familiar coachbuilder. The 250 Monzas failed to gain much success and the union of the Monza chassis and 250 engine was not pursued for some time.

=== 250 Testa Rossa ===
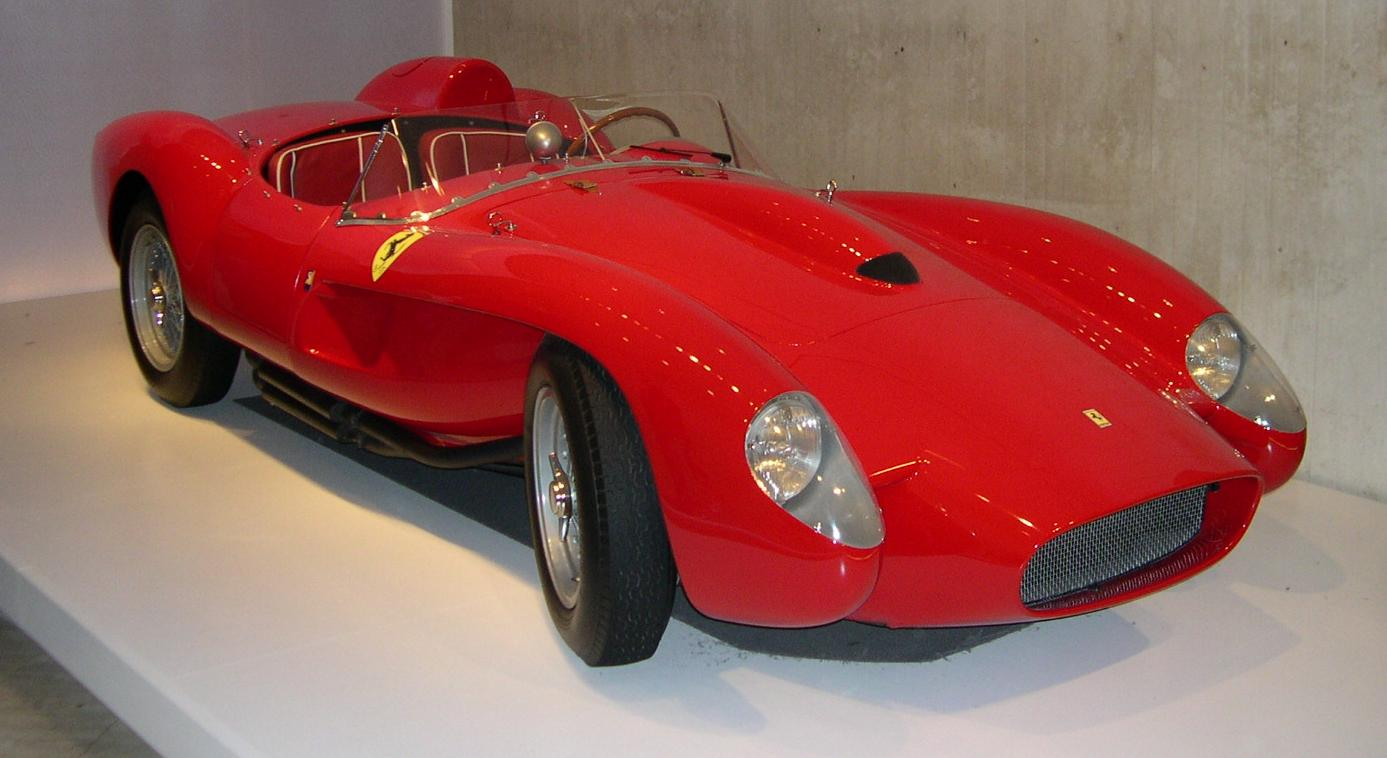
1958 Ferrari 250 Testa Rossa

The racing 250 Testa Rossa was one of the most successful Ferrari racing cars in its history, with three wins at Le Mans, four wins at Sebring, and two wins at Buenos Aires. One example sold at auction for a (then) record-breaking $16.39 million.

=== 250 GTO ===
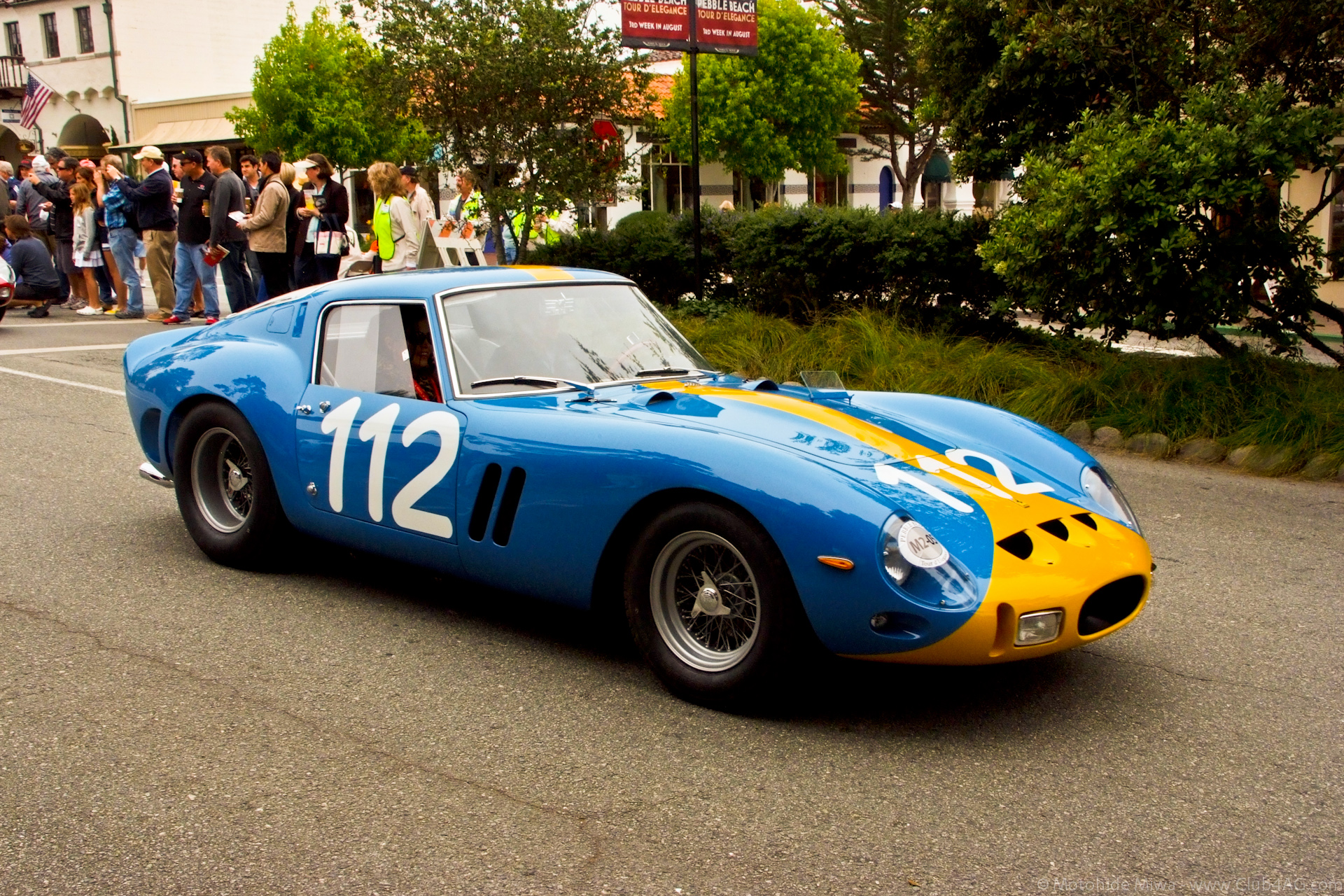
Ferrari 250 GTO

The 250 GTO was produced from 1962 to 1964 for homologation into the FIA's Group 3 Grand Touring Car category. GTO stands for "Gran Turismo Omologato", Italian for "Homologated Grand Tourer". When new, the GTO sold for $18,000 in the United States, and buyers had to be personally approved by Enzo Ferrari and his dealer for North America, Luigi Chinetti.

In May 2012, the 1963 Ferrari 250 GTO chassis number 3505GT sold by an auction for US$38,115,000.

In October 2013, the 1963 Ferrari 250 GTO chassis number 5111GT sold by Connecticut-based collector Paul Pappalardo to an unnamed buyer in a private transaction for US$52 million.

In August 2018, the 1962 Ferrari 250 GTO chassis number 3413GT sold at auction for US$48,405,000.

Thirty-three cars were made in 1962 and 1963. In 1964 the Series II was introduced, which had a different body. Three such cars were made, and four older Series I cars were given a Series II body. It brought the total number of GTOs produced to 36.

In 2004, Sports Car International placed the 250 GTO eighth on a list of Top Sports Cars of the 1960s, and nominated it the top sports car of all time. Motor Trend Classic placed it first on a list of the "Greatest Ferraris of all time".

=== 250 P ===
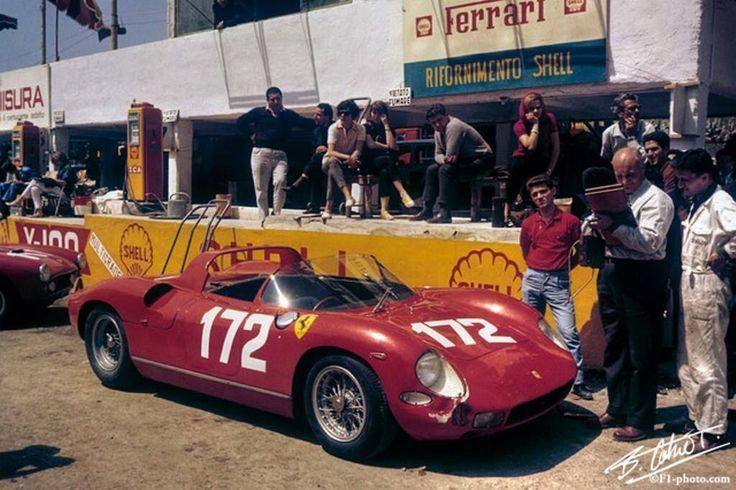
Ferrari 250 P

The 250 P was a prototype racer produced in 1963, winning that year's 12 Hours of Sebring, 1000 km Nürburgring and the 24 Hours of Le Mans. The 250 P used an engine derived from the 250 Testa Rossa, mounted in a rear mid-engine, rear wheel drive configuration.

=== 250 LM ===
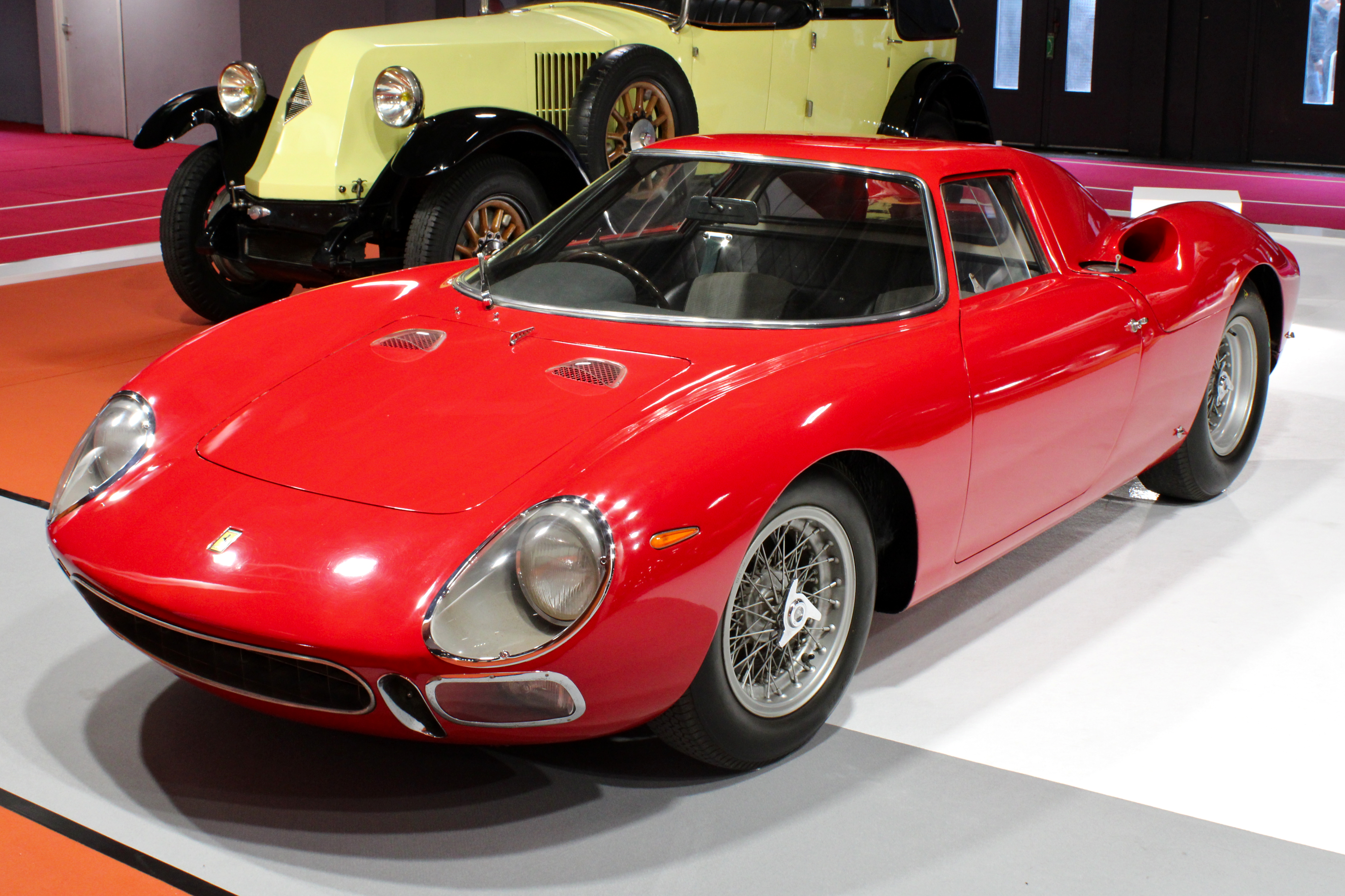
1965 250 LM

The mid-engined 250 Le Mans looked very much the prototype racer but was intended for production as a road-going GT. Descended from the 250 P, the Le Mans also appeared in 1963 and sported Pininfarina bodywork by Aldo Brovarone. Ferrari was unable to persuade the FIA that he would build the 100 examples required to homologate the car for GT racing. Eventually, 32 LMs were built up to 1965. As a result, Ferrari withdrew from factory participation in the GT class of the 1965 World Sportscar Championship, allowing the Shelby Cobra team to dominate. A 250LM, competing in the Prototype category, won the 1965 24 Hours of Le Mans.

Only the very early LM's were true 250 models. All the others were made as 3.3-litre models, and as such should have been named 275 LM. The early cars were converted to the 3.3-litre engine.

== GT cars ==
The 250 design was successful both on the road and on the track. A number of GT models were built in varying states of road or racing trim.

=== 250 Europa ===
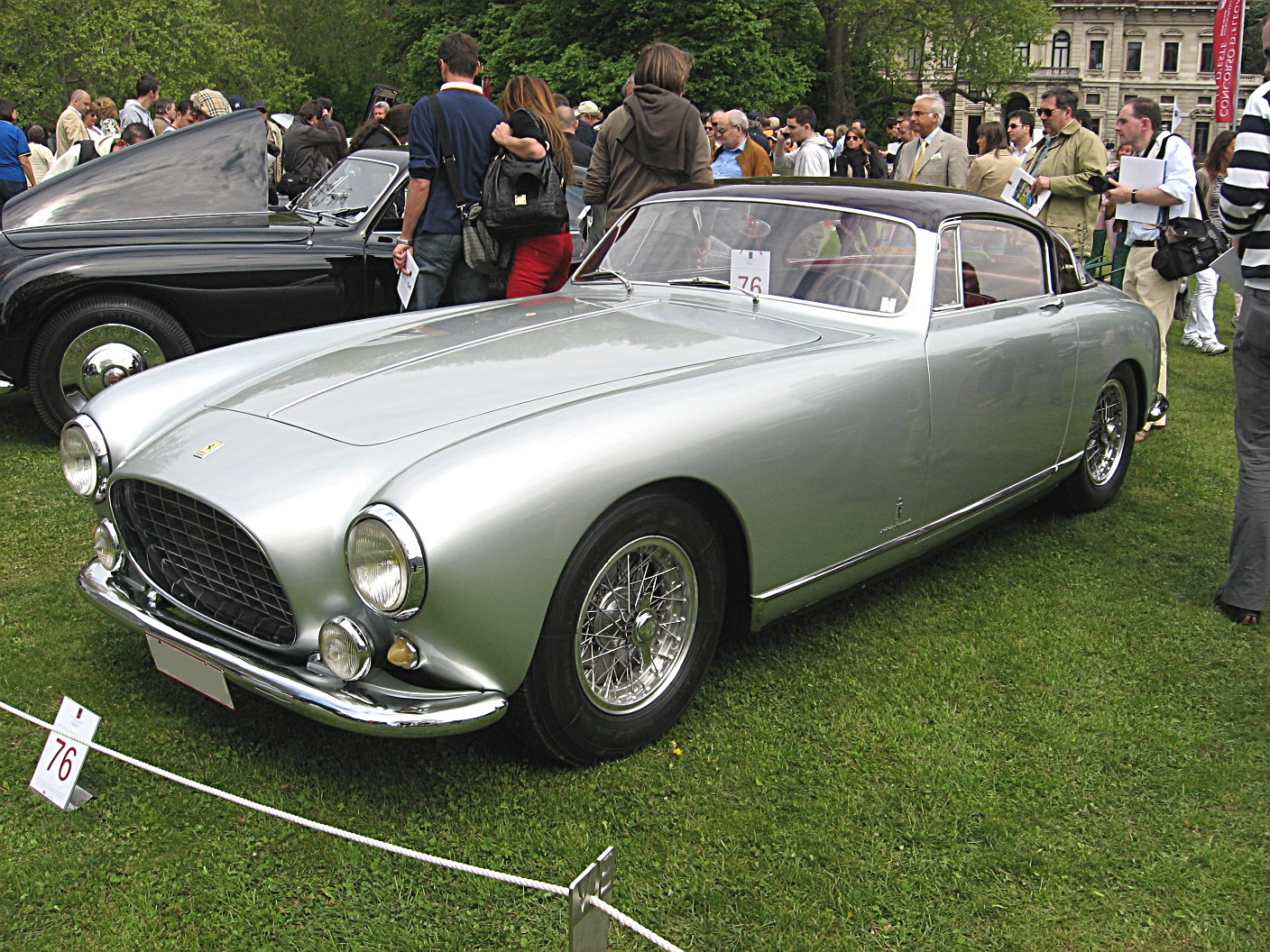
Ferrari 250 Europa Pinin Farina Coupé

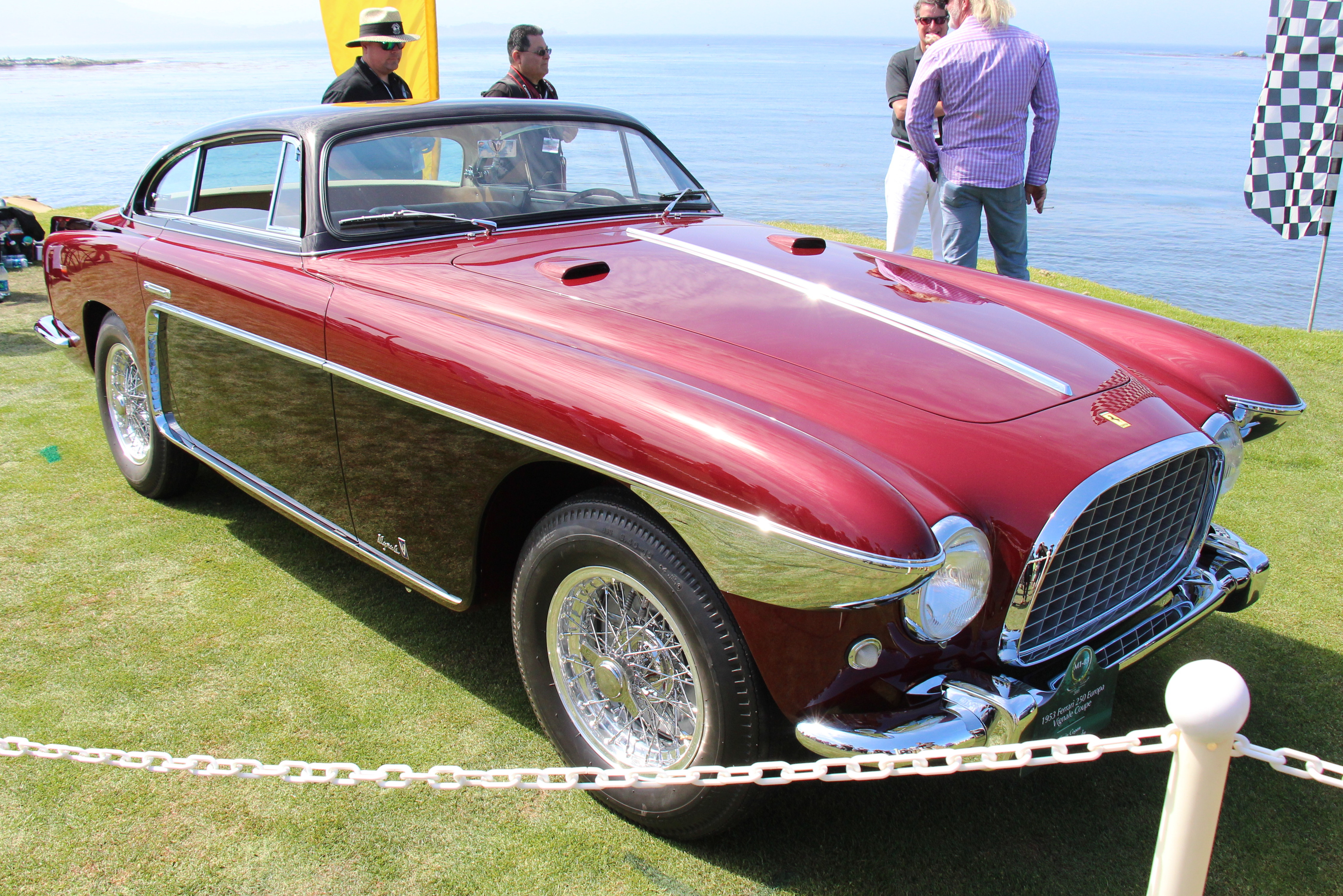
Ferrari 250 Europa Vignale Coupé

The 250 Europa, introduced at the 1953 Paris Motor Show, was the only one of the family to use a different engine, sporting the 2963 cc Lampredi V12 based on a design for Formula One 3.3 L engine. It was a square engine, with 68 mm (2.7 in) of bore and stroke, developing 200 PS (147 kW; 197 hp) at 6,300 rpm, with three Weber 36DCF (or DCZ) carburettors, and mated to a 4-speed transmission. With the long 2,800 mm (110.2 in) wheelbase and Ferrari 375 America-style bodies, it was designed as a grand tourer. Three different rear axle ratios were offered to customers, providing an estimated top speed between 180–217 kilometres per hour (112–135 mph) depending on the ratio. Both 250 Europa and 375 America shared the same chassis, wheelbase and mechanicals apart for the engine. The majority of bodywork were designed by Pinin Farina. Some had bodies designed by Giovanni Michelotti and constructed by Vignale. Styling resembled the 375 America and 340 Mexico coupes. 22 were made, including 17 Pinin Farina-built coupes, 4 Vignale coupes, 1 Pinin Farina cabriolet and 1 Vignale cabriolet. Two were later converted by the Ferrari factory to 375 America specification (chassis 0315AL and 0353EU).

=== 250 Europa GT ===
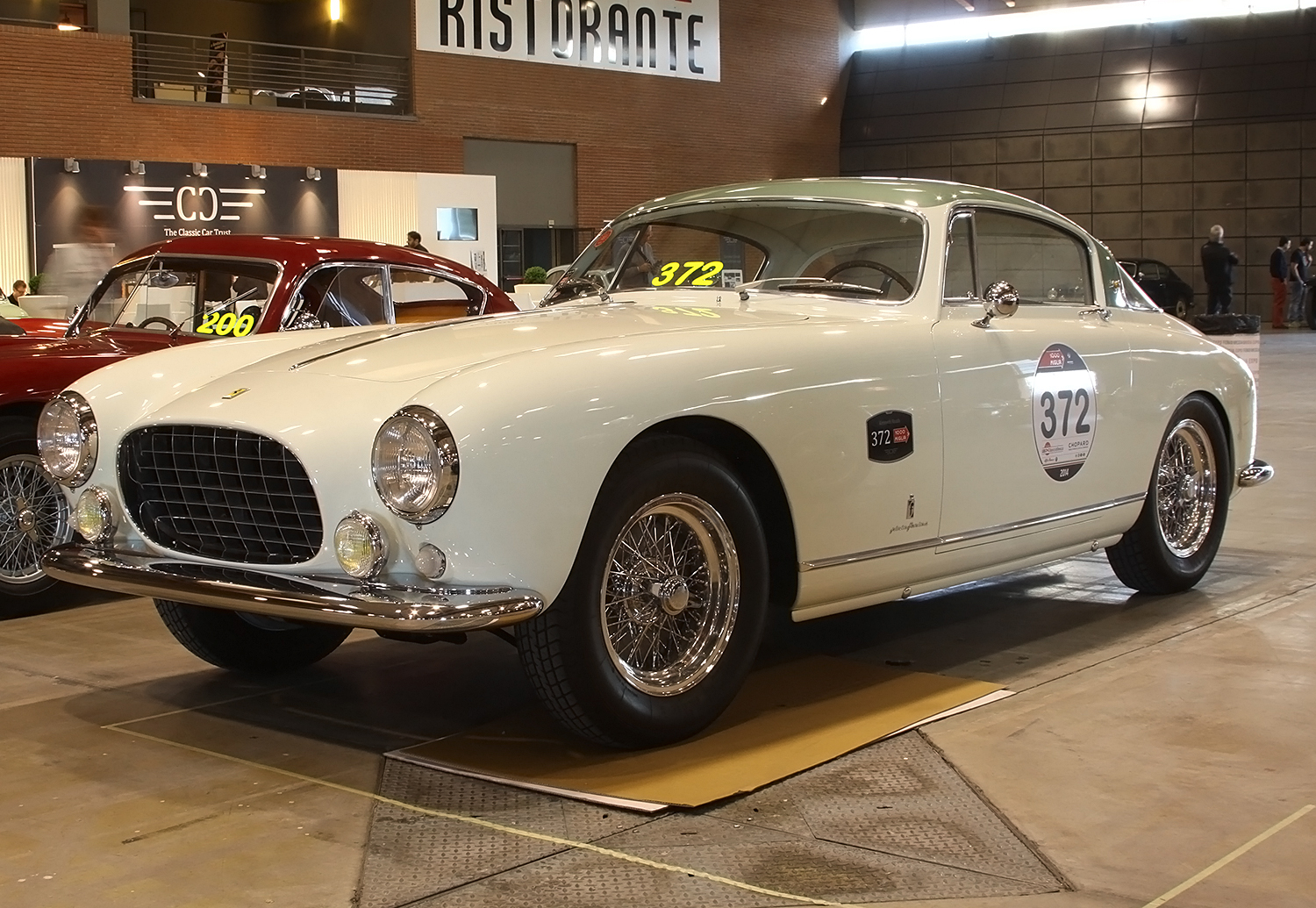
250 Europa GT

The first road car to use Colombo's 250 V12 was the 250 Europa GT, introduced at the 1954 Paris Motor Show. It was also the first Ferrari to use the Gran Turismo moniker. Pinin Farina's Paris coupé was just one of many shapes for the 250 GT model line, with coachbuilt production extending through 1956 before the 250 line became more standardized. The original 250 Europa GT used a 2,600 mm (102.4 in) wheelbase on a conventional chassis, with 600-16 Stella Bianca tyres. The wet sump V12 was tuned to 220 PS (162 kW; 217 hp), with three Weber 36DCZ3 carburettors. Echoing Vignale's 250 Europa, Pinin Farina added now-familiar vents to the front fenders, a standard styling cue for many of the 250 GTs that followed. Chassis Nr. 0373 finished third at the Liège-Rome-Liège rally in 1956

=== 250 GT Coupé Boano and Ellena ===
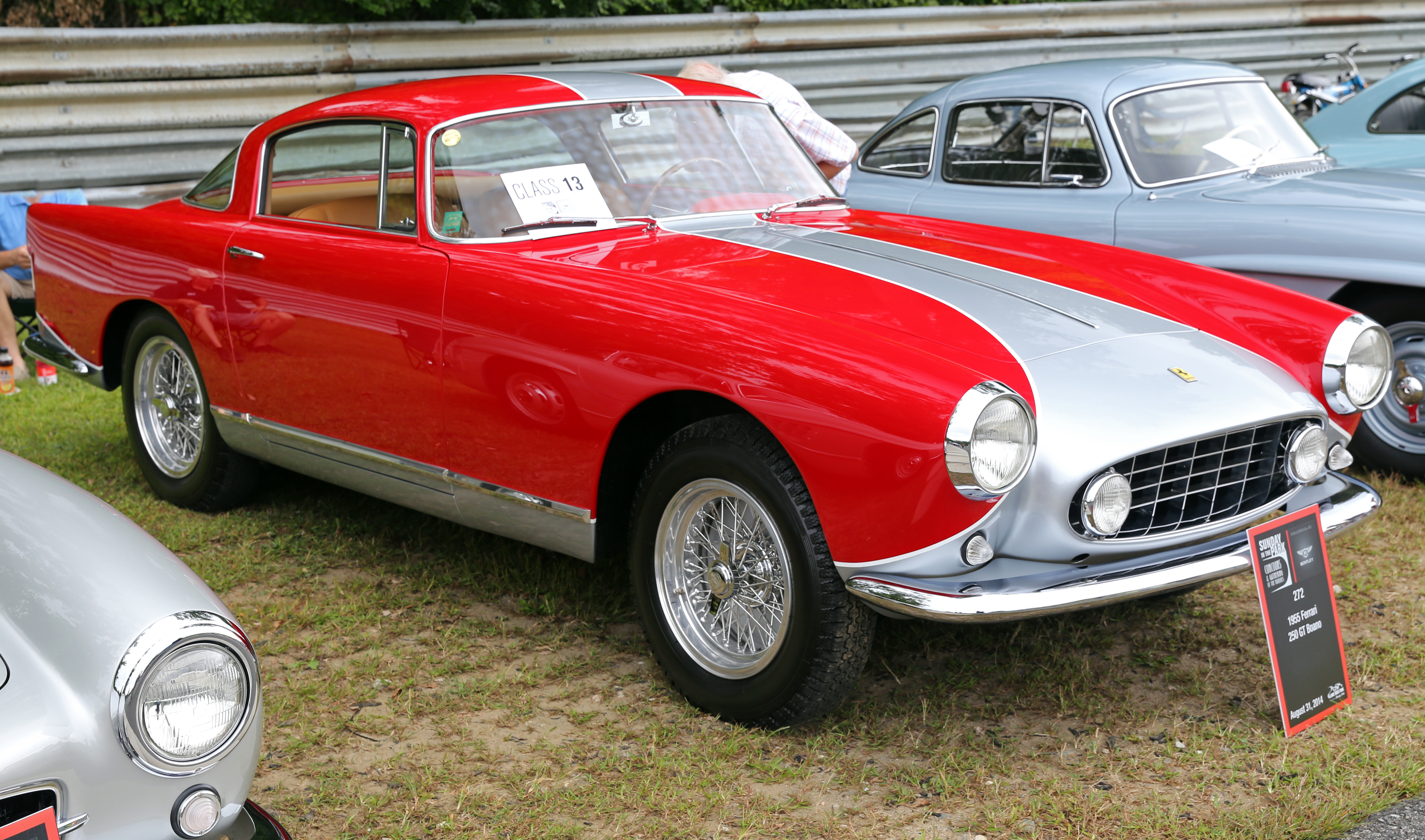
250 GT Boano, with an all-alloy body built in 1956

Pinin Farina introduced a 250-based prototype coupé at the 1956 Geneva Motor Show which came to be called the 250 GT Boano. Intended as a styling exercise and inspiration to 250 GT Europa customers, the car generated demand that soon called for a production series.

Unable to meet the demand without expansion, Pinin Farina asked Mario Boano, formerly of Ghia, to handle the construction. When Fiat later recruited Boano, he handed production duties to his son-in-law Ezio Ellena. With partner Luciano Pollo, Carrozzeria Ellena would produce the 250 GT for another few years. Ellena revised the car, raising the roof and removing the vent windows from the doors. These examples became known as the 250 GT Ellena.

Carrozzeria Boano built 74 250 GTs on the long-wheelbase chassis. Carrozzeria Ellena built another 50 Coupés.

All but one were coupés. The single convertible, 0461 GT, was sold to New York collector Bob Lee off the stand at the 1956 New York Auto Show. At the direction of Enzo Ferrari, Lee bought the car for $9,500, far below cost. He still owns it, making it one of the oldest Ferraris still in the hands of the original purchaser.

=== 250 GT Pinin Farina Coupé Speciale ===
Four examples of the 250 GT Coupé Speciale were made, on the type 513 chassis. (Although chassis numbers were in the middle of the Boano 250 GT Coupé run they did not share the same chassis type). They had Series I 410 Superamerica-style bodies and type 128, 3.0 V12 engines.

=== 250 GT Berlinetta "Tour de France" ===
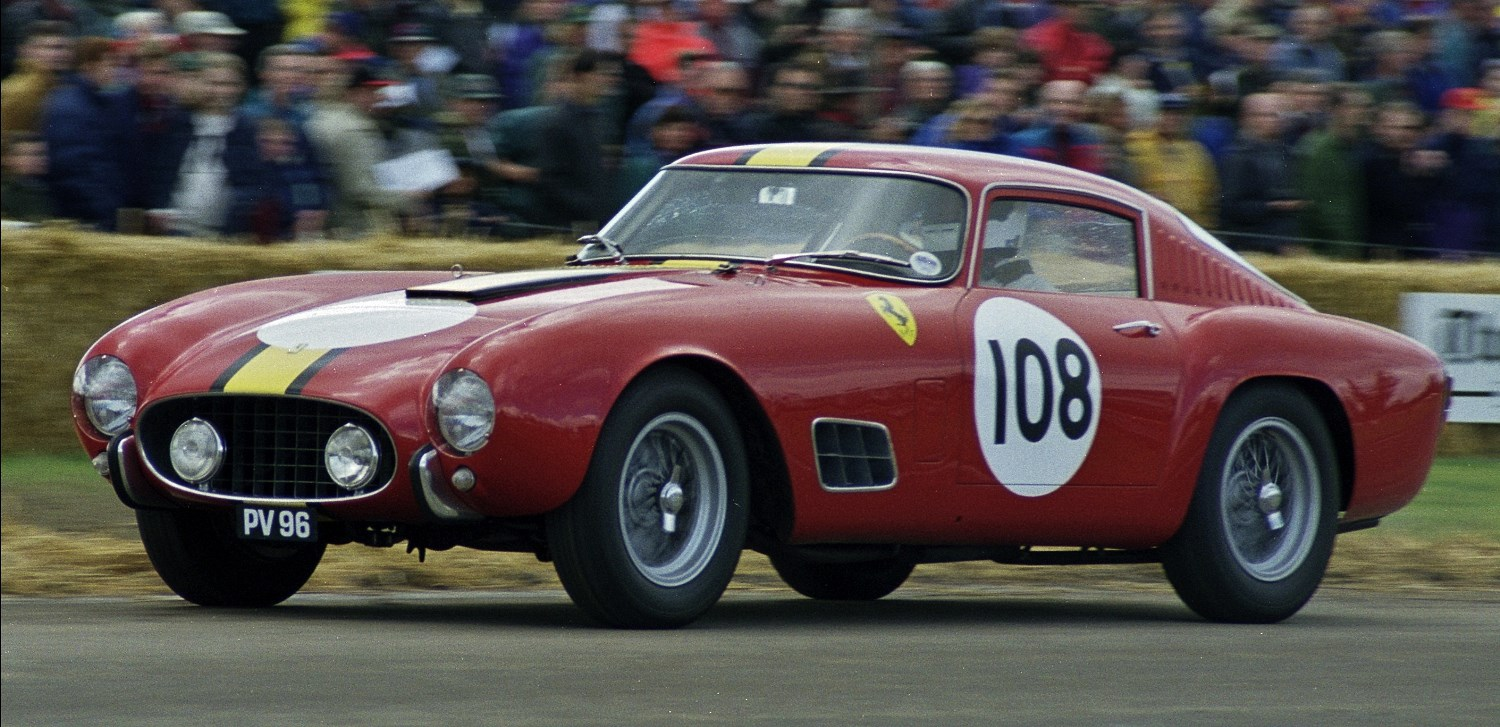
250 GT TdF "14 louvre" #0677GT, in Écurie Francorchamps colours, at the 1997 Goodwood Festival of Speed

The original 250 GT Berlinetta, nicknamed the "Long Wheelbase Berlinetta", was also called the "Tour de France" after competing in the 10-day Tour de France automobile race. Seventy-seven Tour de France cars were built, of which a number were sold for GT races from 1956 through 1959. Construction was handled by Carrozzeria Scaglietti based on a Pinin Farina design. The engine began at 240 PS (177 kW; 237 hp) but eventually rose to 260 PS (191 kW; 256 hp).

At the 1956 Geneva Motor Show, Scaglietti displayed their own 250 GT prototype, which became known as the limited-production, Series I, "no-louvre" 250 GT Berlinetta. The first customer car was built in May 1956, with production now the responsibility of Scaglietti in Modena. Fourteen "no-louvre" and nine "14-louvre" Series I and II Berlinettas were made.

There were four series of 250 GT Berlinettas. In mid-1957 the Series III cars were introduced, with three louvres and covered headlights. Eighteen were produced. The 36 Series IV cars retained the covered headlights and had a single vent louvre. Zagato also made five "no-louvre" superlight cars to Ugo Zagato's design.

A 250 GT Berlinetta won Tour de France Automobile three times in 1956, 1957 and 1958. Ferrari's winning streak in this race would be continued with later 'Interim' and SWB Berlinettas.

=== 250 GT Cabriolet Pinin Farina Series I ===
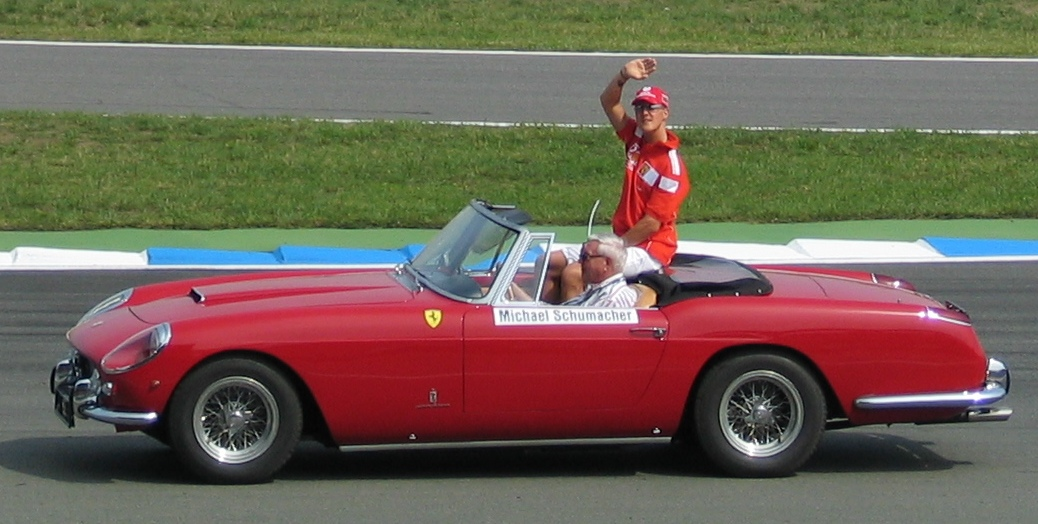
Michael Schumacher rides in a 250 GT Cabriolet.

Released at the Geneva Motor Show in 1957, the original 250 GT Cabriolet Pinin Farina Series I used the 2,600 mm (102.4 in) wheelbase and the body was styled differently from the Berlinetta.

About 36 examples were produced before a second series was shown at Paris in 1959. These later cars had more in common with the production Berlinetta.

About 200 of the Series II cars were built.

Motor Trend Classic placed the 250 GT Series I Cabriolet and Coupé ninth on their list of the ten "Greatest Ferraris of all time".

=== 250 GT California Spyder LWB ===
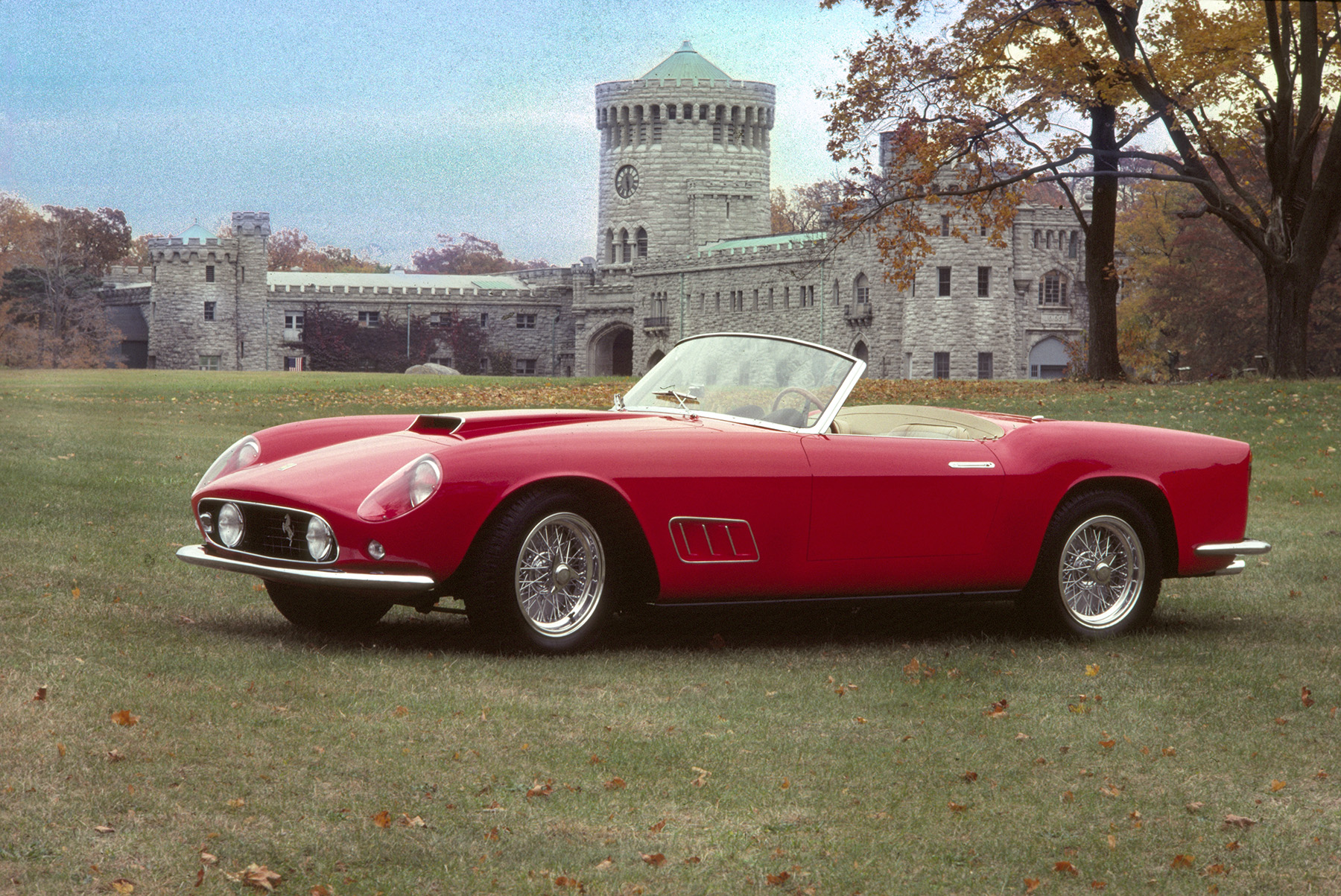
1959 California Spyder LWB

Designed for export to North America, the 1957 250 GT California Spyder was Scaglietti's interpretation of an open-top 250 GT. Aluminium was used for the hood, doors, and trunk lid, with steel elsewhere for most models. Several aluminium-bodied racing versions were also built. The engine was the same as in the 250 Tour de France racing car with up to 240 PS (237 hp; 177 kW) at 7000 rpm and a maximum torque of 265 N⋅m (195 lb⋅ft; 27 kg⋅m) at 5000 rpm, from a 2,953 cc (3.0 L; 180.2 cu in) naturally aspirated SOHC 2 valves per cylinder 60º Ferrari Colombo V12 engine, equipped with 3 Weber carburetors. All used the long 2,600 mm (102.4 in) chassis.

A total of fifty LWBs were made before the SWB version superseded them in 1960. One example sold at auction on August 18, 2007, in Monterey, California, for $4.9 million.

=== 250 GT Coupé Pinin Farina ===
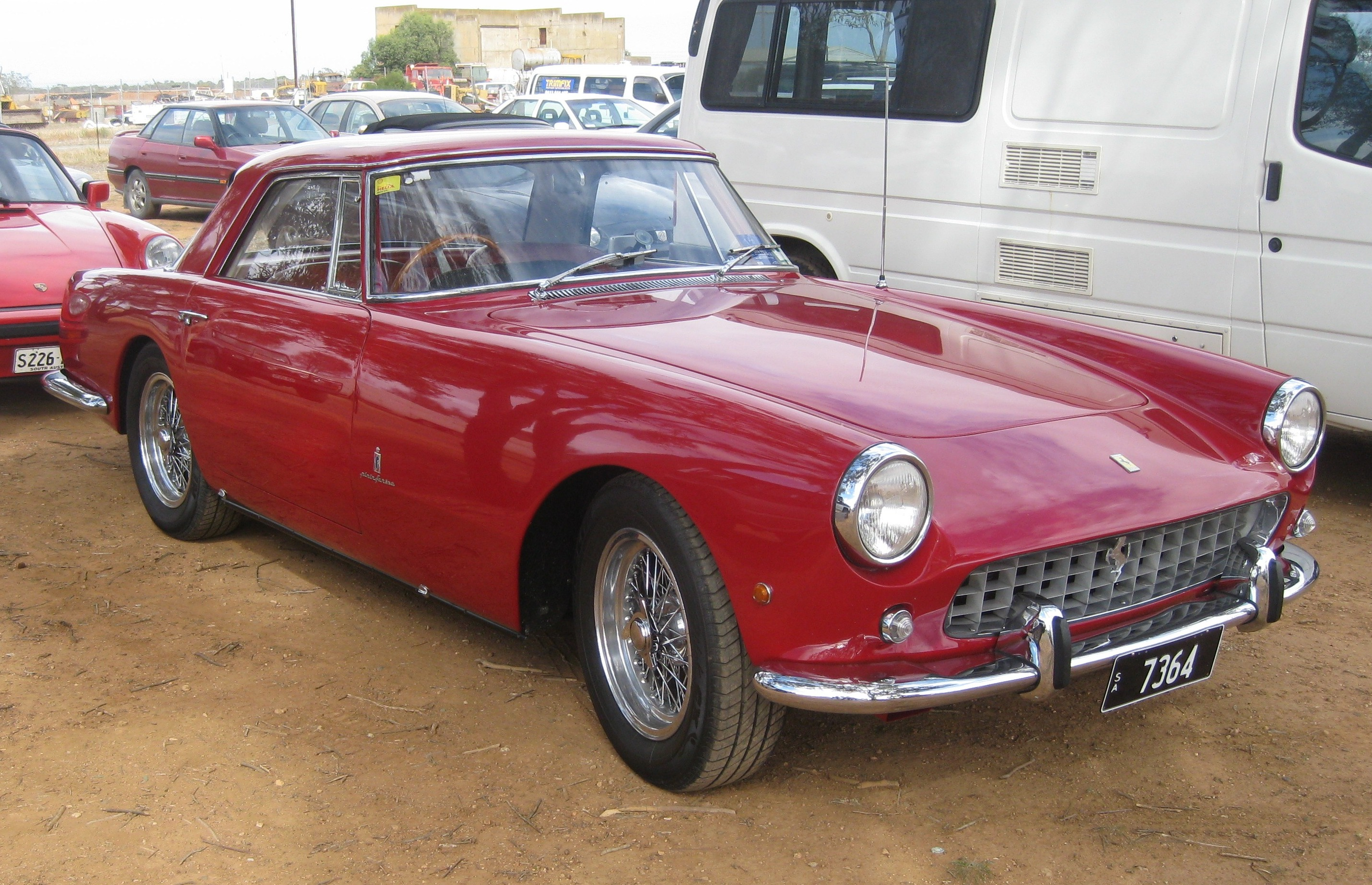
250 GT Coupé Pinin Farina

Needing series production to stabilise his company's finances, Enzo Ferrari asked Pinin Farina to design a simple and classic 250 GT coupé. After the 250 GT Coupé Boano/Ellena, Pinin Farina's Grugliasco plant expanded and now had the capacity to produce the new 250 GT Coupé Pinin Farina. It was introduced at Milan in 1958, and 335 near-identical examples were built by 1960. Buyers included Prince Bertil of Sweden. The GT Coupé eschewed the fender vents for simple, clean lines and a notchback look with panoramic rear window. The oval grille was replaced by a more traditional long narrow look with protruding headlights. Telescopic shock absorbers were also fitted instead of the Houdailles on previous 250s, and disc brakes were added in 1960. The final 250 GT Coupé had a Superfast tail and was shown at the 1961 London Motor Show.

=== 250 GT Cabriolet Pinin Farina Series II ===
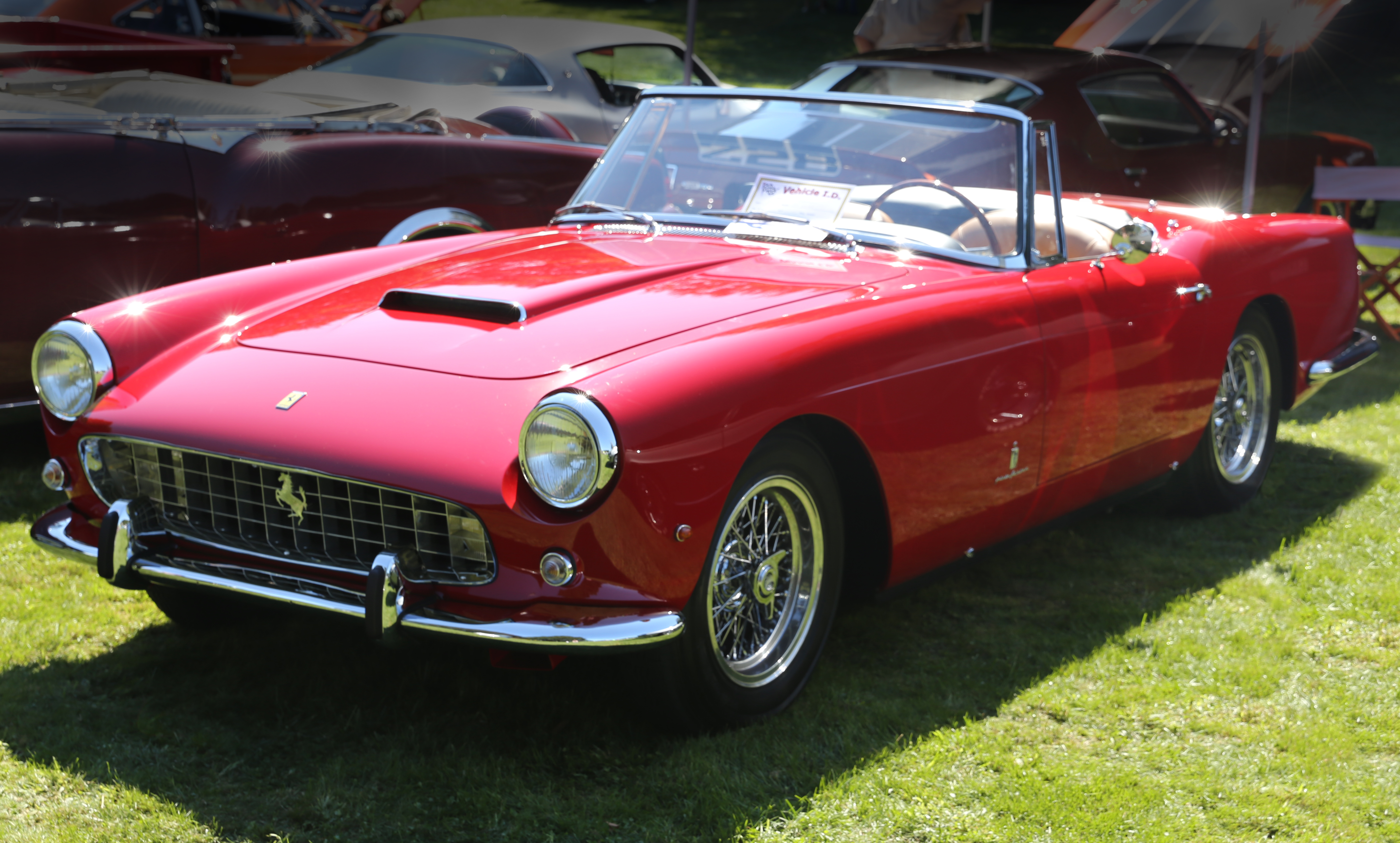
250 GT Cabriolet Pinin Farina, series II

In line with the high-volume coupé, Pinin Farina also designed a plainer 250 GT Cabriolet for series production. Introduced at the 1959 Paris Motor Show, the GT Cabriolet sported a look similar to the GT Coupé of the previous year, including the removal of the side vents. On the Coupé the headlights were uncovered. About 212 were produced.

=== 250 GT Berlinetta "Interim" ===
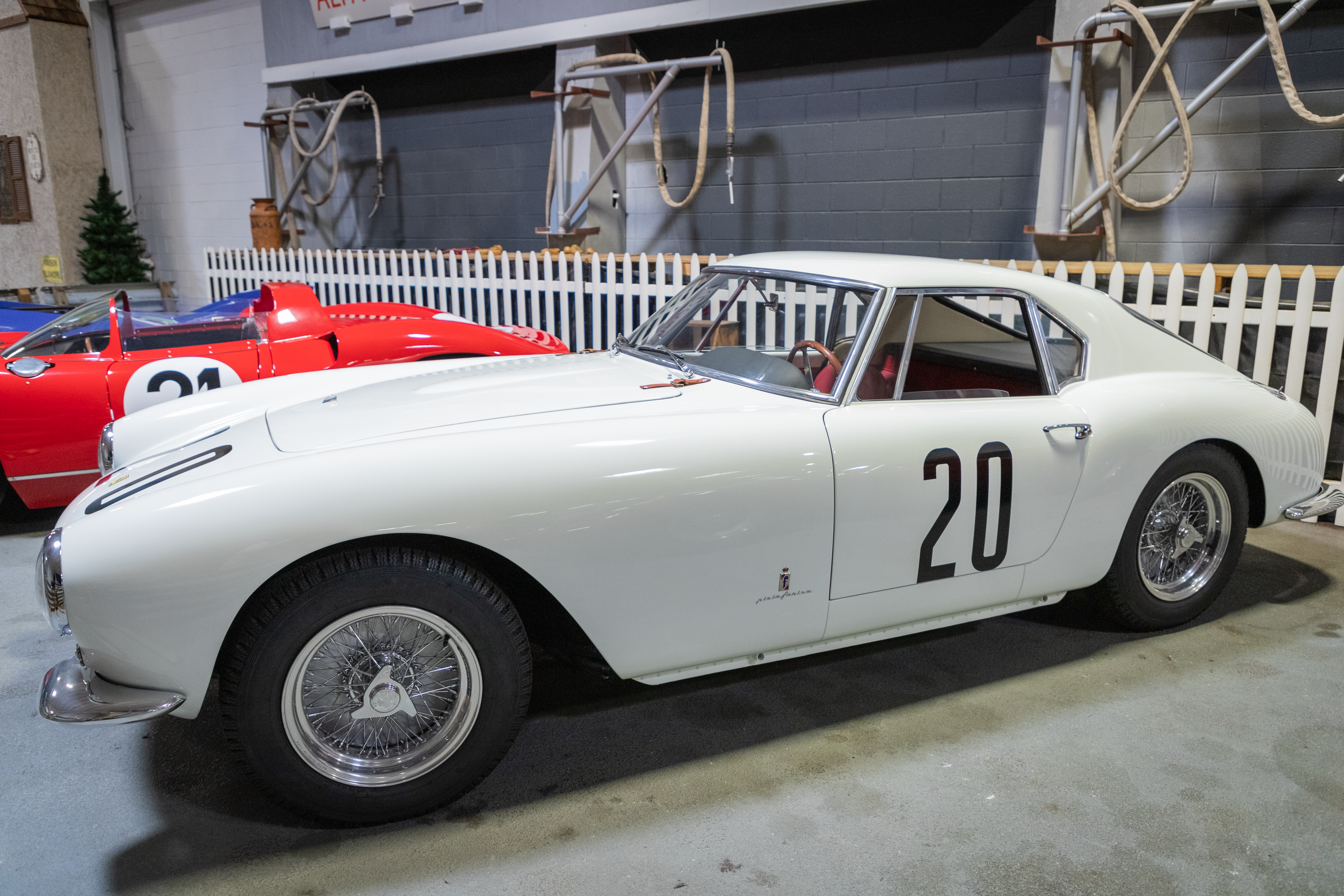
Ferrari 250 GT Berlinetta Interim

In 1959, seven 250 GT "Interim" LWB Berlinettas were made. They utilised the old long-wheelbase chassis and had the new Pinin Farina bodywork of the upcoming SWB Berlinettas. The bodies are all-aluminium. Interim vehicles have an additional rear quarter window, absent from the succeeding "Passo Corto" Berlinettas. The Interim vehicles are serial numbers 1377GT, 1461GT, 1465GT, 1509GT, 1519GT, 1521GT and 1523GT. 'Interim' Berlinetta won 1959 Tour de France Automobile, thus continuing Ferrari's dominance.

=== 250 GT Berlinetta SWB ===
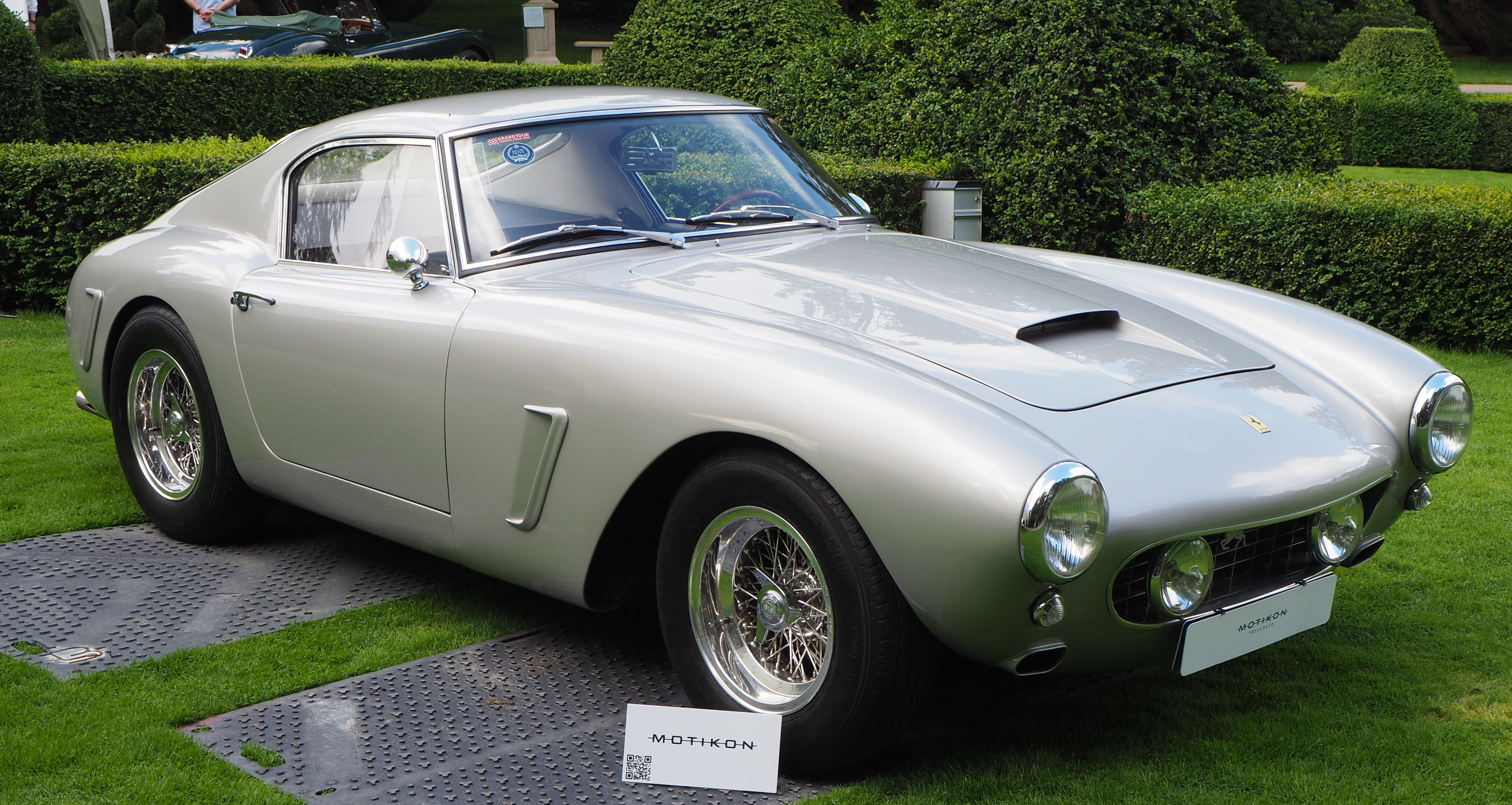
Ferrari 250 GT Berlinetta SWB

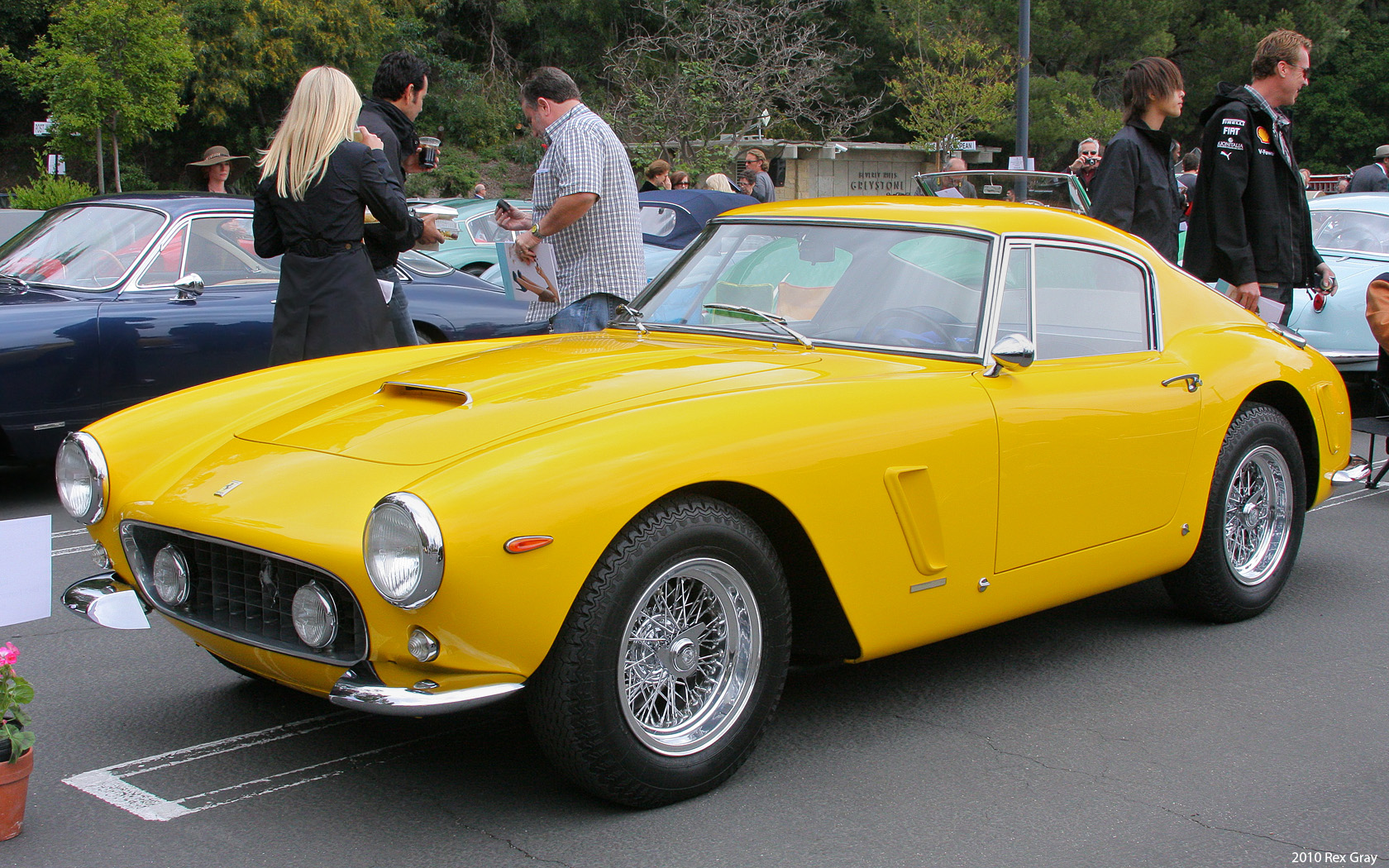
Ferrari 250 GT Berlinetta SWB 1962

One of the most notable GT racers of its time, the 1959 250 GT Berlinetta SWB used a short (2,400 mm (94.5 in)) wheelbase for better handling. It was this car type that on 17 June 1960 received FIA homologation Nr. 22 for Group GT just in time for the 25 June 1960 Le Mans.

Of the 176 examples built, both steel and aluminium bodies were used in various road ("lusso") and racing trims. Engine output ranged from 240 PS (177 kW; 237 hp) to 280 PS (206 kW; 276 hp).

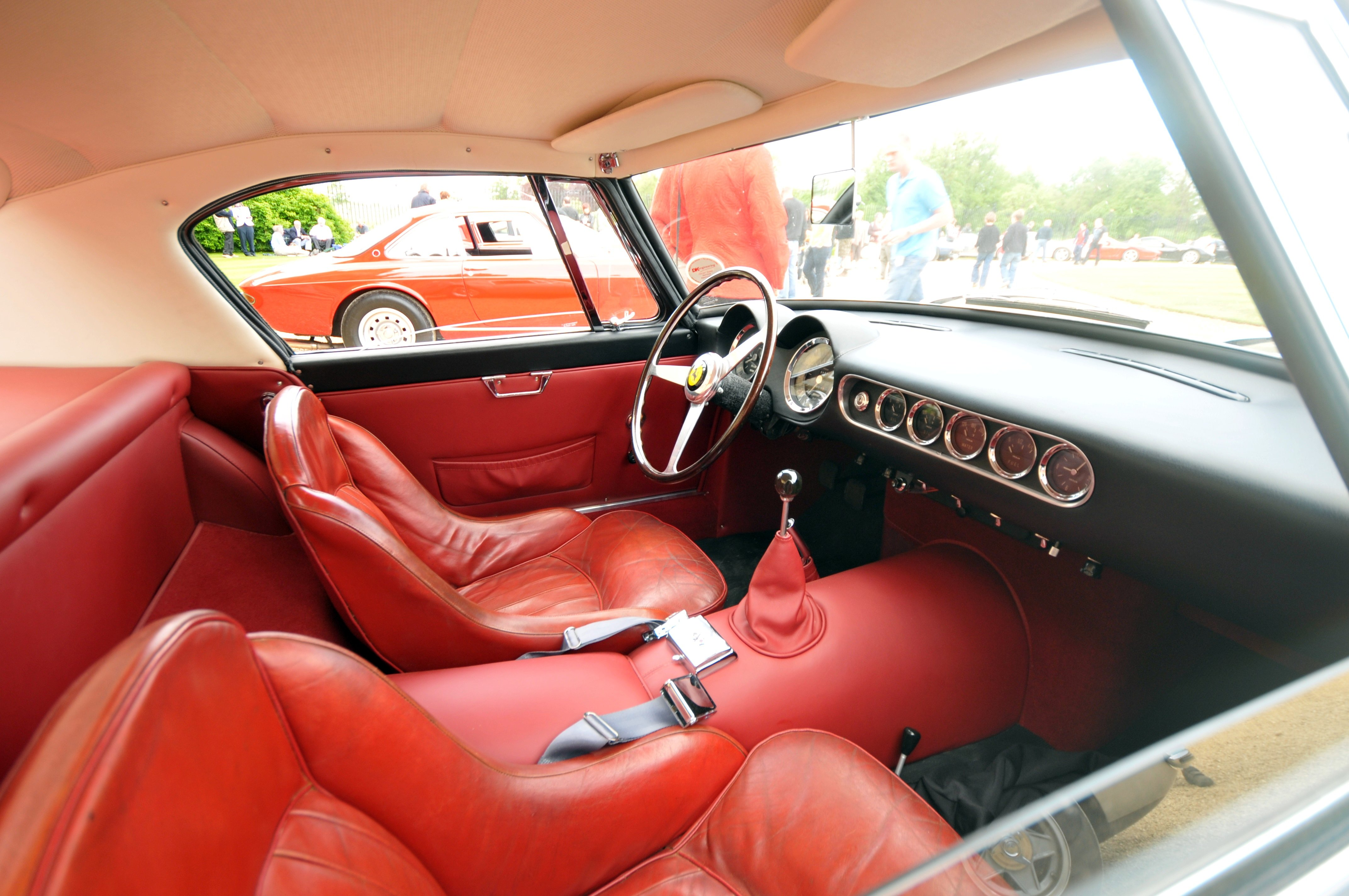
250 GT Berlinetta SWB interior

Development of the 250 GT SWB Berlinetta was handled by Giotto Bizzarrini, Carlo Chiti, and young Mauro Forghieri, the same team that later produced the 250 GTO. Disc brakes were a first on a Ferrari GT, and the combination of low weight, high power, and well-sorted suspension made it competitive. It was unveiled at the Paris Motor Show in October and quickly began selling and racing. The SWB Berlinetta won Ferrari the GT class of the 1961 Constructor's Championship. Also won 1960, 1961 and 1962 Tour de France Automobile before giving ground to the GTO's.

In 2004, Sports Car International placed the 250 GT SWB seventh on a list of Top Sports Cars of the 1960s, and Motor Trend Classic placed it fifth on a list of the ten "Greatest Ferraris of all time".

=== 250 GT California Spyder SWB ===
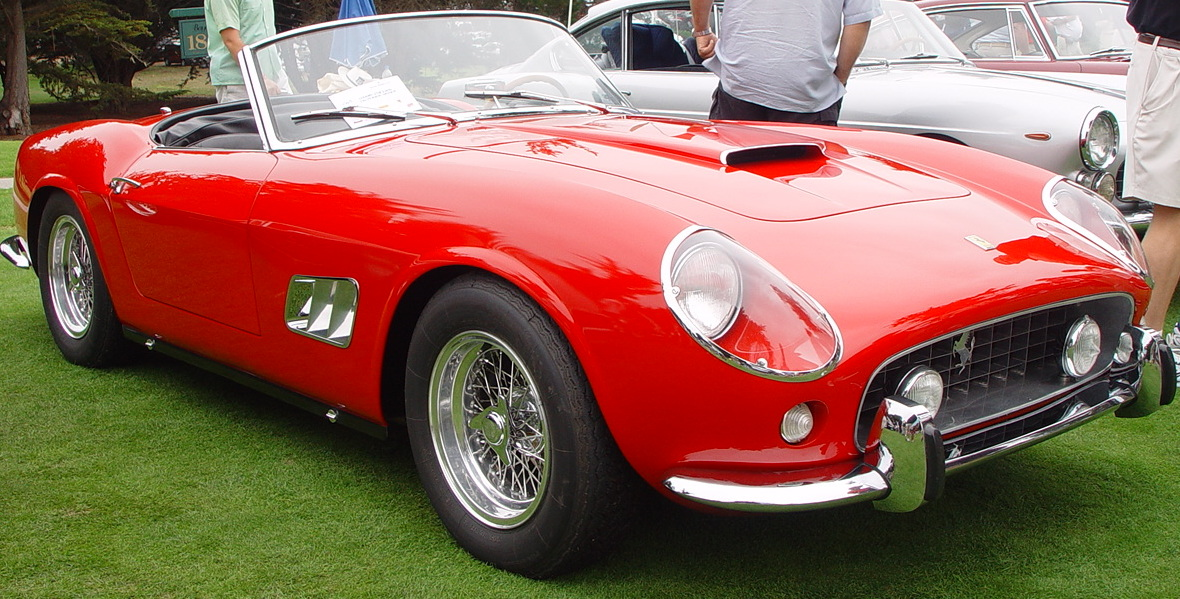
Ferrari 250 GT California Spyder SWB

In 1959, Ferrari gave the 250 GT Berlinetta sharper handling, reducing its wheelbase (Short Wheelbase, or SWB) from 2,600 mm to 2,400 mm. In 1960, Scaglietti unveiled the 250 GT California Spyder SWB at the Geneva Motor Show, its body pulled more tautly over this updated chassis. Like the 250 GT Berlinetta SWB on which it was based, the revised Spyder also received disc brakes and a 280 PS (206 kW; 276 hp) version of the three-litre V12. About 55 were built.

The switch to the 2400 mm chassis of the 250 GT Berlinetta SWB lowered the body by 30 mm, but an easier way to tell the "passo lungo" (LWB) version from the "passo corto" (SWB) version of the California Spyder is to look at the hood scoop and the vents on sides of the front bumpers. The hood scoop is much lower on the SWB version.

A custom-built fibreglass-bodied replica of a 1961–1963 250 GT California Spyder, was featured in the film Ferris Bueller's Day Off. Three 1985 Modena Spyders (two running and one shell for destruction) were built on custom frames for the film by Modena Design & Development. One of the running models was sold back to Modena for restoration and in April 2018 became the 22nd vehicle added to the National Historic Vehicle Register.

A 1961 SWB that had been owned by James Coburn was sold for £5.5 million to radio DJ Chris Evans.

A barn-find 1961 SWB owned by French actor Alain Delon while he was making the 1964 film Les Felins with Jane Fonda sold for US$15.9 million in February 2015.

On March 11, 2016, at the Omni Amelia Island Plantation, a 1961 SWB sold for US$17.16 million at auction.

=== 250 GT/E ===
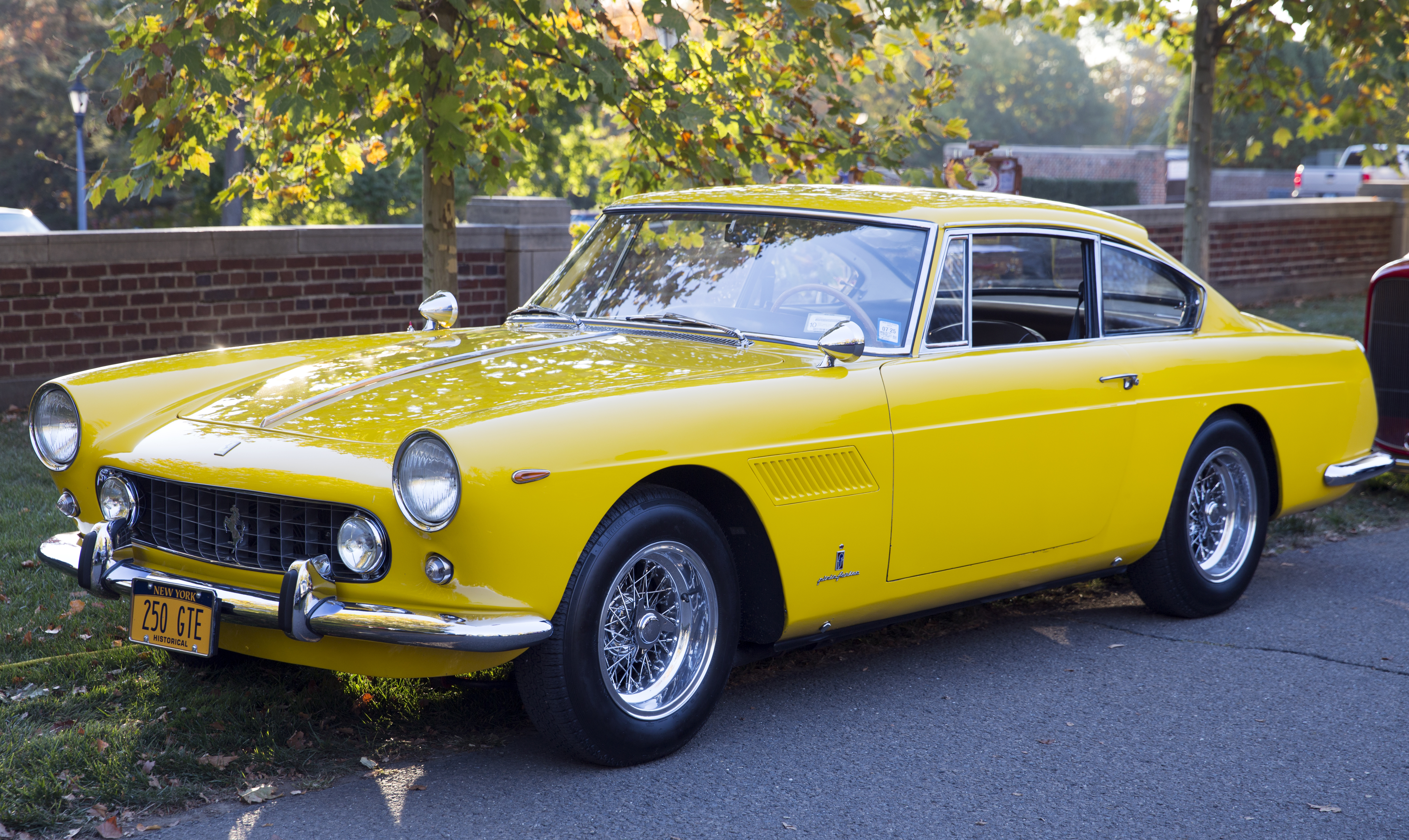
1961 250 GTE (Series I)

The LWB 250 GT theme was expanded with the 2+2 model 250 GT/E, the first large-production four-seat Ferrari (earlier four-seaters were made in very small numbers). Interior space was increased by moving the engine forward in the chassis. The rear seats were suitable for children but small for adults. The standard wheels used on series 1 were the Borrani RW3591, the series 2 and 3 were fitted with the Borrani RW3690 as a standard.

Engine output was listed at 240 PS (177 kW; 237 hp). A GTE was famously donated to the Rome Police department, to celebrate their work against the Mafia. It was crashed almost immediately and replaced and served until 1968, with drivers receiving training at Maranello. The Series 2 arrived in 1961 and received additional gauges and some other interior changes including a revised ventilation system. The Series 3 model appeared at Geneva in 1963 (production having started towards the end of 1962) and received external changes: the headlight bezels were thicker, the auxiliary lights were moved outboard of the grille, and the multi-lens tail lights were changed for single-piece units. The rear bumpers were also lightly reshaped.

955 GT/Es were constructed by Pinin Farina with the initial prototypes built in 1959. The car was formally introduced at the October 1960 Paris Motor Show, with production continuing until 1963 over three series. 299 of the first series were built, followed by 356 Series 2 cars, and finally 300 of the third series. The model was followed by the visually similar 330 America, which shared the 250 GT/E's chassis but used the larger 4.0-litre engine of the 330 series.

The large production run of the GT/E was a major contributor to Ferrari's financial well-being in the early 1960s. MSRP of the GT/E was $11,500.

=== 250 GT Berlinetta Lusso ===
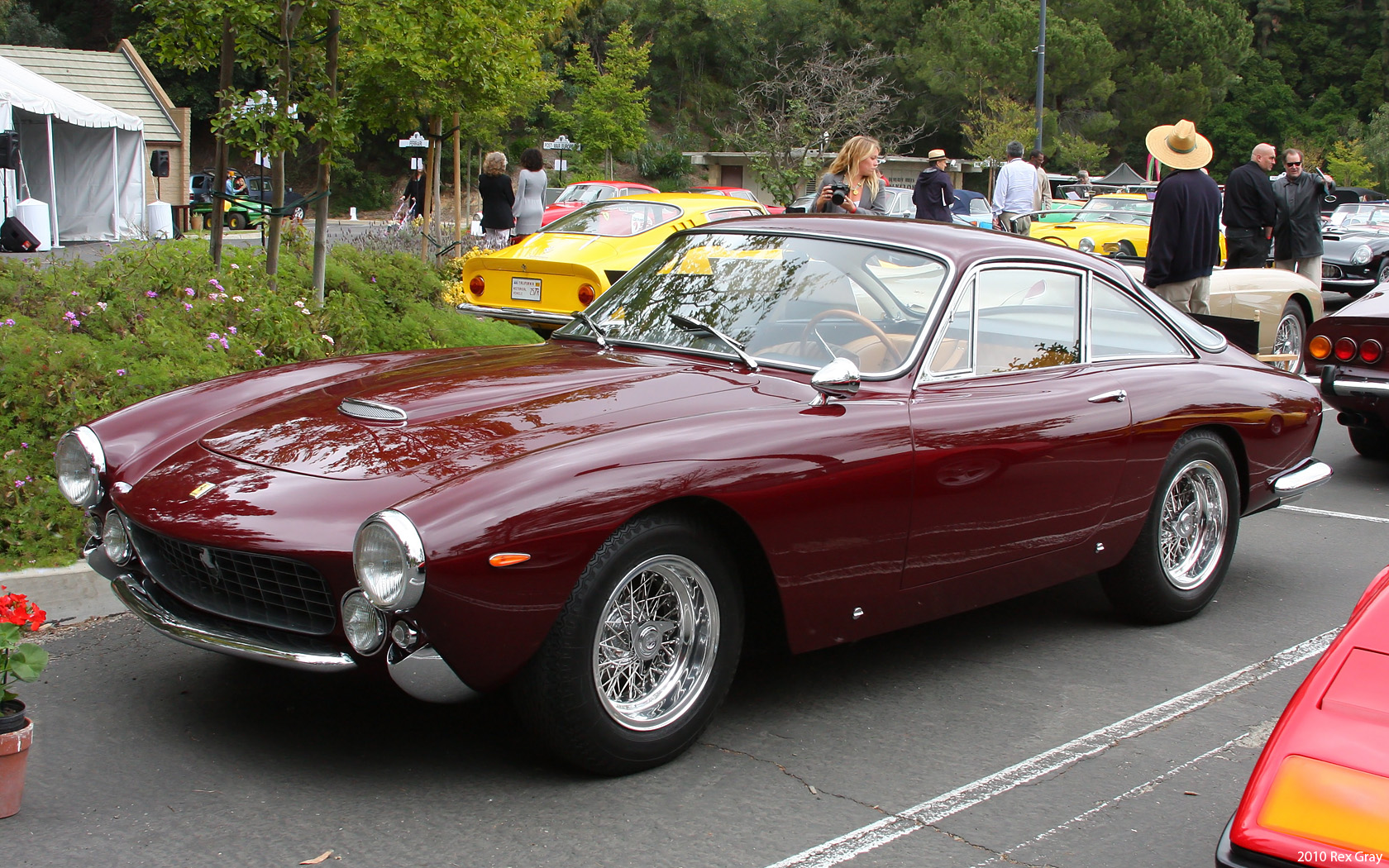
1964 250 GT Berlinetta Lusso

Pininfarina updated the 250 GT with the GT Lusso or GTL. Introduced at the 1962 Paris Motor Show, the car had flowing lines and a fastback shape typical of the GT cars of the mid-1960s. The engine was the 250 GTO's Tipo 168 with 240 PS (177 kW; 237 hp) and three Weber 36DCS carburettors.

Built by Scaglietti, the Lusso continued through 1964 with few modifications.

Rock star Eric Clapton owned one, and an example that had been owned by Steve McQueen sold at auction for $2.3 million on 16 August 2007.

In 2004, Sports Car International placed the 250 GT Lusso tenth on a list of Top Sports Cars of the 1960s. Steve Boone, a member of the Rock and Roll Hall of Fame with the group Lovin' Spoonful owned chassis number #4237, which was stolen from a repair shop in Queens, New York and never found.

== Place in Lamborghini history ==
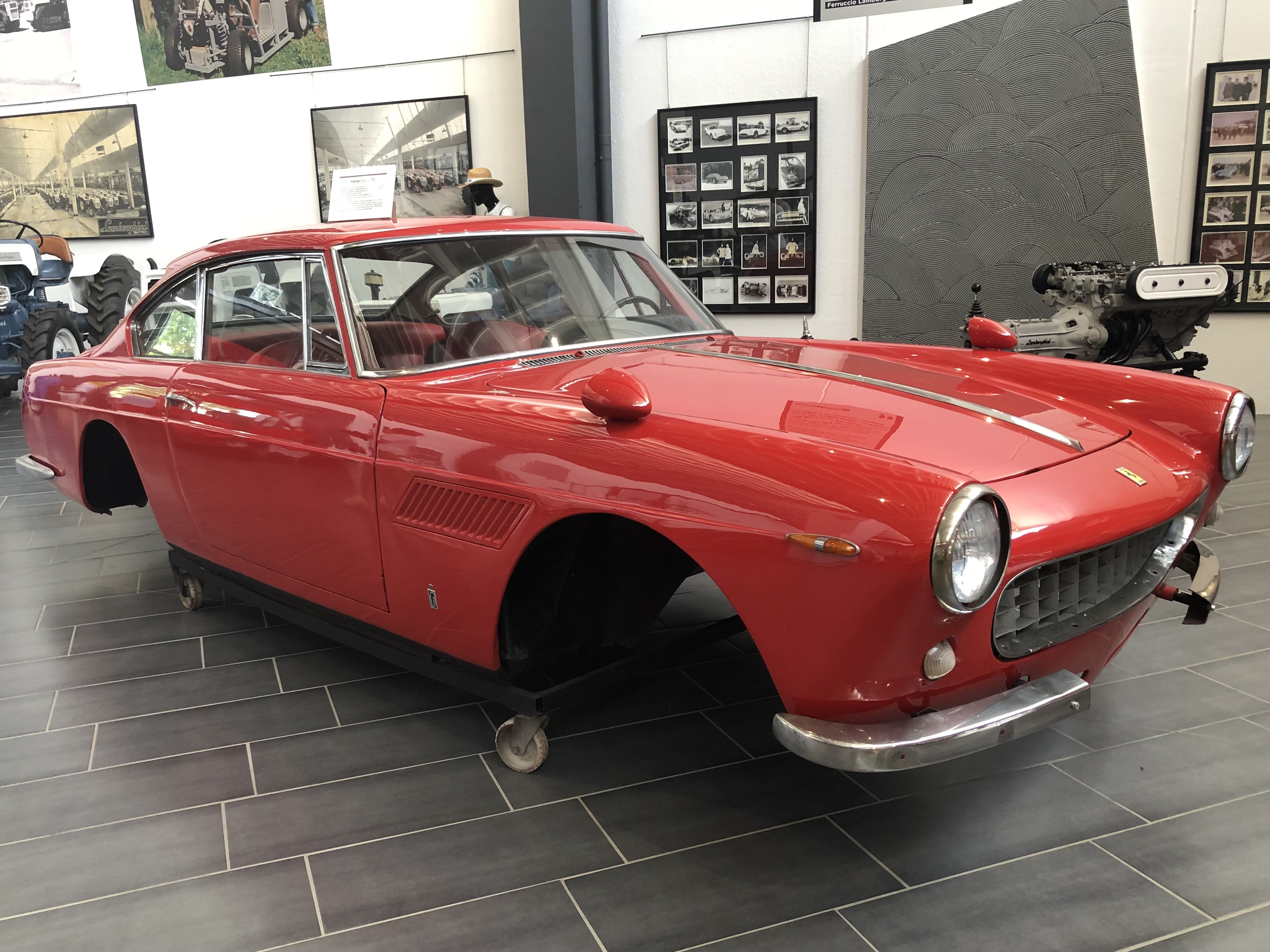
Ferrari 250 GTE previously owned by Ferruccio Lamborghini in the Museo Ferruccio Lamborghini

Tractor manufacturer Ferruccio Lamborghini owned several Ferrari 250s. His frustration with Enzo Ferrari's response to his complaints about frequent clutch problems was key to his decision to make his own cars. He later hired ex-Ferrari engineers to design and develop them.

== See also ==
- Ferrari 250 GT Drogo - the "Breadvan", a 250 SWB modified by Giotto Bizzarrini and Piero Drogo for Giovanni Volpi.
