= Sports Car International =

American automobile magazine

- Sports Car International, March 2006
- Editor-in-Chief: Erik Gustafson (until 2008)
- Former editors: Jay Lamm, Mark Ewing, D. Randy Riggs
- Categories: Automotive
- Frequency: Monthly
- Founded: 1986
- Final issue: November 2008
- Company: Ross Periodicals Inc.
- Country: United States
- Language: English

Sports Car International (SCI) was an automobile magazine published in the United States from 1986 to 2008 by Ross Periodicals Inc, first in Newport Beach, but then later in Novato, California.

== History ==
The magazine was unabashedly enthusiast-oriented, assuming a good knowledge of sports cars, racing, and automotive history. The magazine was originally edited by Mark Ewing. In the 1990s, (after the move from Newport Beach to Northern California) Jay Lamm served as editor; Lamm had worked at other publications, including Autoweek, and had written books on cars like the Mazda Miata. In 1994, SCI became the first magazine publication to go all-digital in its printing process. In March 1997, D. Randy Riggs took over as Editor-in-Chief, and newsstand sales were increased. He left the magazine in April 2001. In 2006, Erik Gustafson served as editor, and upgraded the publication's layout, editorial style, and format to compete directly with rival top automotive publications.

The magazine ceased publication with the November 2008 edition due to cost factors such as a lack of advertising revenue. The publisher stated that all subscribers would ride out their subscription with Excellence, a magazine focused on Porsche automobiles. For those who already have subscriptions to Excellence and SCI, Forza, a Ferrari magazine would be the substitute.

The first magazine ever to be produced using computer to plate (CTP) process in 1994, by Publishers Press Inc.

== See also ==
- Excellence (magazine)
