= Excellence (magazine) =

Excellence: The Magazine About Porsche (known simply as Excellence and originally named Porsche Magazine) Is a magazine published by Ross Periodicals for owners and fans of Porsche cars. The magazine was started in 1986. It is published eight times a year in California.
