= Duesenberg =

American engine and automobile manufacturer

Coordinates: 39°46′00″N 86°11′17″W

Duesenberg Automobile & Motors Company, Inc.
- Industry: Automobile manufacturing; Engine manufacturing
- Predecessor: Duesenberg Motors Company (1913–1919)
- Founded: Indianapolis, Indiana, U.S. (1920)
- Founders: August Duesenberg; Fred Duesenberg
- Defunct: 1937; 89 years ago
- Fate: Dissolved
- Headquarters: Auburn, Indiana, U.S.
- Key people: August Duesenberg (co-founder); Fred Duesenberg (co-founder); Errett Lobban Cord (owner from 1926 to 1937)
- Products: Model A; Model X; Model J
- Parent: Auburn Automobile Company

Duesenberg Automobile & Motors Company, Inc. was an American racing and luxury automobile manufacturer founded in Indianapolis, Indiana, by brothers Fred and August Duesenberg in 1920. The company is known for popularizing the straight-eight engine and four-wheel hydraulic brakes. A Duesenberg car was the first American car to win a Grand Prix race, winning the 1921 French Grand Prix. Duesenbergs won the Indianapolis 500 in 1922 (when eight of the top ten finishers were Duesenbergs), 1924, 1925 and 1927. Transportation executive Errett Lobban Cord acquired the Duesenberg corporation in 1926. The company was sold and dissolved in 1937. It was the only automotive company to go bankrupt in the Great Depression and not be rescued by the US government, largely a political move due to New Deal policies avoiding the imagery of helping the richest, despite Duesenberg being the largest employer in Indianapolis at the time.

== History ==
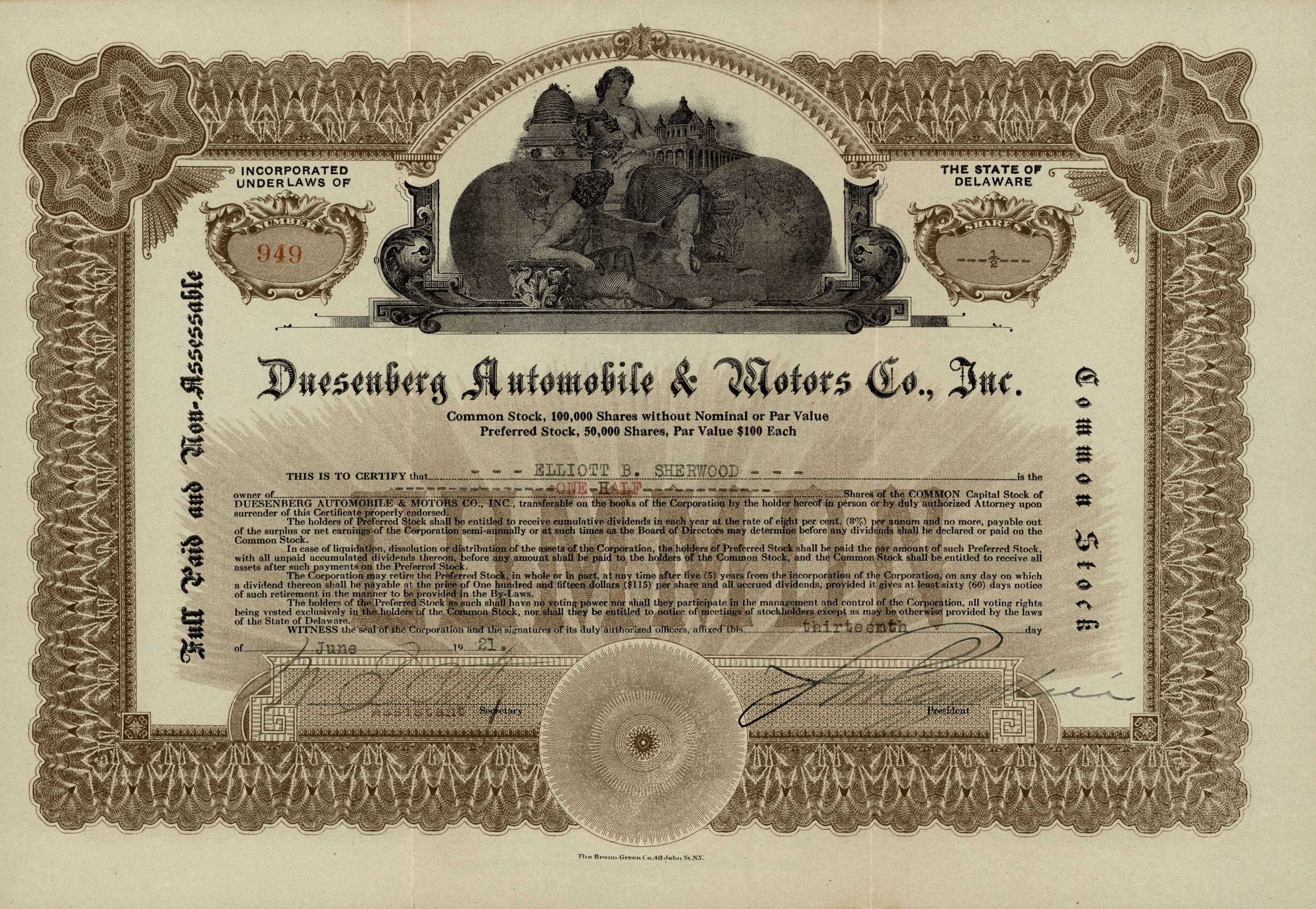
Half a share, issued in June 1921

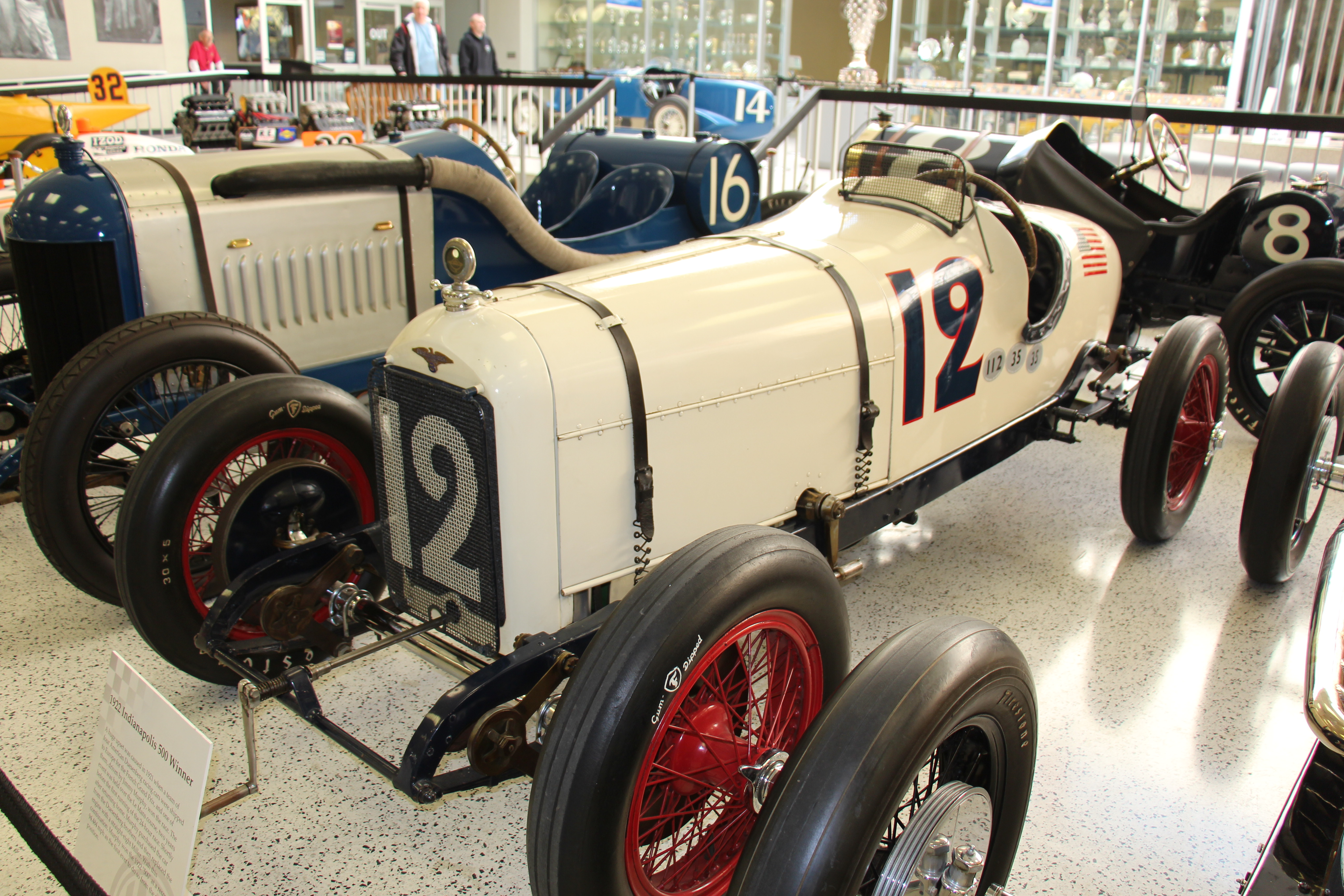
The Murphy Special, in which Jimmy Murphy won the 1921 French Grand Prix and the 1922 Indianapolis 500

Fred and August Duesenberg began designing engines in the early 1900s, after Fred became involved with bicycle racing. The brothers designed a vehicle in 1905, and they formed the Mason Motor Car Company in 1906 with funds from lawyer Edward R. Mason in Des Moines, Iowa. F. L. and Elmer Maytag acquired a majority stake in the company and renamed it the Maytag-Mason Automobile Company until they sold their stake in 1912.

The Duesenberg brothers then moved to Saint Paul, Minnesota, where they established the Duesenberg Motors Company in 1913. Eddie Rickenbacker drove the first Duesenberg-designed vehicle to race at the Indianapolis 500 in 1914, placing tenth. During World War I, the Duesenbergs designed and built aircraft engines in Elizabeth, New Jersey. A Duesenberg driven by Tommy Milton won the 1919 Elgin Trophy. In 1919, the brothers sold their Saint Paul factories.

In 1920, the Duesenberg brothers relocated to Indianapolis, Indiana, where they founded the Duesenberg Automobile & Motors Company, manufacturing the Duesenberg Model A. The brothers assumed engineering roles after signing over the naming rights and patents for Duesenberg engines to promoters Newton E. Van Zandt and Luther M. Rankin. The first Model A was commissioned by Hawaiian businessman and politician Samuel Northrup Castle. The car had a 260-cubic-inch (4.3 L) straight-eight engine that output 88 horsepower (66 kW), the largest engine in a commercially available vehicle at the time, and was the first to have hydraulic brakes on all its wheels.

The company continued to build race cars as well, and a Duesenberg driven by Jimmy Murphy won the 1921 French Grand Prix, the first American car to do so. Duesenberg cars also performed well at the Indianapolis 500 during the 1920s, winning the race in 1922, 1924, 1925 and 1927.

Van Zandt left the company in 1921, after which it struggled financially and entered receivership in 1924. Duesenberg was purchased by Errett Lobban Cord in 1926. August's role in the passenger-car side of the business declined after Cord's takeover, and August worked primarily in Duesenberg's racing division after 1926, designing all Duesenberg race cars built from that year until the company's dissolution. Two years later, Cord had the Duesenbergs make a new model to "outclass" all other American cars. In 1929, the company began selling the Duesenberg Model J, which was powered by a 265-horsepower (198 kW) straight-eight engine. The body and cabin were custom-built by coachbuilders. Prices for the cars ranged from $14,000 to $20,000 at the time.

Duesenbergs were considered to be among the most luxurious American cars ever made. Historian Donald Davidson called them the "most prestigious passenger car" in American history and likened them to an American version of the Rolls-Royce. The vehicles were popular with movie stars, royalty and other wealthy individuals. The company was sold by Cord and dissolved in 1937. The last Duesenberg to be made by the original company was completed in 1940, commissioned by German artist Rudolf Bauer and completed by August Duesenberg after the company had shut down.

In 1998, The Franklin Mint started producing collectible scale models of Duesenberg Coupé Simone, a fictitious custom-made luxury car allegedly manufactured in the late 1930s.

=== Revivals ===
Several unsuccessful attempts were made to revive the Duesenberg name. August Duesenberg failed to restart the company in 1947, and an attempt by his son, Fritz, and car designer Virgil Exner to revive the brand failed after the production of one concept car in 1966. In 1970, Bernard Miller bought the Duesenberg Corporation and produced the SSJ model from templates taken from the original 1935 SSJ La Grande body. The body was aluminum over ash. There were grand plans for over 300 SSJ's to be produced but over the company's life span of 1970-1974 only 8 were completed.

=== Duesenberg II ===
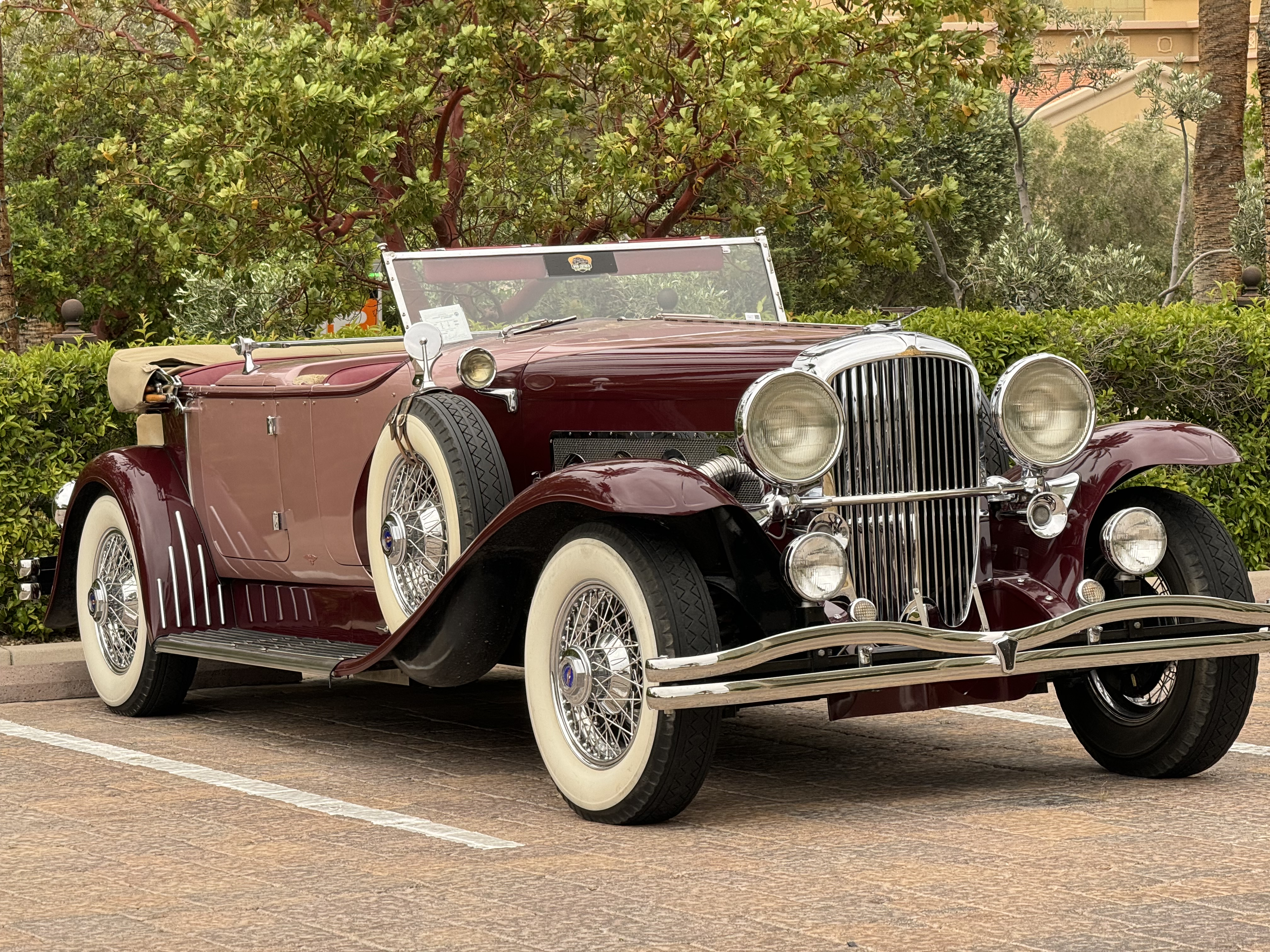
1982 Duesenberg II - Royalton Dual Cowl Phaeton

In 1978, Elite Heritage Motors acquired the trademark for Duesenberg and started producing the handmade "Duesenberg II" in Elroy, Wisconsin, under the name Duesenberg Motors Company. The "Duesenberg II" retained the styling of the cars from the 1920s and 1930s, but included some modern updates, such as stereo systems, air conditioning, and an automatic transmission. Each "Duesenberg II" was precisely measured using an original example as a template. Over 5,000 manhours of craftsmanship was put into each car. In 1981, a new Duesenberg II Royalton had a base price of $125,000. The company produced several models, including the Torpedo sedan and phaeton, and the Murphy roadster. The factory produced a total of 67 cars before closing in 2001.

=== Duesenberg Custom Coach ===
In 1996, the Duesenberg name was revived by Minnesota-based company Duesenberg Custom Coach. Designed by Jeff Teague, the new 'Duesenberg Torpedo Coupe' would feature a radical axial twelve-cylinder engine layout known as a 'Cylindrical Energy Module' or CEM. Adapted from a firefighting pump design by car designer Eddie Paul, the CEM would rotate on an axis, sucking in fuel and providing self lubrication and was capable of running on either petrol or diesel. The powerplant would also allegedly create only 1/6th of the heat of a conventional engine, meaning air cooling would be sufficient. A Mercedes V12 engine was planned to be used if this powerplant prove to be too costly or difficult to implement. Alongside this, the Torpedo coupe would be the first production automobile to use Bose electromagnetic suspension, alongside incorporating a number of new innovative technologies.

Despite plans of producing between 25 and 50 units per year, the project never materialised.

== Products ==
=== Model A (1921–1927) ===
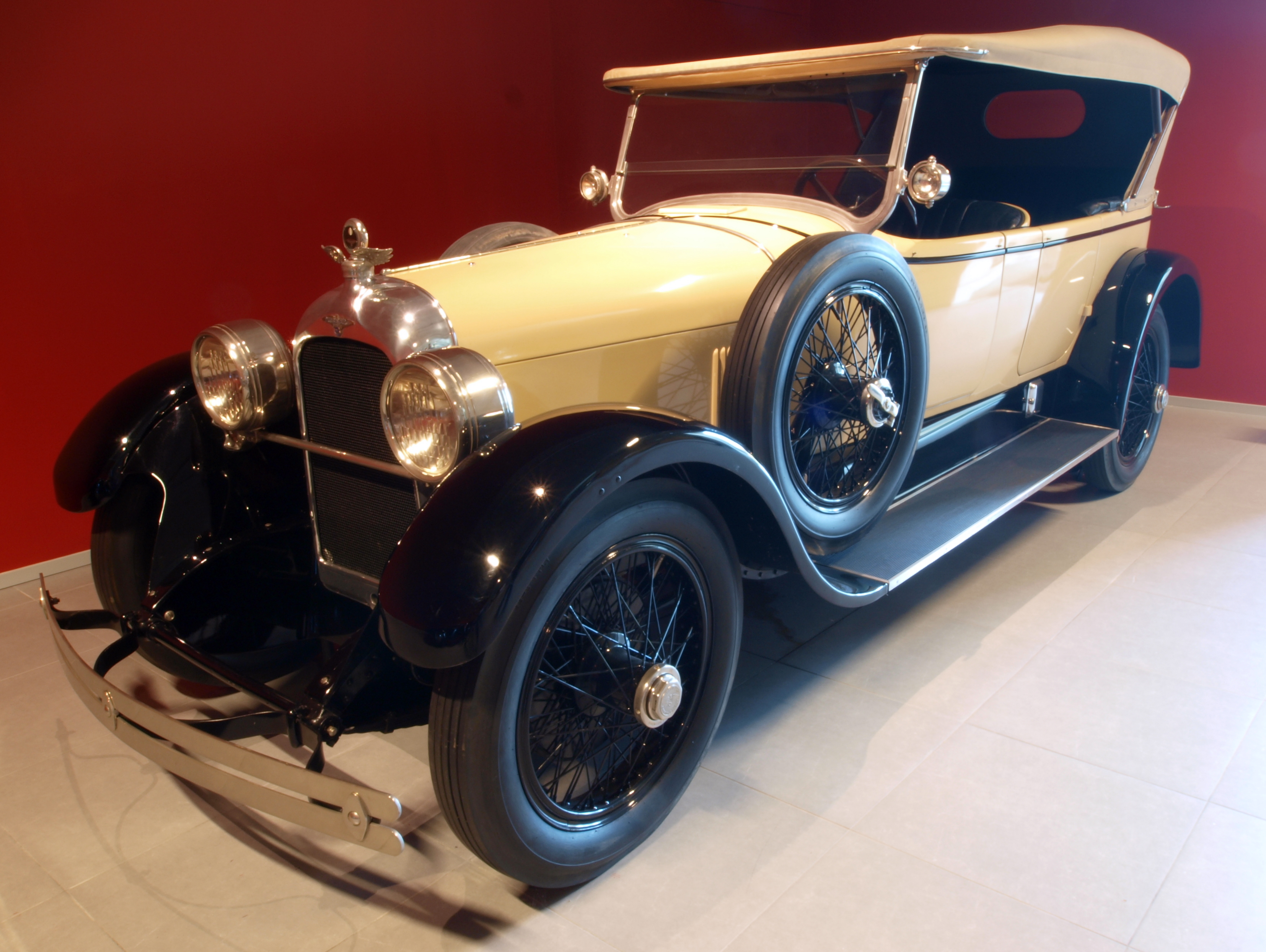
1923 Duesenberg Model A touring car at the Louwman Museum

Duesenberg's first car was the Model A. It is powered by the Duesenberg Straight-8 engine and was the first car to be mass-produced with a straight-eight. The purchase price for a Model A started at $6,500 (equivalent to $123,000 in 2025). The Duesenberg Model A introduced several innovative features, such as an overhead camshaft, four-valve cylinder heads, and the first four-wheel hydraulic brakes offered on a passenger car. It had the largest engine of any consumer vehicle at the time of its production.

The Duesenberg Model A experienced various delays going from prototype to production. Deliveries to dealers did not start until December 1921. Sales lagged, and Duesenberg could not meet a 100-vehicles-per-month quota as the Indianapolis plant struggled to roll out one a day. In 1922, no more than 150 Duesenberg Model As were manufactured, with only a total of 650 units sold over a period of six years.

=== Model X (1926–1927) ===
The Model X is a sportier version of the Model A with a heavier and longer (136 in (3,500 mm) wheelbase) chassis and 100 hp (75 kW) engine that enabled it to reach 100 mph (161 km/h). The most notable differences between the A and the X were that the latter had hypoid differentials and all its valves were on one side.

The Duesenberg Model X chassis is an upgrade over the Model A chassis, offering a reworked 260-cubic-inch (4.3 L) straight-8 engine, an overhead cam, with a new crankshaft, revised valve train, improved pistons and superior intake manifold. Power is 100 hp, which made driving at 100 mph (160 km/h) possible. The chassis length increased to 136 inches (3.5 m), with additional reinforcements. Improved leaf springs are mounted above the frame rails, thus, lowering the center of gravity. The Duesenberg Model X chassis is the rarest Duesenberg street production chassis ever made, with only thirteen ever manufactured. Only five of the Duesenberg Model Xs manufactured are known to have survived.

=== Model J (1928–1937) ===
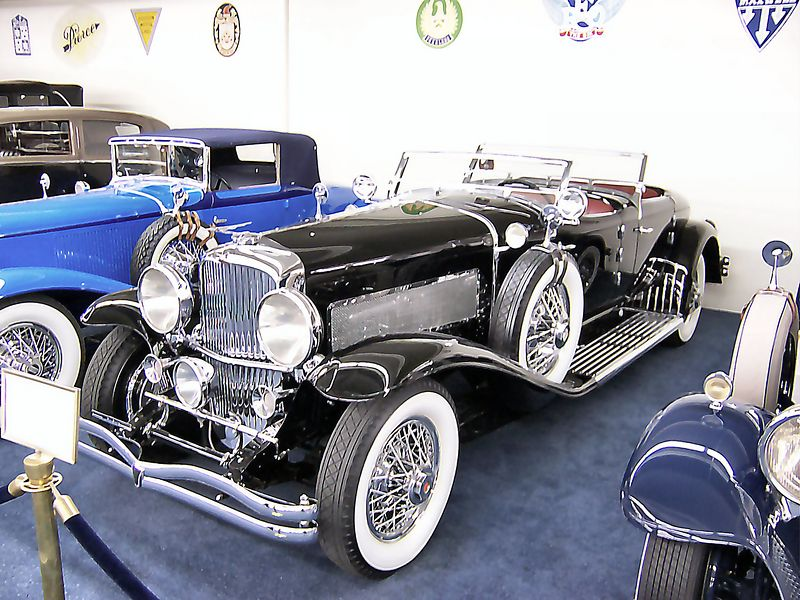
1930 J Walker La Grande Torpedo Phaeton

The first Model J prototype was created in 1927 and the first cars were delivered in 1929, shortly before the onset of the Great Depression. About three hundred Model Js were completed by 1930, short of the original 500-vehicle goal.

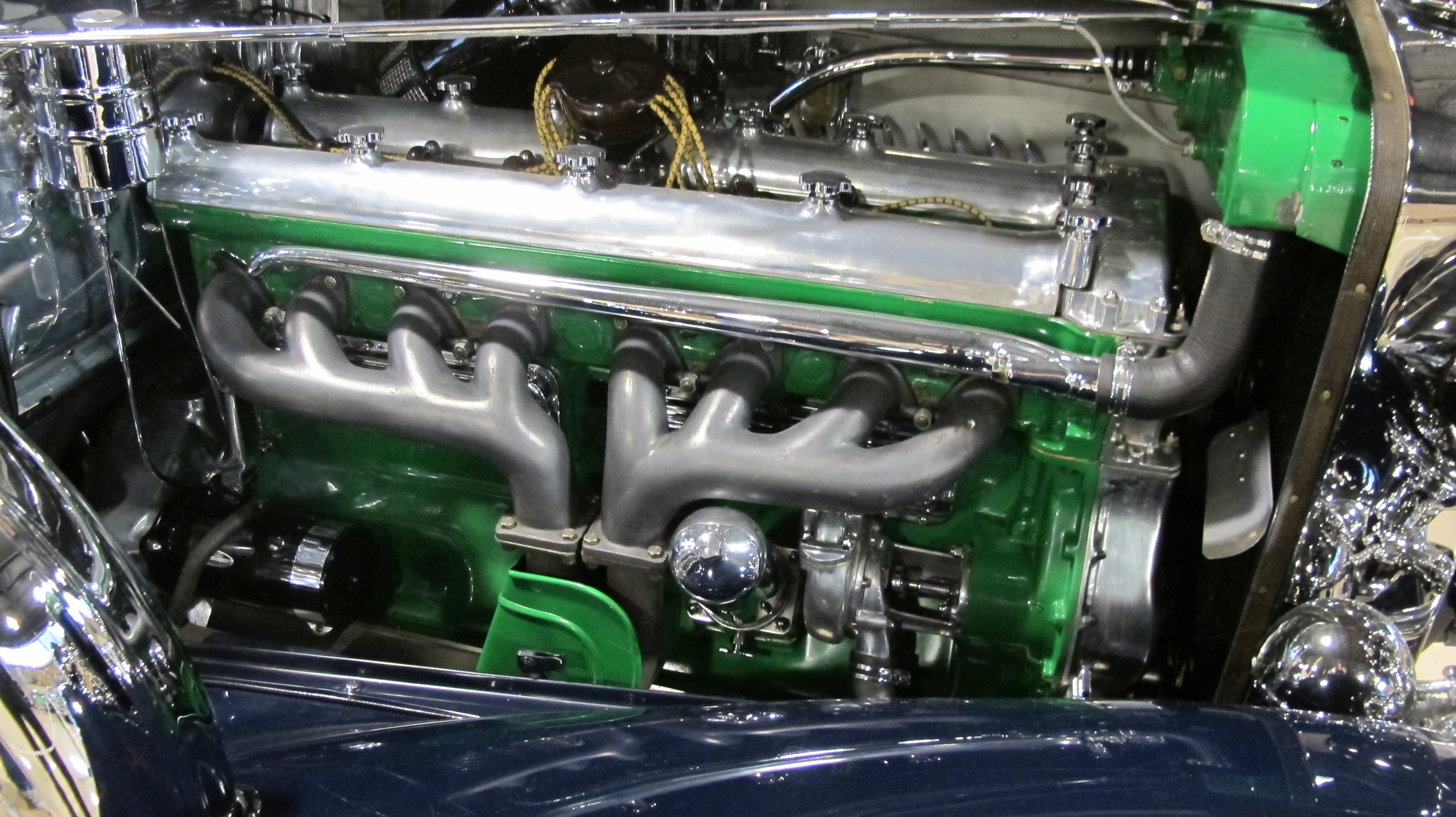
Model J engine

The car's 7 L (420 cu in) engine was based on the company's racing engines of the 1920s and was manufactured by another Cord company, Lycoming. It output 265 horsepower (198 kW), aided by dual overhead camshafts and four valves per cylinder, making it the most powerful car of its time. The Model J was capable of a top speed of 116 mph (187 km/h), and 88 mph (142 km/h) in second gear. Duesenberg historian Randy Ema wrote that the Model J spurred change in engine design, "single-handedly (starting) the horsepower race that drove the number of cylinders from twelve to sixteen," but noted those engines still could not match the Model J's power output.

Only the chassis and engine of the Model J were displayed, as the body and cabin of the car were custom built per custom for luxury vehicles at the time. The company's chief body designer, Gordon Buehrig, designed around half of the Model J bodies, while the remainder were designed by coachbuilders around the world, including Gurney Nutting, Murphy, and Derham, among others.

The J was available in two versions of chassis with a different wheelbase; a longer one (153.54 in (3.90 m)) and a shorter one (about 141.73 in (3.60 m)). There were also other special sizes, like the SSJs with a wheelbase shortened to 125 in (3.18 m) and a few cars with the wheelbase extended to 160 in (4.1 m) and over.

The supercharged Model J, referred to as the SJ, was reported to have reached 104 miles per hour (167 km/h) in second gear and have a top speed of 135–140 miles per hour (217–225 km/h) in third gear. Zero-to-60 mph (97 km/h) times of around eight seconds and 0–100 mph (0–161 km/h) in 17 seconds were reported for the SJ despite having an unsynchronized transmission, at a time when even the best cars of the era were not likely to reach 100 mph (160 km/h). The SJ had a wheelbase of 142.5 in (362 cm). The SJ was introduced in 1932. Only 36 units were built. A special version of the SJ, the Mormon Meteor, broke several land speed records.

Investors in New York City originally supported the Model J, but following the Stock market crash of 1929, the market for Model Js switched to Hollywood stars. The one-off SJ Twenty Grand was produced in 1933 for the Century of Progress World's Fair to represent Duesenberg's automotive progress. Two modified Model Js, known as the SSJ, were produced in 1935 for actors Gary Cooper and Clark Gable. The SSJ reportedly produced 400 hp (298 kW) and could go 0 to 60 mph (0 to 97 km/h) in less than 8 seconds. Cooper's SSJ sold for $22 million in 2018, making it the most expensive American car ever sold at auction at the time. About 378 of 481 Model Js of all types still existed as of 2002.

== See also ==
- Auburn Automobile
- Cord Automobile
- Auburn Cord Duesenberg Automobile Museum
- Duesenberg Straight-8 engine
  - Duesenberg 16-valve straight-4 aero engine
