= August Duesenberg =

American pioneer automobile manufacturer (1879–1955)

August Samuel Duesenberg
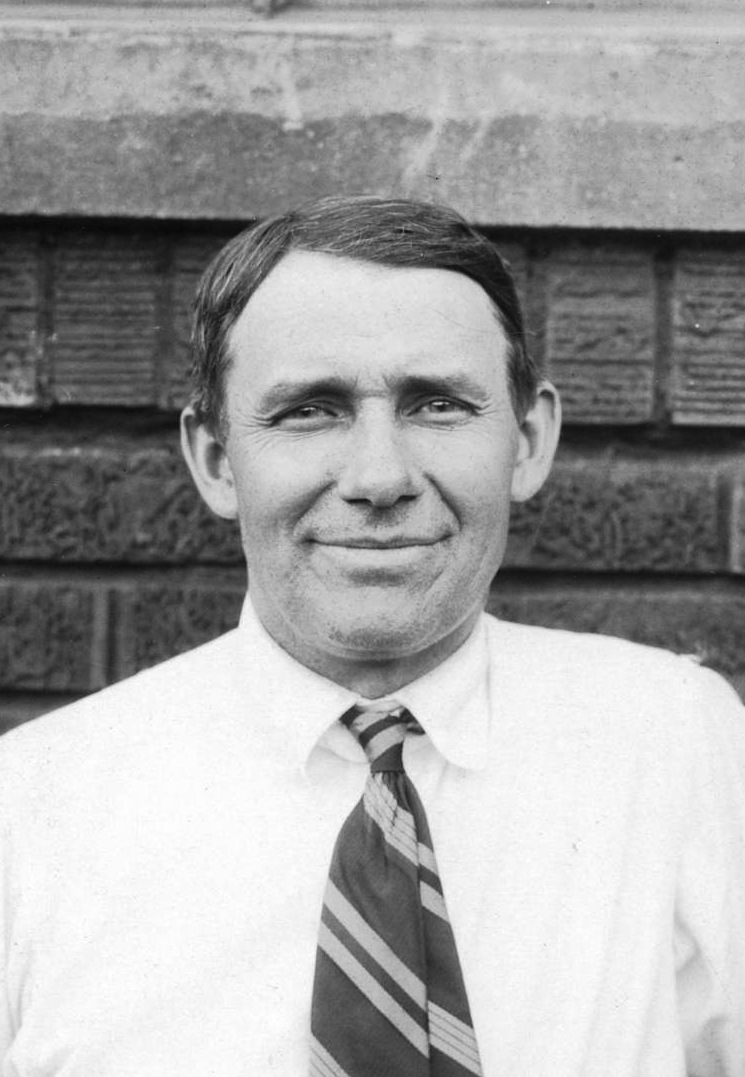
- August Duesenberg in 1925
- Born: August Samuel Düsenberg; December 12, 1879; Lippe, Germany
- Died: January 18, 1955 (aged 75); Indianapolis, Indiana, U.S.
- Resting place: Crown Hill Cemetery and Arboretum, Section Community Mausoleum, Lot MM-D-2; 39.8274766°N 86.1730061°W
- Occupations: Early automobile manufacturer and racer
- Known for: Duesenberg automobile
- Awards: Motorsports Hall of Fame

August Samuel Duesenberg (December 12, 1879 – January 18, 1955) was a German-born American automobile and engine manufacturer who built American racing and racing engines that set speed records at Daytona Beach, Florida, in 1920; won the French Grand Prix in 1921; and won Indianapolis 500-mile races (1922, 1924, 1925, and 1927), as well as setting one-hour and 24-hour speed records on the Bonneville Salt Flats in Utah in 1935. He also shared with his older brother, Frederick S. "Fred" Duesenberg, patents filed in 1913 and renewed in 1918 for a four-cylinder engine design and the Duesenberg Straight 8 (an eight-cylinder engine with a single, overhead camshaft).

In 1913 the brothers founded the Duesenberg Motor Company, Incorporated, which was subsequently sold, and in 1920 joined with other financial investors to establish the Duesenberg Automobiles and Motor Company, which manufactured passenger cars in Indianapolis, Indiana, from 1921 until 1937. Augie Duesenberg initially worked as the plant manager, while Fred Duesenberg was the chief design engineer and later in the 1920s served as the company's president. The Duesenberg Model A, the brothers' first, mass-produced vehicle was manufactured between 1921 and 1927. Although the Model A was technologically advanced, it proved to be unpopular with car buyers because of its high cost and unstylish exterior. Following Errett L. Cord's acquisition of the Duesenberg company in 1926, Augie Duesenberg focused on the Duesenberg Brothers, a separate racing business established in August 1920, and was not involved in the Indianapolis-based automaker's production of luxury passenger cars.

== Early life and education ==
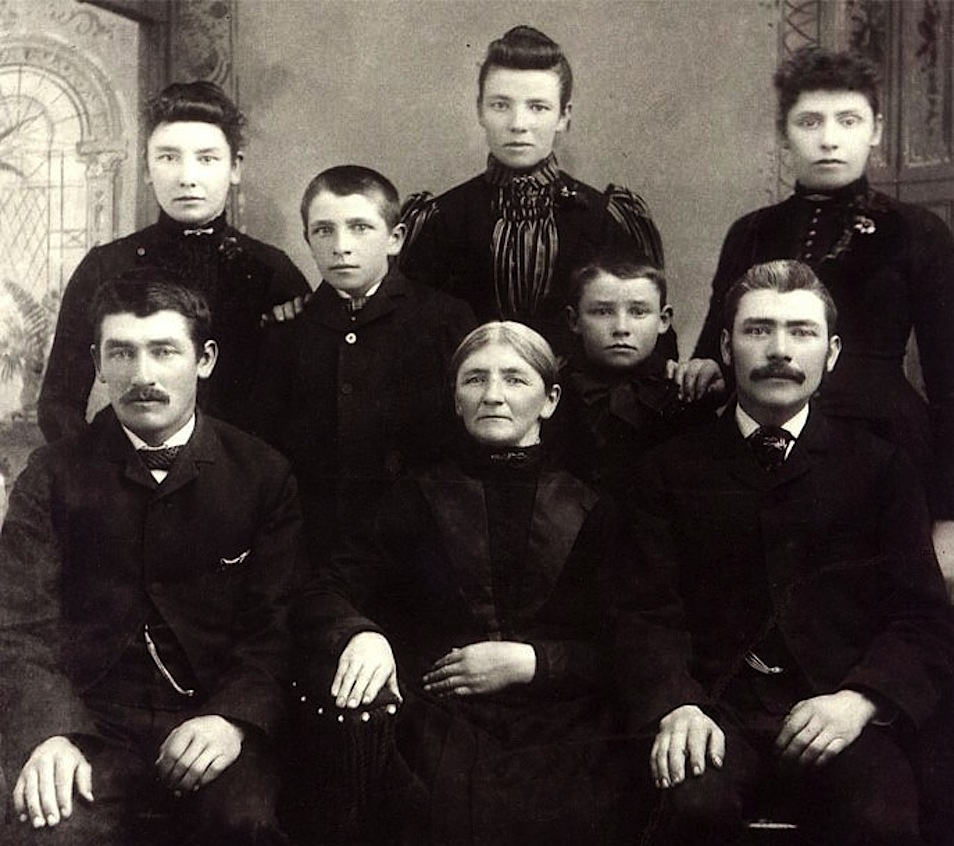
Duesenberg Family (Fred, second row, left; August, second row, right)

August "Augie" Samuel Düsenberg was born on December 12, 1879, in Kirchheide, Lippe-Detmold Germany, to Konrad (or Conrad) and Luise Düsenberg. August was the youngest of the family's seven children (four boys and three girls). August's father died in 1881, and his older brother, Henry, emigrated to America in 1884. Luise Düsenberg sold the family farm in Germany in 1885 and emigrated to the United States with her other children, including August, who was about five years old, and his brother, Friederich "Fred" Düsenberg. The family joined Henry and settled in Iowa, where the eldest son, Conrad, purchased a 200-acre (81-hectare) farm in Floyd County, Iowa, near Rockford. The spelling of the family's surname became Duesenberg following their emigration to the United States, where August was nicknamed Augie. He attended public schools during his youth in Iowa and had no further classroom training. His mechanical and manufacturing skills were largely self-taught. During his youth, he also developed an interest in bicycling, along with his older brother Fred.

== Marriage and family ==
August Duesenberg married Gertrude Pike of Garner, Iowa, in 1906. They had two children, a son, Frederick P. "Fritz" Duesenberg, and a daughter, Dorothy Duesenberg. Fritz Duesenberg died in 1974 and is buried at Crown Hill Cemetery in Indianapolis, Indiana.

== Career ==
=== Early years ===
In the 1890s, Augie Duesenberg began building and racing bicycles in Iowa with his older brother Fred. Around 1900, they began experimenting with designing and building internal-combustion, gasoline-powered engines and installing them on bicycles to create motorcycles. Augie and Fred operated a bicycle repair shop in Rockford, but the business went bankrupt in 1903. A short time later the two brothers established another bicycle and motorcycle shop in Garner, Iowa, but Fred left the business in 1903 to pursue other mechanical and auto manufacturing training in Wisconsin and in Iowa.

In 1906, Augie's brother, Fred, met Edward Mason, an Iowa lawyer who provided the brothers with financing to manufacture cars. The business was incorporated the Mason Motor Car Company in April 1906 and began manufacturing cars four months later. Augie worked as a patternmaker at the company; Fred was a superintendent and designer. After State Senator F. L. Maytag, the future Maytag washing machine and appliance magnate, acquired majority interest in the company, it reorganized in 1909 as the Maytag-Mason Motor Company and manufactured cars at Waterloo, Iowa. Maytag and Mason lacked experience in the car manufacturing business and the Maytag-Mason partnership was dissolved in 1912. The Mason Motor Car Company ceased production the following year.

Around 1910 Augie and Fred Duesenberg began working on their "walking beam" four-cylinder engine, which the Duesenberg Straight-8 engine later replaced. The brothers shared the patents for both engines, which were filed in 1913 and renewed in 1918. In 1913, the Duesenberg brothers moved to Saint Paul, Minnesota, where they continued to design and build automobile and marine engines and racecars. The two brothers contracted with Commodore James A. Pugh of Chicago, Illinois, to build a racing-boat engine and used the proceeds from the contract to further develop their racing business. The two brothers founded the Duesenberg Motor Company, Incorporated, in June 1913.

=== Early auto racing ===
The Duesenberg brothers began racing bicycles and motorcycles in the 1890s and turned to auto racing after the turn of the twentieth century. Along with other automobile makers, they used the Indianapolis Motor Speedway as a test track for their cars. Duesenberg entries participated in Indianapolis 500-mile auto races for nearly twenty years, and were especially active between 1912 and 1932, when Augie served as the team's supervisor and chief mechanic. The first Duesenberg entry in the Indianapolis 500-mile race occurred in 1912. Although their Mason Motor Company-owned racer practiced for the race, it had a mechanical failure and did not compete.

Between 1913 and 1916, the Duesenberg racing team gradually improved its standings in the annual Indianapolis 500-mile race. In the 1913 race, the team took ninth place in the race. In the 1914 race, Eddie Rickenbacker, the future World War I aviation ace, drove a Duesenberg-powered racecar to a tenth-place finish and US$1,400 in prize money. The Duesenberg team also had a twelfth-place finisher that year. In the 1915 race the team took fifth and seventh places, and in the 1916 race rookie driver Wilbur D'Alene finished in second place. Racing at the Indianapolis 500-mile race went on hiatus in 1917 and 1918, when efforts focused on wartime production during World War I. When Indianapolis 500-mile auto races resumed in 1919, the Duesenberg team had mechanical and fuel issues and its entries did not finish the race that year, but the team had better success in the 1920s.

=== World War I-era engine manufacturer ===
In 1917 the Duesenberg Motor Company of Saint Paul, Minnesota, and the Loew-Victor Manufacturing Company of Chicago, Illinois, merged into the Duesenberg Motor Corporation. Fred Duesenberg was its chief engineer and Augie Duesenberg was assistant engineer. The Loew-Victor Company arranged to produce aviation and marine engines for military use for the American, British, Italian, and Russian governments during World War I. A new factory in Elizabeth, New Jersey, was constructed especially for this purpose and the two brothers moved to New York City in 1917 to supervise operations at the new factory.

During the war, the Duesenberg brothers' experience with the Bugatti aircraft engine changed many of their own engineering ideas and led to refinements in their design of the Duesenberg straight eight, an eight-cylinder engine with a single, overhead camshaft. At the end of the war the brothers stopped building aviation and marine engines in Elizabeth, New Jersey, to focus their efforts on development of race cars from a rented space in Newark, New Jersey. In 1919, after the Duesenberg Motor Corporation was sold to John Willys, the brothers completed their work at the company's Minnesota and New Jersey factories and relocated in 1920 to Indianapolis, Indiana, where they established the Duesenberg Automobile and Motors Company with other financial investors.

=== 1920s-era carmaker ===
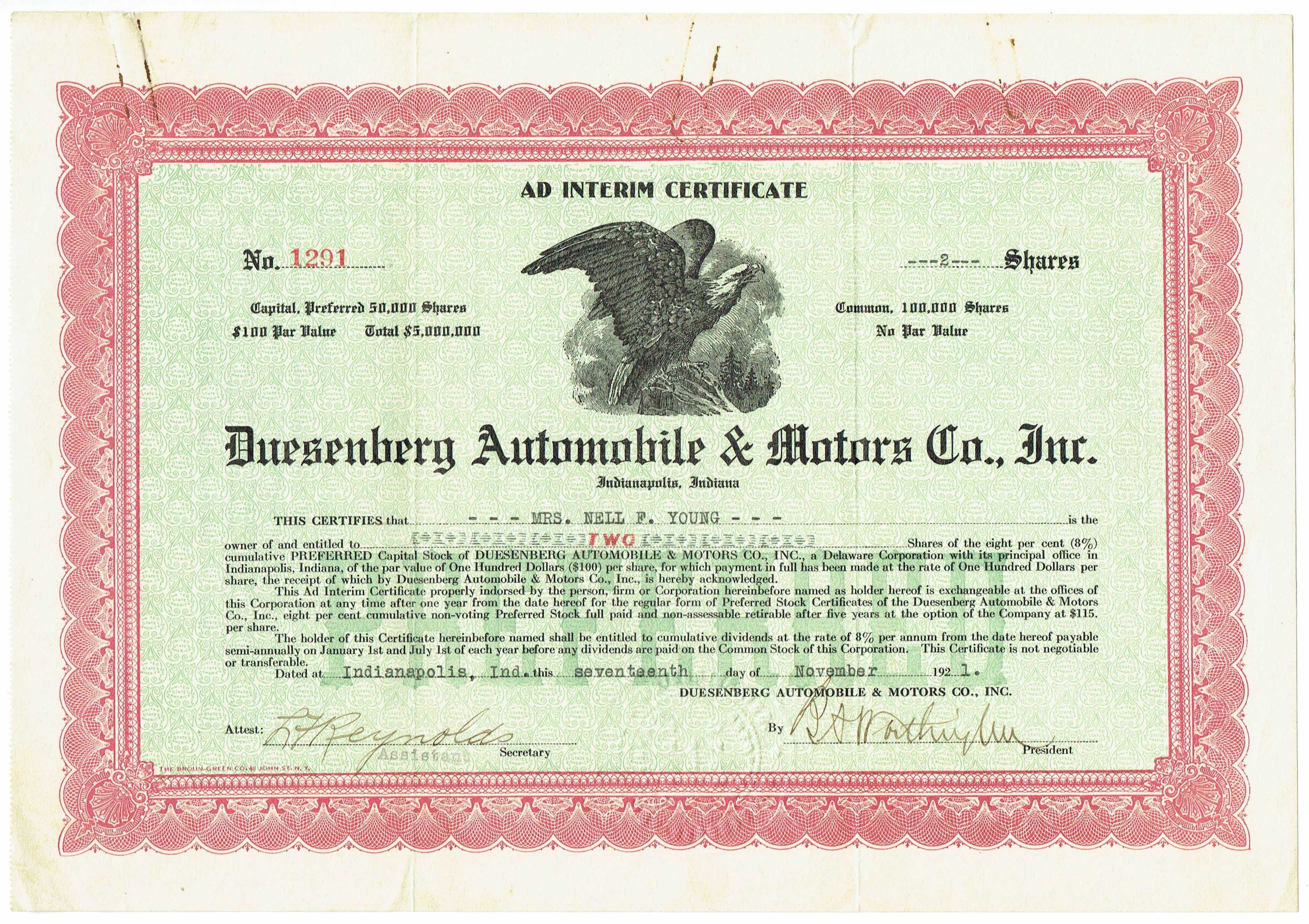
Ad interim share certificate of the Duesenberg Automobile & Motors Co., issued November 17, 1921

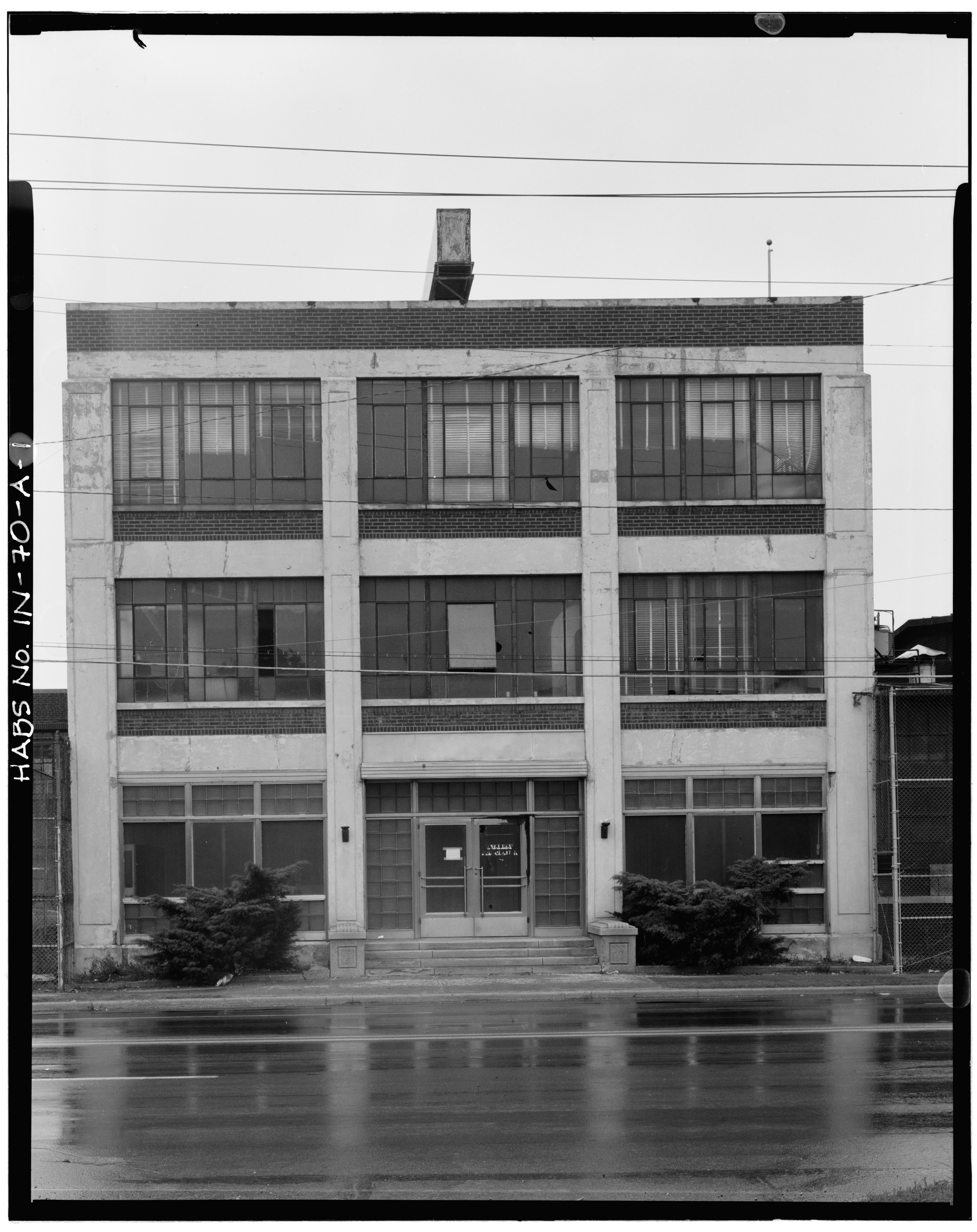
Duesenberg Automobile Company Factory building No. 1, 1501 West Washington Street, Indianapolis, Indiana

While continuing to develop the racing engines in Indianapolis, Augie and Fred Duesenberg along with other financial backers established the Duesenberg Automobile & Motors Company in March 1920. Augie Duesenberg was the plant manager; his brother, Fred, was the chief design engineer who later in the 1920s served as the company's president. Beginning with the Duesenberg Model A in 1921, Duesenberg passenger cars were built with advanced racing-car features at a new manufacturing plant in Indianapolis. The factory at the corner of Washington and Harding Streets was near the Indianapolis Motor Speedway, which was used as a test track. Although the Model A was technologically advanced, the Duesenberg brothers had difficulty selling their first mass-produced vehicle because of its high cost (US$8,500 for the chassis alone) and unstylish exterior design. Production ended on the Model A in 1927.

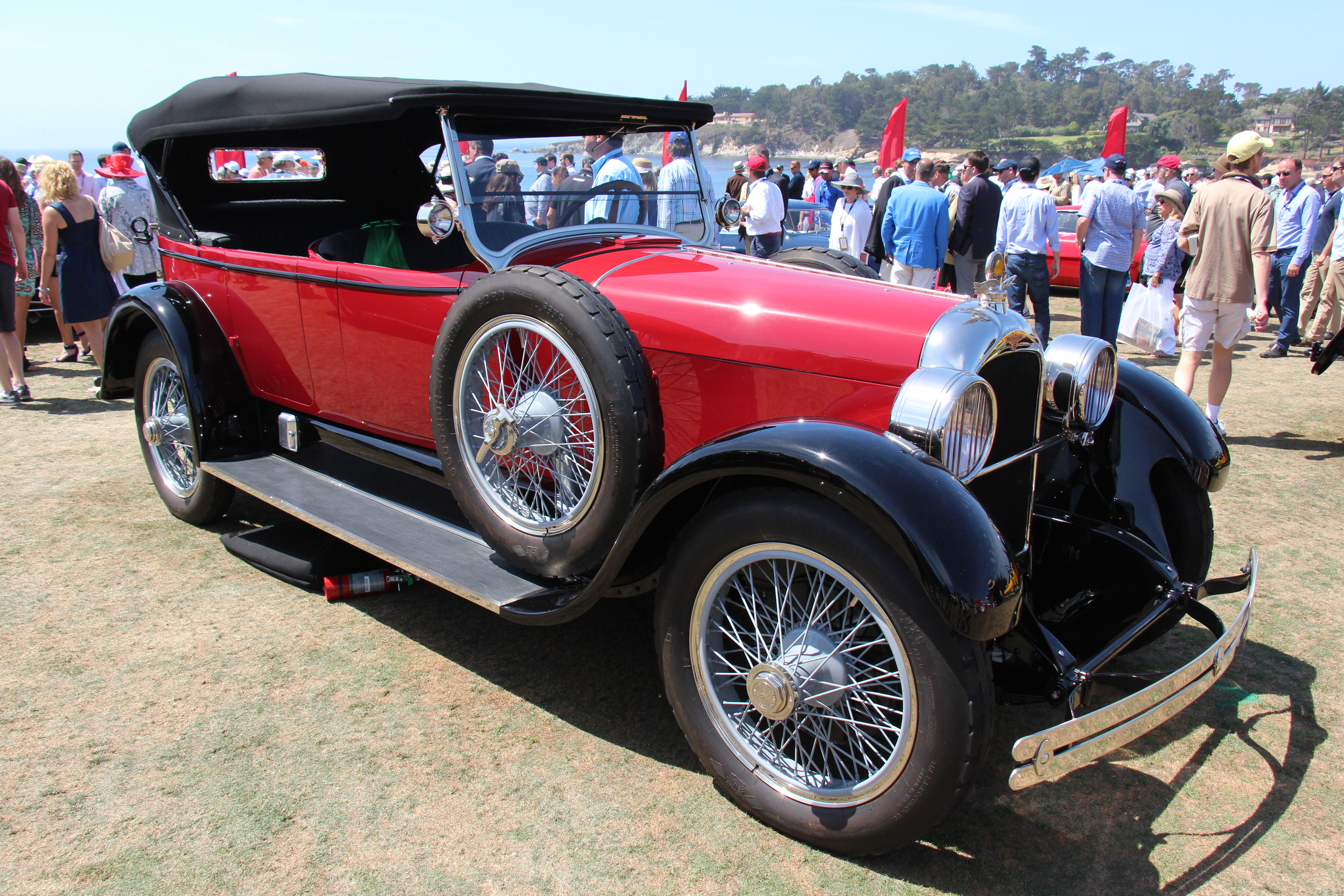
Duesenberg Model A Tourer

A minor shareholder unsuccessfully attempted to put the company into receivership in 1923, and slow sales led the company into receivership in 1924. A year after it emerged from receivership in 1925, the company's leadership was discussing a merger with Du Pont Motors, once again indicating possible financial difficulties. Errett L. Cord, president of the Auburn Automobile Company, wanted a "supercar" to round out his two other automotive brands, Auburn and Cord, and proposed a financial rescue to acquire the Duesenberg company in 1926. The Duesenberg company became a subsidiary of the Cord Corporation. Fred Duesenberg served as vice president of engineering for the company, but Augie Duesenberg was responsible for running the separate Duesenberg Brothers racing business, established in August 1920. Augie Duesenberg was not involved in the development of Duesenberg luxury cars, which included models X, S, and J.

=== Racing team supervisor ===
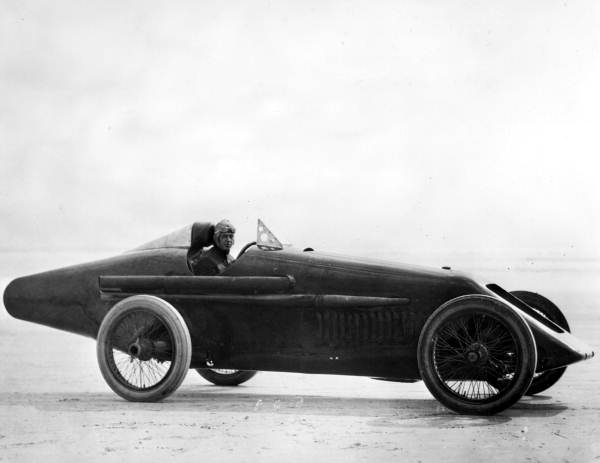
Tommy Milton in his race car at the Daytona Beach Road Course in 1920, courtesy of the Florida Photographic Collection

Augie Duesenberg supervised and directed the Duesenberg Brothers racing team from a shop across the street from the company's factory, while Fred focused on designing high-end passenger cars for Duesenberg, now a subsidiary of the Cord Corporation. However, the two brothers continued to work together in the development of their American-built racing car business. In April 1920 a Duesenberg racecar driven by Tommy Milton set a land speed record of 156.046 miles per hour (251.132 km/h) for a measured mile on the sands at Daytona Beach, Florida, although the attempt was not recognized as an official world record because Milton "had not made the required return run within the hour." In 1921 Jimmy Murphy drove a Duesenberg racer to become the first American car to win the prestigious Grand Prix at Le Mans, France. Augie traveled to France to present the team's credentials prior to the race and also witnessed the historic event.

Duesenberg racers continued to improve their performance and dominated the annual Indianapolis 500-mile races in the 1920s. In 1920 Tommy Milton and Jimmy Murphy won third and fourth places in Duesenberg racers in that year's Indianapolis 500. The field for the race in 1921 included eight Duesenberg-built racecars. The Duesenberg team car, driven by Roscoe Sarles, finished in second place. Duesenberg-built race cars took eight of the first ten places in Indianapolis 500-mile race in 1922, including the winning car, driven by Murphy, and the second-place finisher, driven by rookie Harry Hartz. The Indianapolis 500 in 1923 was a low point for the Duesenberg team. Wade Morton, the Duesenberg team driver, started twenty-fourth in the field, but finished in tenth place. Duesenberg-built racers won three out of the four Indianapolis 500-mile races between 1924 and 1927. Driver Lora L. Corum and relief driver Joe Boyer won the race in 1924; driver Pete DePaolo and relief driver Norman Batten won the race in 1925; and George Sanders won the race in 1927 in a Duesenberg-built car owned by Bill White. Driving a Duesenberg racer in 1925, DePaolo became the first Indianapolis 500-mile winner to average more than 100 miles per hour (160 km/h). In the 1926 race DePaulo finished in fifth place in a rain-shortened race, while the other Duesenberg team car, driven by rookie driver Ben Jones, experienced mechanical problems and crashed before the end of the race. The Duesenberg team continued to place in the top-ten in the 1928 and 1929 Indianapolis 500-mile races. In the 1928 race Fred Frame drove a Duesenberg racer to an eighth-place finish, while Jimmy Gleason drove a Duesenberg team car to a fifteenth-place finish. In the 1929 race the team's results improved with Gleason taking third and Freddie Winnai finishing in fifth place.

In 1930 the Duesenberg brothers split their racing operations with Augie naming his business A. S. Duesenberg Racing. The result was a total of eight Duesenberg-built racers entered in the Indianapolis 500 in 1930. The only Duesenberg racer to finish the race that year was driven by Bill Cummings, who took fifth place. Thirteen cars in the 1931 race were based on the Duesenberg Model A. Fred Frame drove Augie Duesenberg's ex-team car to a second-place finish, while Fred Duesenberg's two entries, driven by Jimmy Gleason and Ernie Triplett, finished sixth and seventh, respectively. Augie was also the designer and builder of a Duesenberg chassis for an entry in the 1931 race that was powered by a diesel engine from the Cummins Engine Company. Dave Evans, who became the first person to complete the race without making any pit stops, drove the car to a thirteenth-place finish. Duesenbergs faded from the top of the leaderboard beginning with the 1932 Indianapolis 500, when Duesenberg racers captured seventh-, eighth-, and ninth-place finishess with drivers Ira Hall, Freddie Winnai, and Billy Winn, respectively.

Although the Duesenberg Brothers racing business dissolved after Fred Duesenberg's death in an automobile accident in July 1932, Augie Duesenberg continued to build racecars on his own. Joe Russo drove the Duesenberg-built "Wonder Bread Special" to a seventeenth-place finish in the 1933 Indianapolis 500. Russo's Duesenberg-built racer for the 1934 Indianapolis 500, the last year that the Duesenbergs were major contenders, finished in fifth place. In addition to his racing car business, which continued into the 1930s, Augie Duesenberg built two marine racing engines for Horace D. Dodge in 1926. He also built mechanical lap-counting equipment for auto races.

Beginning in 1934 Augie Duesenberg built the first of three speed-setting racers with Ab Jenkins. Between August 6 and August 30, 1935, Jenkins set a 24-hour speed record of 135.47 miles per hour (218.02 km/h) in the "Mormon Meteor", a Duesenberg-based racer, on the Bonneville Salt Flats in Utah. Jenkins and the racer also set a one-hour speed record of 152.145 miles per hour (244.854 km/h).

== Later years ==
During the tough economic times of the Great Depression, Duesenberg began working in 1934 for E. L. Cord as a consultant to the Auburn Automobile Company at its factories in Auburn and Connersville, Indiana. With dwindling numbers of buyers for its luxury cars, Duesenberg auto production ended in 1937, and the Cord Company, near bankruptcy in 1937, was sold to Aviation Corporation.

In 1940, Augie Duesenberg and his nephew, Wesley Duesenberg, formed Duesenberg Model Company to manufacture miniature racecars. During World War II, Augie Duesenberg worked as a subcontractor for Indianapolis-area industries. After the war, he retired to a farm southwest of Indianapolis, near Camby in Decatur Township, Marion County, Indiana. Fritz Duesenberg, Augie's son, became involved in the Duesenberg auto business in the 1960s, when he attempted a revival of the Duesenberg marque (brand name), but he did not succeed. Marshall Merkes, who owned the rights to the Duesenberg marque, also tried to revive the Duesenberg automobile, but his efforts were unsuccessful as well.

== Death and legacy ==
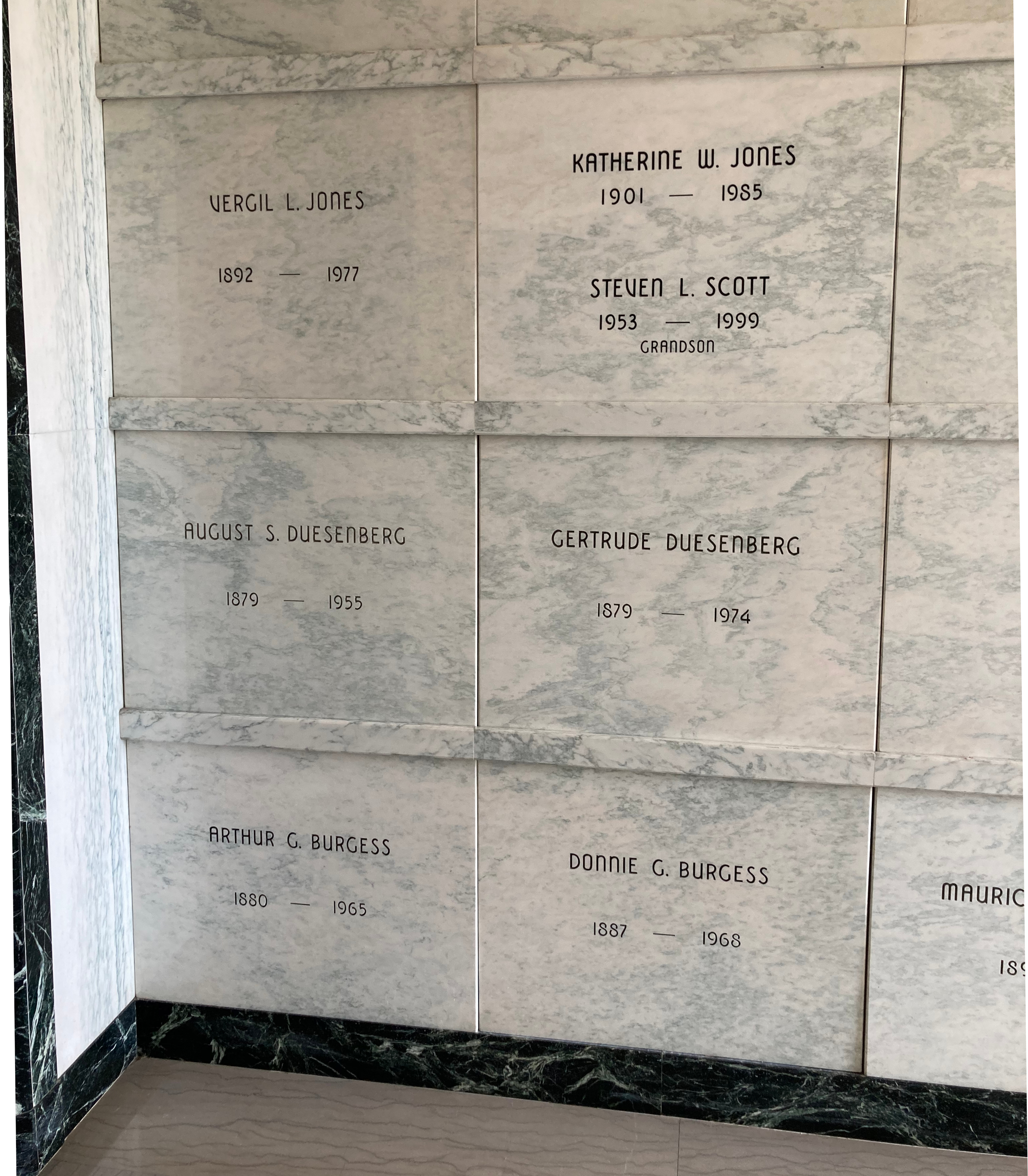
Duesenberg's grave at Crown Hill Cemetery

Duesenberg died of a heart attack at his rural home near Indianapolis on January 18, 1955, at the age of seventy-five. His remains are interred at Crown Hill Cemetery in Indianapolis.

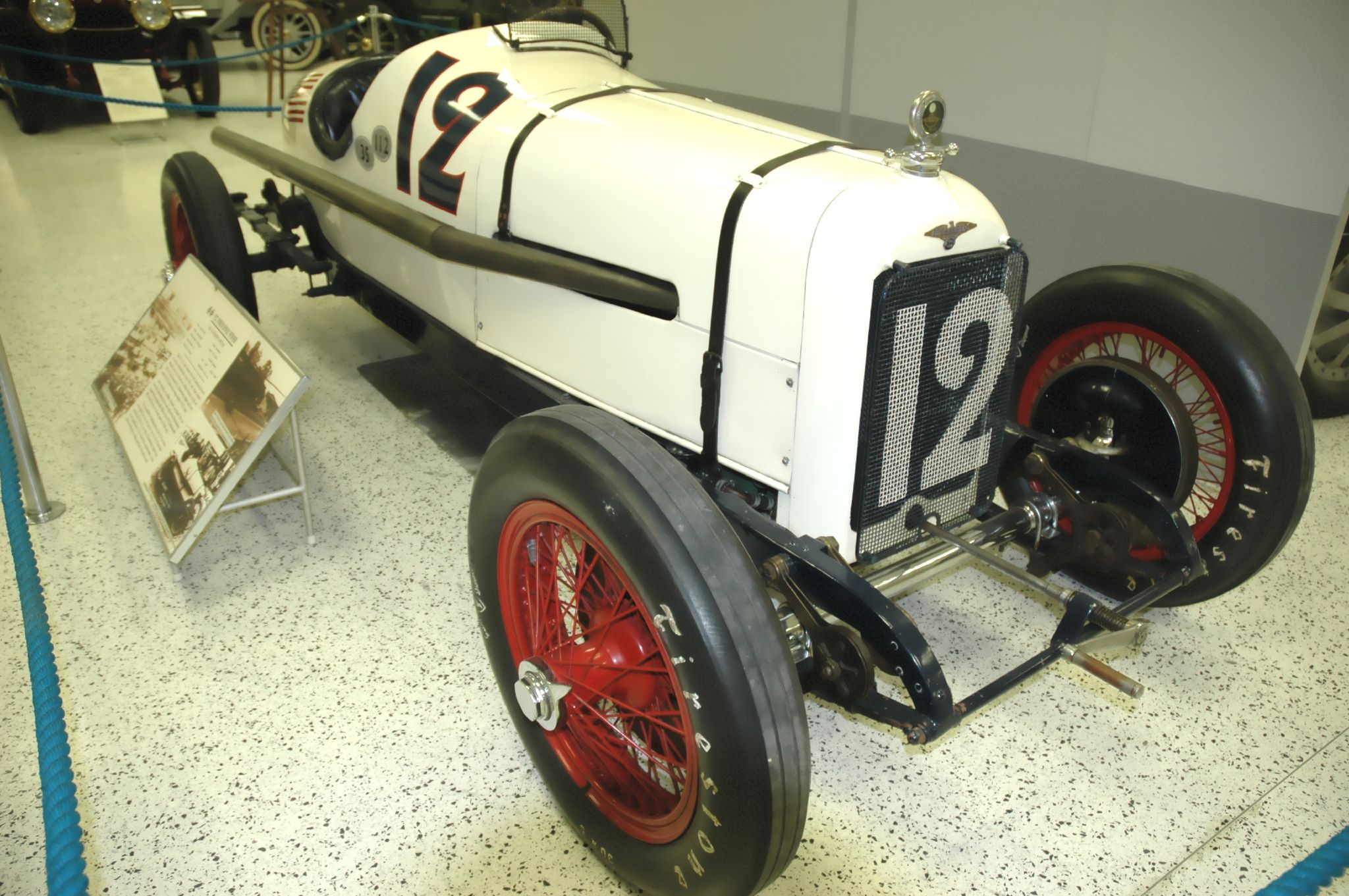
1922 Indianapolis 500 and 1921 French Grand Prix-winning racecar

Augie Duesenberg and his brother, Fred, were cofounders of the Duesenberg Motor Company in 1913, and the Duesenberg Automobiles and Motor Company in 1920; however, Augie was not involved in the Indianapolis-based automaker's production of luxury passenger cars. Instead, he focused on the Duesenberg Brothers racing business and hand-built American race cars. Duesenberg-built racers set speed records at Daytona Beach, Florida, in 1920, won the French Grand Prix in 1921, and won three Indianapolis 500-mile races (1924, 1925, and 1927), as well as setting one-hour and 24-hour speed records on the Bonneville Salt Flats in Utah in 1935.

== Honors and awards ==
- Inducted into the Auto Racing Hall of Fame (later renamed Indianapolis Motor Speedway Hall of Fame) in 1963.
- Inducted into the National Sprint Car Hall of Fame in 1990.
- Inducted into the Motorsports Hall of Fame of America in 2019.

== See also ==
- Duesenberg
- Duesenberg Model A
- Duesenberg Straight-8 engine
- Stutz Motor Company
