= Mason Motor Car Company =

Defunct United States motor vehicle manufacturer

Mason Motor Car Company Mason Motor Company
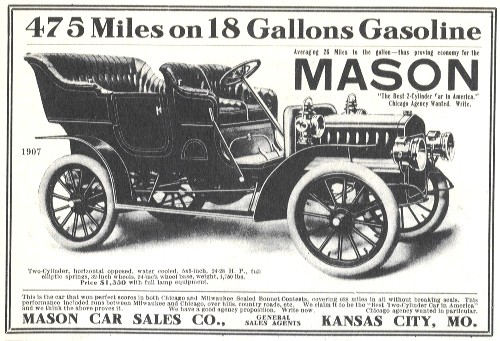
- 1907 Mason 24-hp Touring Car advertisement
- Industry: Automotive
- Founded: 1906; 120 years ago
- Founder: E. R. Mason, F. S. Duesenberg
- Defunct: 1914; 112 years ago
- Headquarters: Des Moines, Iowa and Waterloo, Iowa, United States
- Key people: Edward Mason, Fred Duesenberg, August Duesenberg
- Products: Automobiles
- Production output: 1,513 (1906–1914)

The Mason was a Brass Era automobile manufactured in Des Moines, Iowa from 1906 to 1909 and Waterloo, Iowa from 1911 to 1914. In 1909 and 1910 it was marketed as the Maytag-Mason.

== History ==
The first prototype called the Marvel was powered by a 24-hp flat-twin engine with a planetary transmission. The main feature of the car was the innovative overhead valve engine and water cooling with a pump. With a displacement of 3,277cc (200 ci), the engine delivered 24–28 hp. The engine was midships under the floor and it was designed by Fred S. Duesenberg assisted by his brother August Duesenberg who was a pattern-maker at the factory. The prototypes name was changed to Mason for attorney Edward R. Mason who was the largest shareholder. Edward Mason became the company president while Fred Duesenberg became the factory superintendent.

=== Mason Motor Car Company ===
Mason production began on August 16, 1906. Marketing efforts for the new car promoted its strength by having it drive up the 47 steps of the Iowa State Capitol building. Other advertisements boasted about the excellent fuel efficiency of the Duesenberg two-cylinder engine, claiming it could carry the car 475 miles on 18 gallons of gasoline. "The Fastest and Strongest Two-Cylinder Car in America" was the Mason's slogan. Beginning in 1907 the Mason was used in racing and reliability trials. The 1906 to 1908 Mason was made as a touring car or runabout and priced at $1,350, equivalent to $48,375 in 2025.

In 1908 the company was reorganized as the Mason Automobile Company and factory expansion plans were started.

=== Maytag-Mason ===
In 1909 the company was bought by washing machine maker Frederick L. Maytag and his son Elmer H. Maytag. The new company, Maytag-Mason Motor Company moved production to Waterloo, Iowa at the suggestion of William O. Galloway. The two-cylinder cars were continued as Masons, and a new four-cylinder car was marketed as a Maytag. For 1911 both cars were named Maytag, but late in the same year, the Maytag family pulled out of the company.

=== Mason Motor Company ===
The Duesenberg brothers left the company when the Maytags controlled it but retained the Mason name for racing cars they built. By 1913, they were in St. Paul, Minnesota where they established the Duesenberg Motor Company.

Edward Mason regained control of the company by 1912 from Galloway and Maytag interests and reorganized as Mason Motor Company. The Duesenbergs retained some ties with Edward Mason and in 1912 a new 2-cylinder Duesenberg engine of 20-hp was introduced. This is the first version of the famous Duesenberg" walking beam" engine. In 1913, the $3,000 (equivalent to $96,429 in 2025) Mason-Mohler was announced. This new car had a four-cylinder 65-hp Duesenberg engine mounted on a 128-inch wheelbase chassis that was underslung in the front and overslung at the rear. This may have been a de-tuned version of the four-cylinder "walking beam" engine.

Finances and leadership changes proved insurmountable for Edward Mason and the company was bankrupt by the end of 1914. The Waterloo factory was sold for $35,000 in 1915.

== Gallery ==
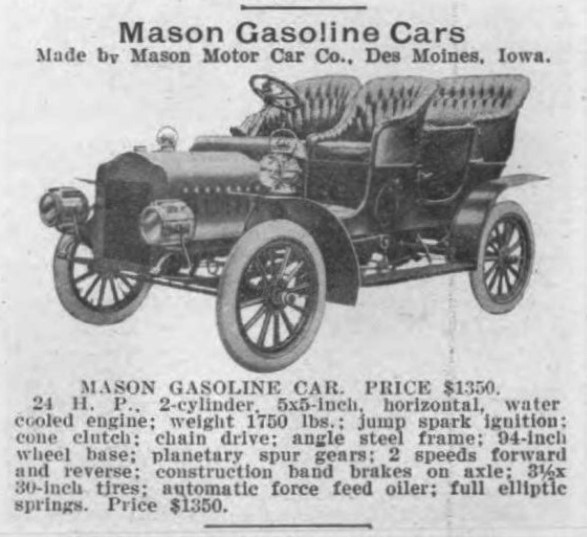
1907 Mason 24-hp Touring Car

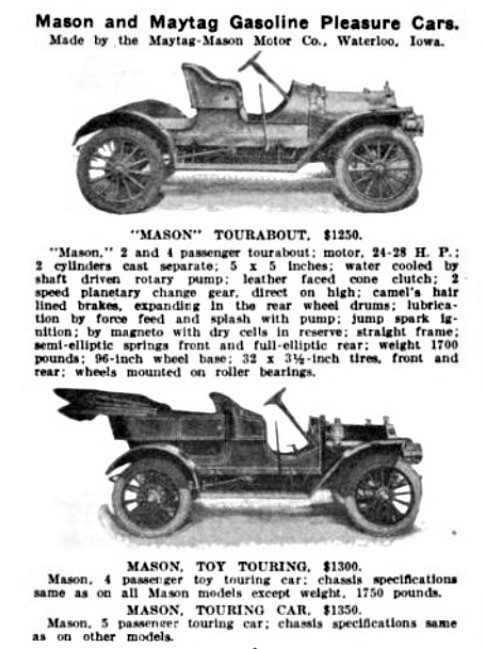
1910 24-hp Mason Tourabout and Toy Touring cars

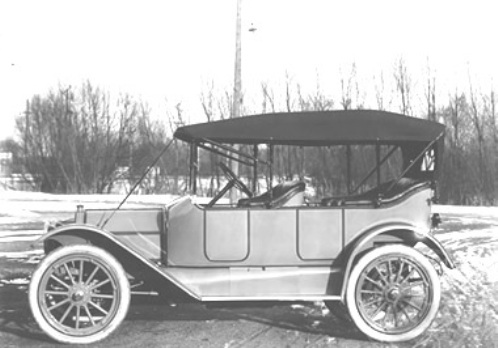
1912 Mason Model A 20-hp Touring Car

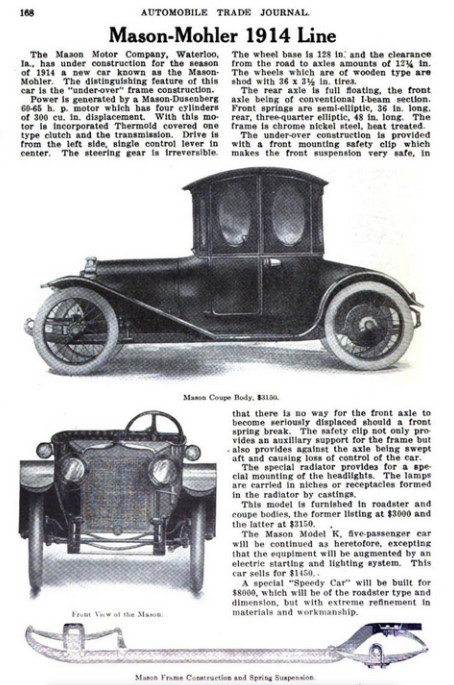
1914 65-hp Mason-Mohler - Automobile Trade Journal

== Model overview ==
Motor Cars

Year	Model	Cylinders	Displace- ment cc	Horse- power	Wheelbase mm	Body	Price US$
1906–1908	Mason 24-HP	2	3218	24	2286	Runabout, 2 seat Touring, 5 seat	1,285 1,350
1909	Mason 24-HP	2	3218	24	2438	Tourabout, 4 seats Touring, 5 seats	1,250 1,350
1910	Mason 24-HP	2	3218	24	2438	Tourabout, 2/4 seat Toy Touring, 4 seat Touring, 5 seat	1,250 1,250 1,350
1910	Maytag 32/35 HP	4	4599	32	2896	Touring, 5 seat	2,250
1911	Maytag 20-HP Model A Model B Model C	2	3218	24	2438	Runabout, 2 seat Toy Tonneau, 4 seat Touring, 5 seat	1,250 1,300 1,350
1911	Maytag 35-HP Model D Model E Model F Model G Model H	4	3218	35	2896	Touring Touring Touring Touring Boattail Roadster	1,750 1,750 1,750 1,750 1,650
1912	Mason 20-HP Model A Model B Model C	2	3218	24	2438	Touring Torpedo Roadster	1,050 1,050 1,050
1912	Mason 30-HP Model D Model E Model F Model G Model H	4	3218	35	2946	Roadster Touring Touring Touring Roadster	1,750 1,000 1,150 1,250 1,650
1912	Mason Knight	4				announced- not produced	
1913	Mason Model C	2	3218	24	2438	Touring, 5 seat	900
1913	Mason Model K	4	3218	35	2946	Fore-Door Touring, 5 seat	1,290
1914	Mason Model K	4	3218	35	2946	Touring, 5 seat	1,350
1914	Mason-Mohler 65-HP	4		65	3251	Roadster Coupe	3,000 3,150

== See also ==
- Mason Motor Cars at AutomotiveHistory.org
- Sothebys Auction −1906 Mason
