= Fred Duesenberg =

American automobile designer (1876–1932)

Frederick Samuel Duesenberg
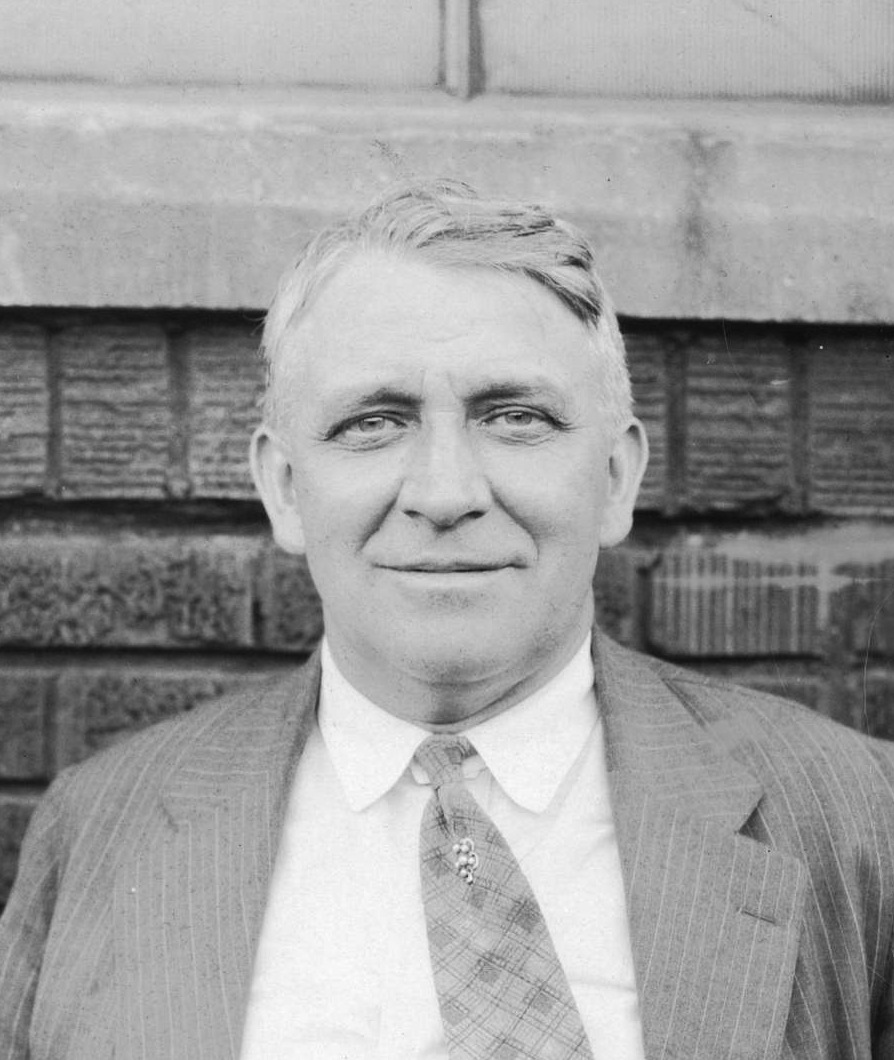
- Fred Duesenberg in 1925
- Born: Friedrich Simon Düsenberg; December 6, 1876; Lippe, Germany
- Died: July 26, 1932 (aged 55); Johnstown, Pennsylvania, U.S.
- Resting place: Crown Hill Cemetery and Arboretum, Section 104, Lot 294; 39.8187324°N 86.1680906°W
- Occupations: Early automobile designer; manufacturer; racer
- Known for: Duesenberg automobile
- Awards: Motorsports Hall of Fame

Frederick Samuel Duesenberg (December 6, 1876 – July 26, 1932) was a German-born American automobile and engine designer, manufacturer and sportsman who was internationally known as a designer of racecars and racing engines. Duesenberg's engineering expertise influenced the development of the automobile, especially during the 1910s and 1920s. He is credited with introducing an eight-cylinder engine, also known as the Duesenberg Straight-8 engine, and four-wheel hydraulic brakes, a first for American cars, in addition to other mechanical innovations. Duesenberg was also patentholder of his designs for a four-wheel hydraulic brake, an early automatic transmission, and a cooling system, among others. Fred and his younger brother, August "Augie" Duesenberg, shared the patents, filed in 1913 and renewed in 1918, for their "walking beam" four-cylinder engine and the Duesenberg Straight 8 (an eight-cylinder engine with a single, overhead camshaft).

In 1913 the Duesenberg brothers founded the Duesenberg Motor Company, Incorporated, which was subsequently sold, and in 1920 were among the founders of the Duesenberg Automobile and Motor Company, which manufactured passenger cars in Indianapolis, Indiana, from 1921 until 1937, including the Duesenberg Model A, the brothers' first mass-produced vehicle. Fred Duesenberg served as the chief engineer at both companies. From 1926 until his death in 1932, Fred Duesenberg focused on designs for luxury passenger cars, which included the Duesenberg models X, S, and J, while serving as vice president of engineering and later in the 1920s as president of the company. Duesenberg died from complications following a car accident in 1932; Duesenberg passenger-car production ended five years later.

In addition to designing passenger cars, Fred and Augie Duesenberg were involved in auto racing for more than a decade. Although Fred was no longer driving racecars by 1912, he remained active for another twelve years as a racecar designer and team owner. In April 1920 a Duesenberg racecar driven by Tommy Milton set a land-speed record of 156.046 miles per hour (251.132 km/h) for a measured mile on the sands at Daytona Beach, Florida. In 1921 Jimmy Murphy drove a Duesenberg racer to become the first American car to win the prestigious Grand Prix at Le Mans, France. Duesenberg-made entries also participated in Indianapolis 500-mile auto races between 1912 and 1932, including winning the annual event at the Indianapolis Motor Speedway in 1924, 1925, and 1927 before Fred Duesenberg retired from racing in 1931.

== Early life and education ==
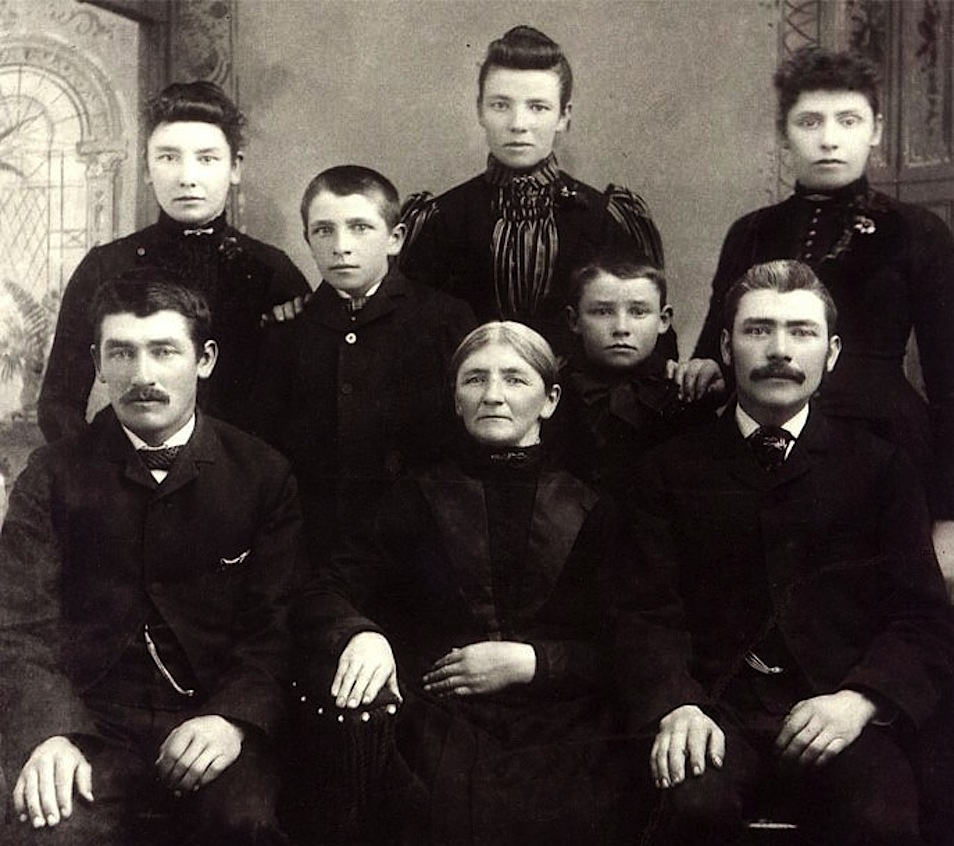
Duesenberg Family (Fred, second row, left; August, second row, right)

Friedrich "Fred" S. Düsenberg (or Frederick "Fred" Duesenberg as his name was spelled after his arrival in the United States) was born on December 6, 1876, in Lippe, Lippe-Detmold, Germany, to Konrad (Conrad) and Luise Düsenberg. Fred and his younger brother, August "Augie" Samuel Düsenberg, were the youngest of the family's seven children (four boys and three girls). Fred's father died in 1881, and his older brother, Henry, immigrated to America in 1884. Fred's mother sold the family farm in Germany and immigrated to the United States in 1885 and joined Henry in Iowa with her other children, including Fred, who was nearly nine years old. The eldest son, Conrad, purchased a 200-acre (81-hectare) farm in Floyd County, Iowa, near Rockford, where the family finally settled.

Duesenberg developed mechanical abilities from an early age. He attended public schools through the eighth grade and completed at least one correspondence course in mechanical drafting. He received no additional classroom training. Most of his engineering and automotive skills were acquired though apprenticeships and other hands-on work experience, including early work repairing farm machinery and windmills near the family home in Rockford, Iowa. During his early years, Duesenberg also took up bicycle racing.

Sources disagree on whether Fred Duesenberg's middle name was Simon or Samuel; however, Samuel is consistently given as the middle name of his younger brother, Augie.

== Marriage and family ==
Fred married Isle "Mickey" Denney of Runnells, Iowa, on April 27, 1913. Their son, Denny, became involved in auto racing after Fred retired from the sport in 1931.

== Career ==
=== Entrance into engineering industry ===
Fred and his brother, August "Augie" Duesenberg, began building and racing bicycles in Iowa in the 1890s. They also began experimenting with gasoline-powered, internal combustion engines. The brothers designed one of their own engines around 1900, as well as building motorcycles. After working at a garage in Des Moines, Iowa, Fred and Augie had a bicycle repair shop in Rockford, but the business went bankrupt in 1903. A short time later the brothers established another shop in Garner, Iowa, but Fred left the business in 1903 to work for the Thomas B. Jeffery Company, a manufacturer of the Rambler bicycles and early automobiles in Kenosha, Wisconsin. Fred returned to Iowa a year later to work as a machinist in a Des Moines auto supply company before opening a garage with Cheney Prouty and working as a sales agent for Rambler.

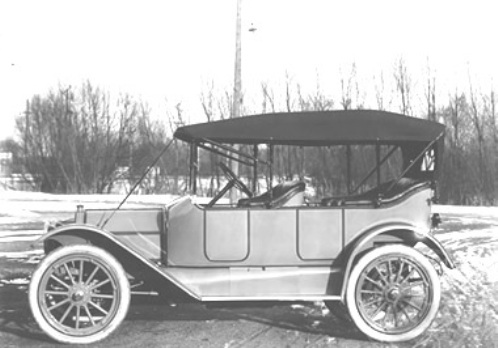
Fred developed the two-cylinder “walking beam” engine for the Mason 20 HP, Model A touring car

Through his repair business in Des Moines, Fred met Edward Mason, a local lawyer who became a financial backer of Fred's design for a two-cylinder car. The Mason Motor Car Company, incorporated in April 1906, began manufacturing cars four months later. Fred worked as a superintendent and designer at the company; Augie was a patternmaker. After U.S. Senator Fred Maytag, the future Maytag washing machine and appliance magnate, acquired a majority interest in the company, it reorganized in 1909 as the Maytag-Mason Motor Company and manufactured cars in Waterloo, Iowa. In addition to producing a two-cylinder model, the company introduced Fred's patented four-cylinder engine design. The simple, high-performance engine was also reliable. Duesenberg often demonstrated the power of his cars in public settings. For example, he drove a car up the steps of the Iowa State Capitol. He also learned from his early days as a bicycle racer that racing also helped increase product sales, so the Duesenberg brothers began entering their cars in races.

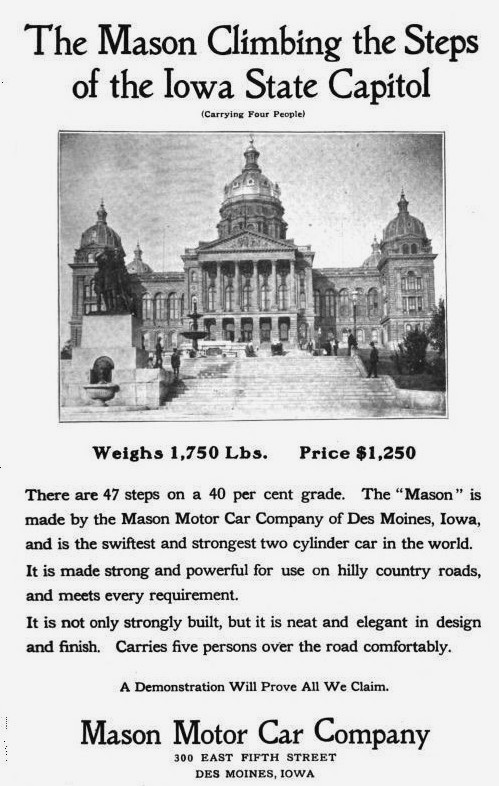
A Mason automobile being driven up the steps of the Iowa State Capitol

Maytag and Mason proved to be inexperienced in the car-making business and the company gradually folded. Fred left the company in 1910 to focus on racing and engine designs in his shop in Des Moines. The Maytag-Mason partnership was dissolved in 1912 and its auto production ended the following year. Around 1910 Fred and Augie Duesenberg began work on their "walking beam" four-cylinder automobile and racing engine, which was later replaced by the Duesenberg straight-eight engine. The brothers shared the patents for both engines, which were filed in 1913 and renewed in 1918. In 1913, the Duesenbergs relocated to Saint Paul, Minnesota, where they continued to develop racing cars and automobile and marine engines. The two brothers contracted with Commodore James A. Pugh of Chicago, Illinois, to build a racing-boat engine and used the proceeds from the contract to further develop their racing business. In June 1913 the brothers also founded the Duesenberg Motor Company, Incorporated.

=== Early auto races ===
The Duesenberg brothers' prior experience in racing bicycles and motorcycles, led to their participation in auto races. Fred won his first car race at the Iowa State Fair in Mason City. In 1907 he drove his test car through a fence, suffering a broken shoulder, and by 1912 he was no longer driving race cars, although he remained active for another twelve years a racecar designer and team owner.

As other automobile builders in the early twentieth century did, the Duesenbergs used the Indianapolis Motor Speedway to test and race their cars. Fred Duesenberg's entries participated in Indianapolis 500-mile auto races between 1912 and his death in 1932. The first Duesenberg appearance at the Indianapolis 500 occurred in 1912, when their Mason Motor Company-owned racecar practiced for the race, but it had a mechanical failure and did not compete. Between 1913 and 1916 the Duesenberg racing team improved its standings in the annual Indianapolis 500. The team took ninth place in the race in 1913. In 1914, Eddie Rickenbacker, a future World War I aviation ace, drove a Duesenberg-powered racecar to a tenth-place finish and US$1,400 in prize money. The team also had a twelfth-place finisher that year. In 1915 the team had another good showing, taking fifth and seventh places. In 1916 it had its best finish to date when rookie driver Wilbur D'Alene finished in second place. With the outbreak of World War I, efforts focused on wartime production and racing at the Indianapolis Motor Speedway went on a two-year hiatus.

=== World War I-era engine designer ===
In 1917, the Duesenberg Motor Company of Saint Paul, Minnesota, and the Loew-Victor Manufacturing Company of Chicago, Illinois, merged into the Duesenberg Motor Corporation. Fred Duesenberg served as the company's chief engineer, with his brother, Augie, as assistant engineer. The Loew-Victor Company also made an agreement to have the Duesenbergs produce automobile and airplane engines for military use for the American, British, Italian, and Russian governments during World War I. The Duesenberg brothers moved to New York City in 1917 to supervise operations at a new manufacturing site in Elizabeth, New Jersey, that was constructed especially for building aviation and marine engines. The Duesenberg brothers' experience working with Ettore Bugatti's airplane engines led to changes in their own engineering ideas. The Bugatti engine served as a catalyst for refinements to the design of the Duesenberg Straight-8 engine, an eight-cylinder engine with a single, overhead camshaft.

The Duesenberg brothers left Elizabeth, New Jersey, at the end of the war to concentrate on the development of racecars from a rented space in Newark, New Jersey. In 1919, after the Duesenberg Motor Corporation was sold to John Willys, the Duesenberg brothers finished their work at the company's Minnesota and New Jersey factories and then concentrated on their racing business. In 1920 the Duesenberg brothers moved to Indianapolis, Indiana, where the newly formed Duesenberg Automobile and Motors Company planned to manufacture passenger cars.

=== 1920s luxury-car designer ===
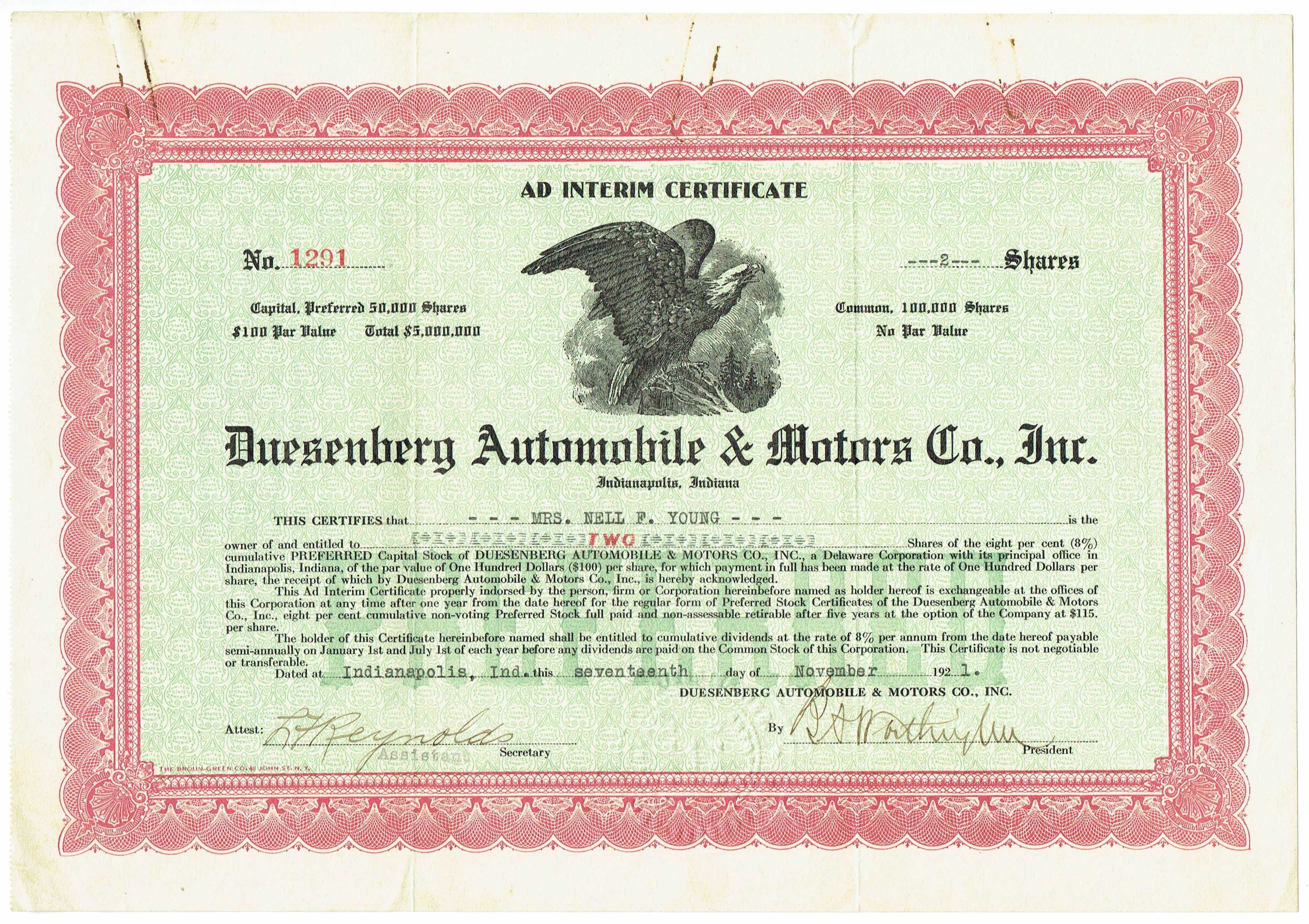
An interim share certificate of the Duesenberg Automobile & Motors Co., issued November 17, 1921

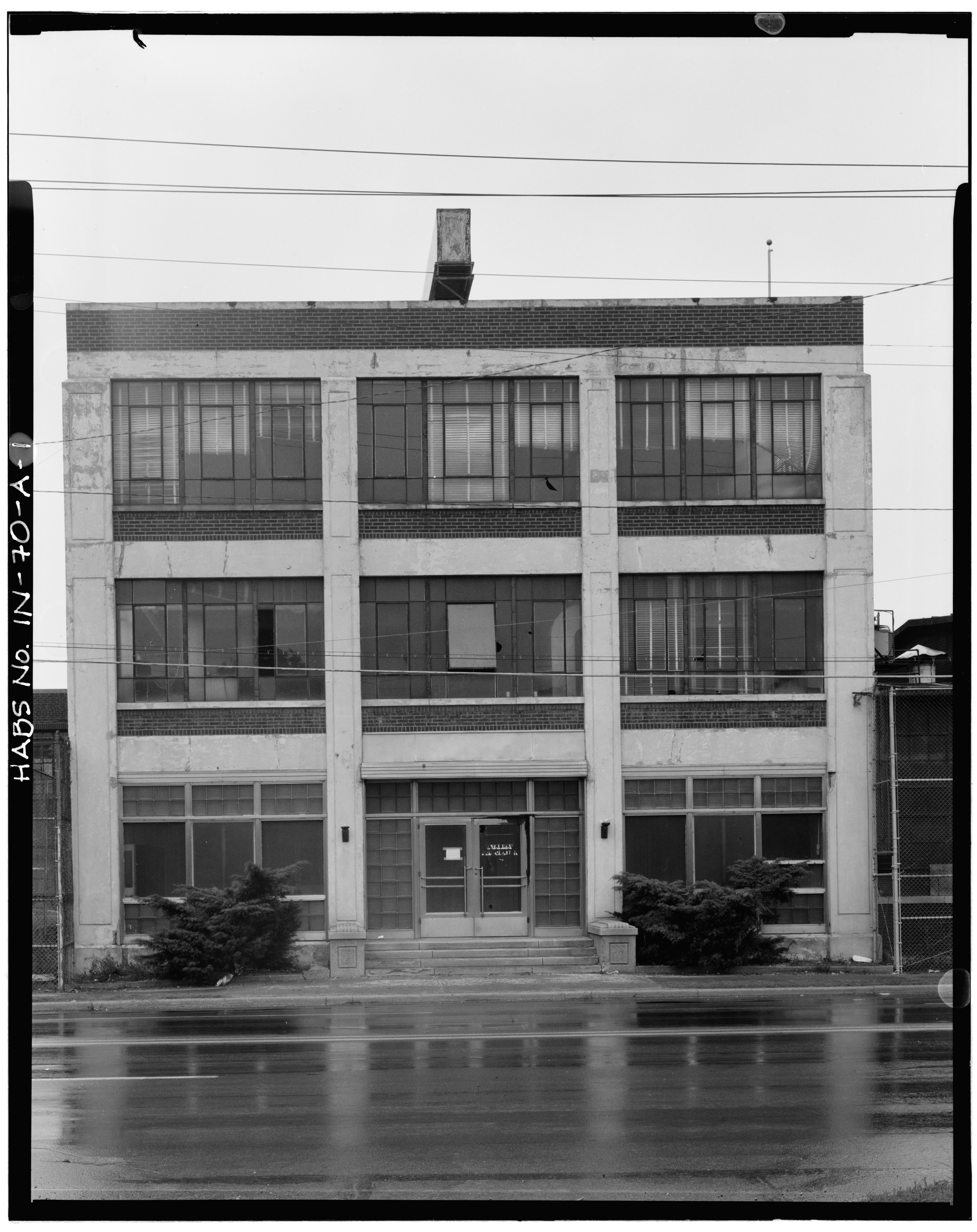
Duesenberg Automobile Company Factory building No. 1, 1501 West Washington Street, Indianapolis, Indiana

While continuing to develop racing engines, the Duesenberg brothers and their financial backers, Newton E. Van Zandt and Luther M. Rankin, established the Duesenberg Automobile & Motors Company in March 1920 with its headquarters in Indianapolis. Fred was the chief engineer and later in the 1920s served as president of the company; his brother, Augie, was an assistant engineer. Beginning in May 1921 the Duesenberg company manufactured passenger cars with advanced racing-car features at its new factory in Indianapolis at the corner of Washington and Harding Streets. The facility was also close to the Indianapolis Motor Speedway, which was used as a test track.

The first passenger car to bear the Duesenberg family surname was introduced in New York in late 1920. The new car featured an "inline eight-cylinder overhead cam engine and four-wheel hydraulic brakes," a first for American cars. The Duesenberg Model A, their company's first mass-produced vehicle, was manufactured between 1921 and 1927. The Model A proved to be unpopular with car buyers because of its high cost (US$8,500 for the chassis alone) and unstylish exterior. As a result, the company struggled financially.

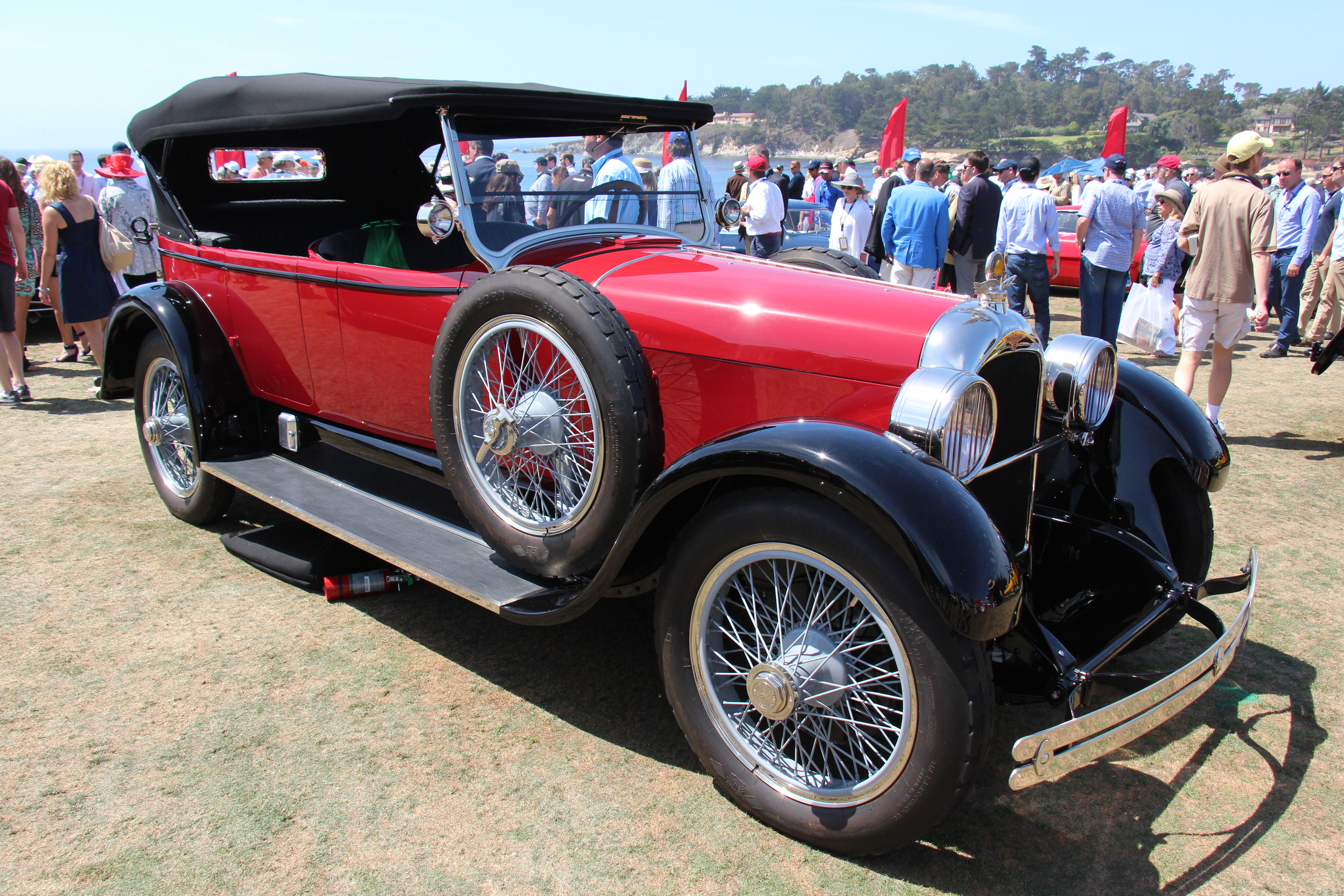
Duesenberg Model A Tourer

A minor shareholder unsuccessfully attempted to put the company into receivership in 1923 and slow sales led the company into receivership in 1924, but it emerged in 1925. A year later the company's leadership was discussing a merger with Du Pont Motors, once again indicating possible financial concerns. E. L. Cord, president of the Auburn Automobile Company, admired the Duesenberg Model A and proposed a financial rescue to acquire the Duesenberg company. Cord wanted to manufacture a faster and more prestigious "supercar" to round out the offerings of his other automotive brands, the Auburn and Cord. E. L. Cord's acquisition of the Duesenberg company in 1926 also included Fred, who was tasked with designing faster and more powerful luxury cars than the Duesenberg competitors. From 1926 until his death in 1932, Fred focused on designs for passenger cars, which included the X, S, and J models, and served as vice president of engineering at Duesenberg, a subsidiary of the Cord Corporation. While Fred concentrated on passenger-car designs for E. L. Cord, his brother, Augie, ran the Duesenberg Brothers racing business.

In October 1926, E. L. Cord told the Indianapolis Star, "The purchase of the Duesenberg factory is the culmination of my plans to be able to offer the world an automobile of undisputed rank. In fact, the finest thing on four wheels. Duesenberg cars will be strictly custom-built, the owners selecting their own body styles, their own body makers and selecting their own colors. The price probably will be $18,000, no matter what model, from racer to limousine. We will give the buyer 120 mile-an-hour [190 km/h] speed if desired. Naturally, the production of this type of automobile, which carries a warranty of fifteen years, will be limited and we are now taking orders...." Early in 1927 the test board of the American Automobile Association presented to Fred Duesenberg with a bronze tablet in recognition of the leading part he had played in the development of several fundamental improvements in automotive engineering.

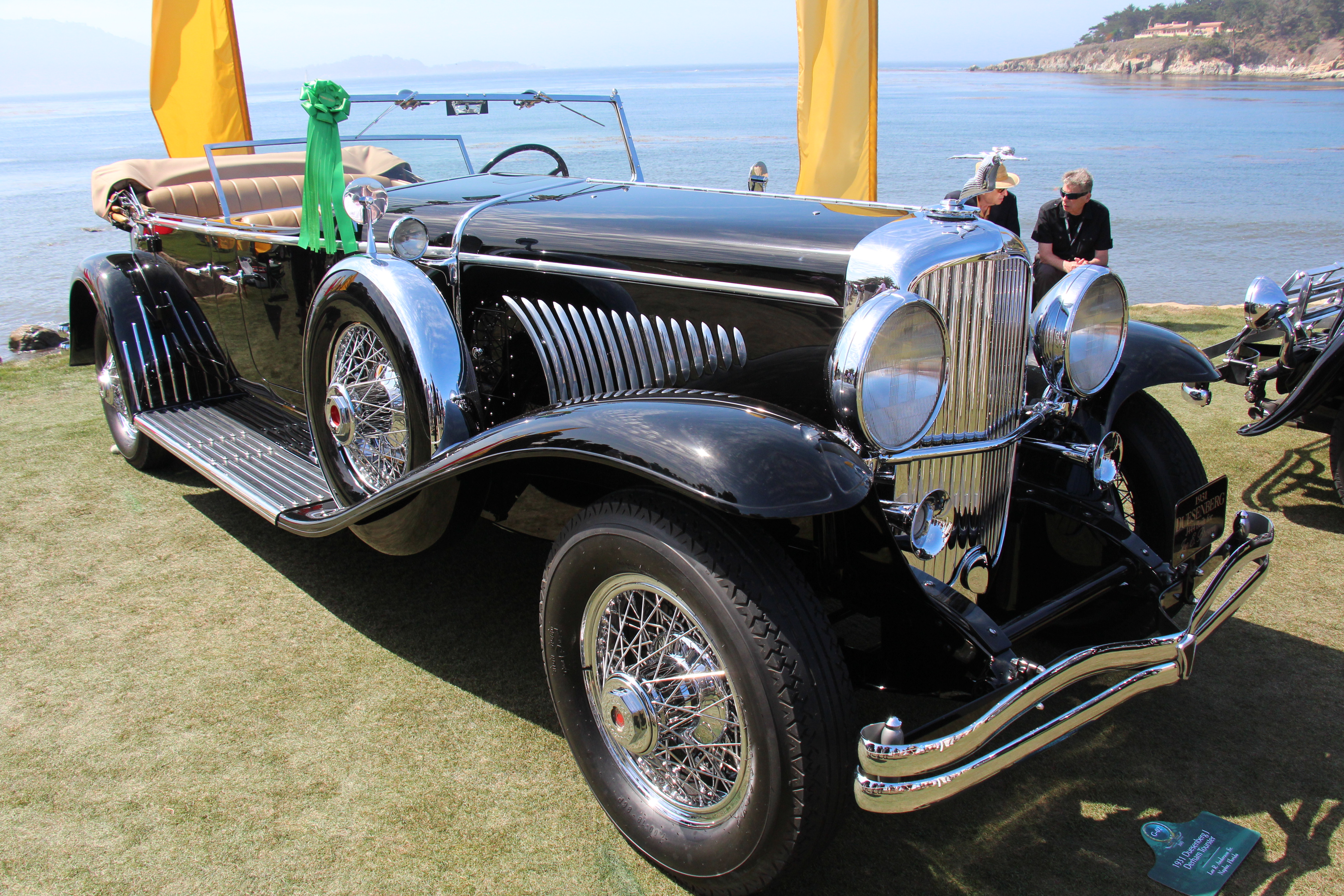
Duesenberg Model J Derham Tourster

The Duesenberg Model J, announced in late 1928, was the new luxury car that E. L. Cord wanted. Production began in the spring of 1929. Cord insisted that the Model J be bigger (and heavier) than Fred would have liked, but Duesenberg engineered the car's design. With prices for a completed car beginning at US$13,500, and later increased to US$18,000 or more, buyers received a luxury car with a 32-valve, dual overhead camshaft engine that was capable of generating 265 horsepower and could reach a maximum speed of 115 miles per hour (185 km/h).

In June 1931, during a Society of Automotive Engineers meeting in West Virginia, Duesenberg "predicted that speeds of 100 miles per hour (160 km/h) on the highways would soon be common." As of May 2019, speed limits for passenger cars on U.S. interstate highways remain under 100 mph (160 km/h), ranging from 55 mph (89 km/h) to 85 mph (137 km/h), depending on the individual state and road segment.

=== Later auto racing ===
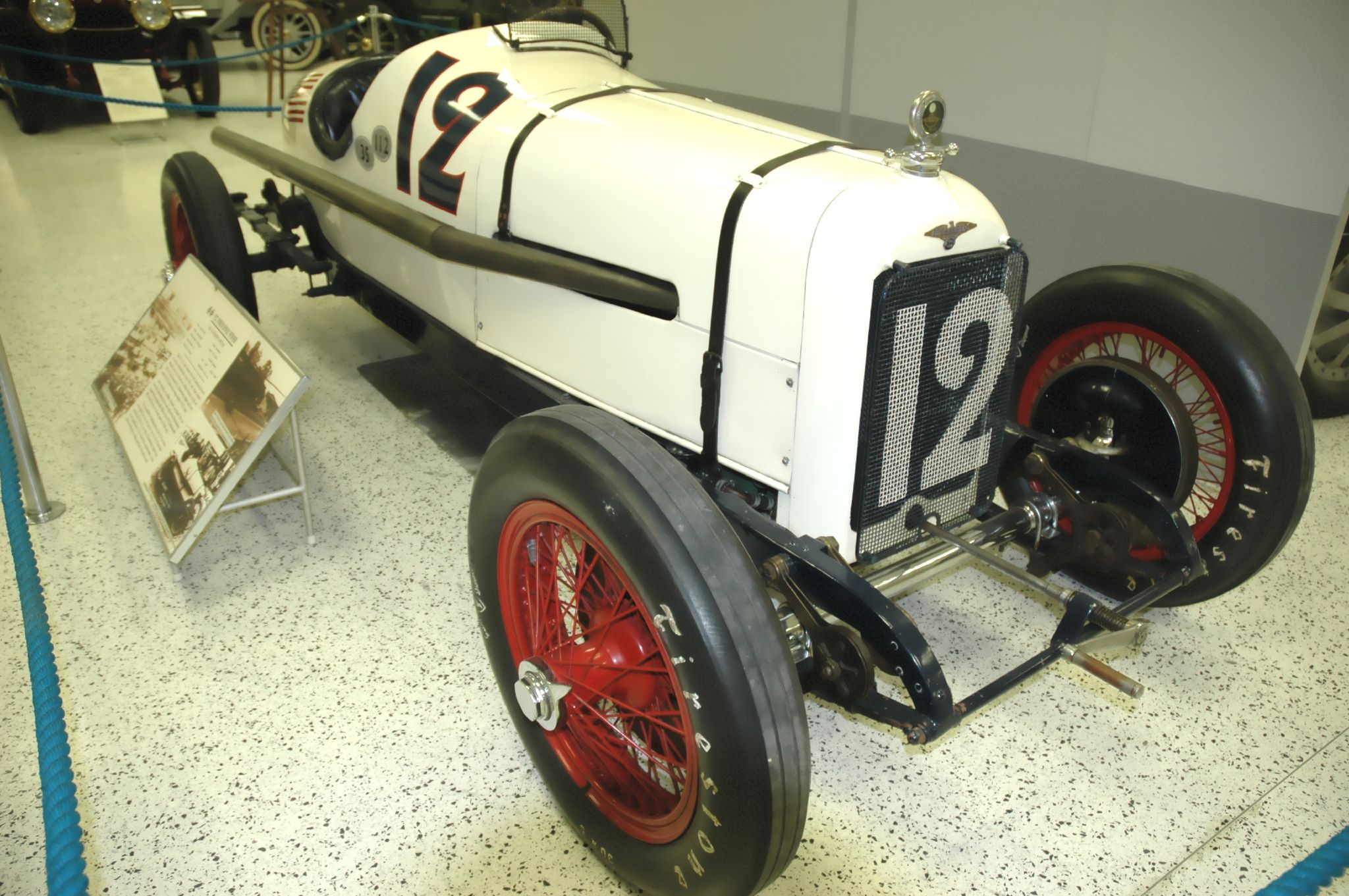
1922 Indianapolis 500 and 1921 French Grand Prix winning car

Although the Duesenberg team had mechanical and fuel issues in the Indianapolis 500-mile race in 1919 and its entries did not finish that year, the team continued to race with better success in the 1920s. Several Duesenberg-designed racers also set speed records before Fred officially retired from auto racing after the Indianapolis 500-mile race in 1931. In April 1920 a Duesenberg racecar driven by Tommy Milton set a land-speed record of 156.046 miles per hour (251.132 km/h) for a measured mile on the sands at Daytona Beach, Florida. In August 1920 Fred and Augie Duesenberg formed Duesenberg Brothers, a separate company for their auto-racing business. In 1921, Jimmy Murphy drove a Duesenberg racecar to become the first American car to win the prestigious Grand Prix at Le Mans, France.

Fred Duesenberg also designed the Duesenberg engines for race cars that won the three Indianapolis 500-mile races: the 1924 race with driver Lora L. Corum and relief driver Joe Boyer; the 1925 race with driver Pete DePaolo and relief driver Norman Batten; and the 1927 race with George Sanders in a Duesenberg-built car owned by Bill White. In 1925 a Duesenberg racecar with Pete DePaolo as driver became the first Indianapolis 500-mile winner to average more than 100 miles per hour (160 km/h). In 1926 the DePaulo finished in fifth place in the rain-shortened race, while the other Duesenberg team car driven by rookie driver Ben Jones experienced mechanical problems and crashed before the end of the race. The Duesenberg team continued to place in the top ten in the 1928 and 1929 Indianapolis 500-mile races. In the 1928 race Fred Frame drove a Duesenberg racer to an eighth-place finish, while Jimmy Gleason drove a Duesenberg team car to a fifteenth-place finish. In the 1929 race the team's results improved with Gleason taking third and Freddie Winnai finishing fifth.

In 1930 Fred Duesenberg cosponsored a racecar with DePaolo, one of two DePaolo-owned cars in the race. The Duesenberg racecar driven by DePaolo was involved in an accident and completed only twenty laps, finishing thirty-third in a field of thirty-eight drivers. The other racecar, driven by Bill Cummings, finished fifth. In 1931, the year that Fred Duesenberg retired from auto racing, thirteen cars in the Indianapolis 500-mile race were based on the Duesenberg Model A.

== Death and legacy ==
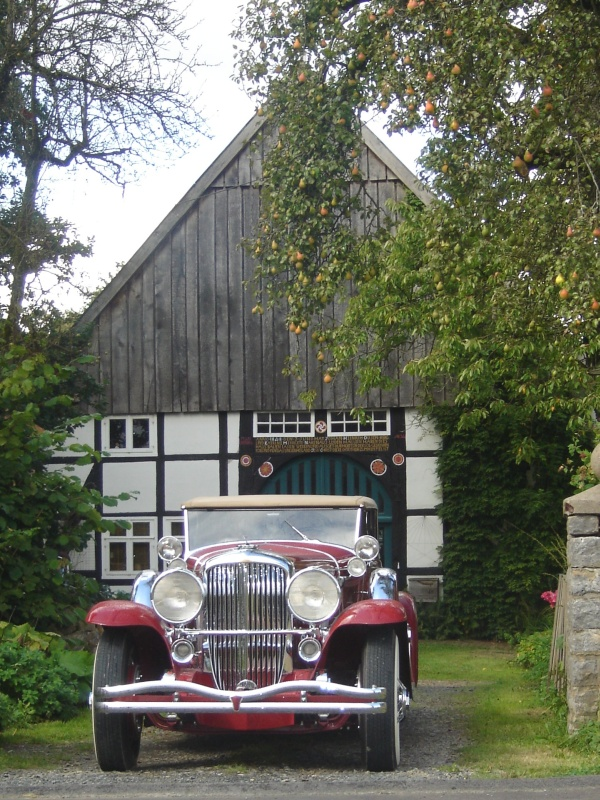
Duesenberg Model J Murphy convertible coupe in front of the Duesenberg home in Kirchheide, Germany

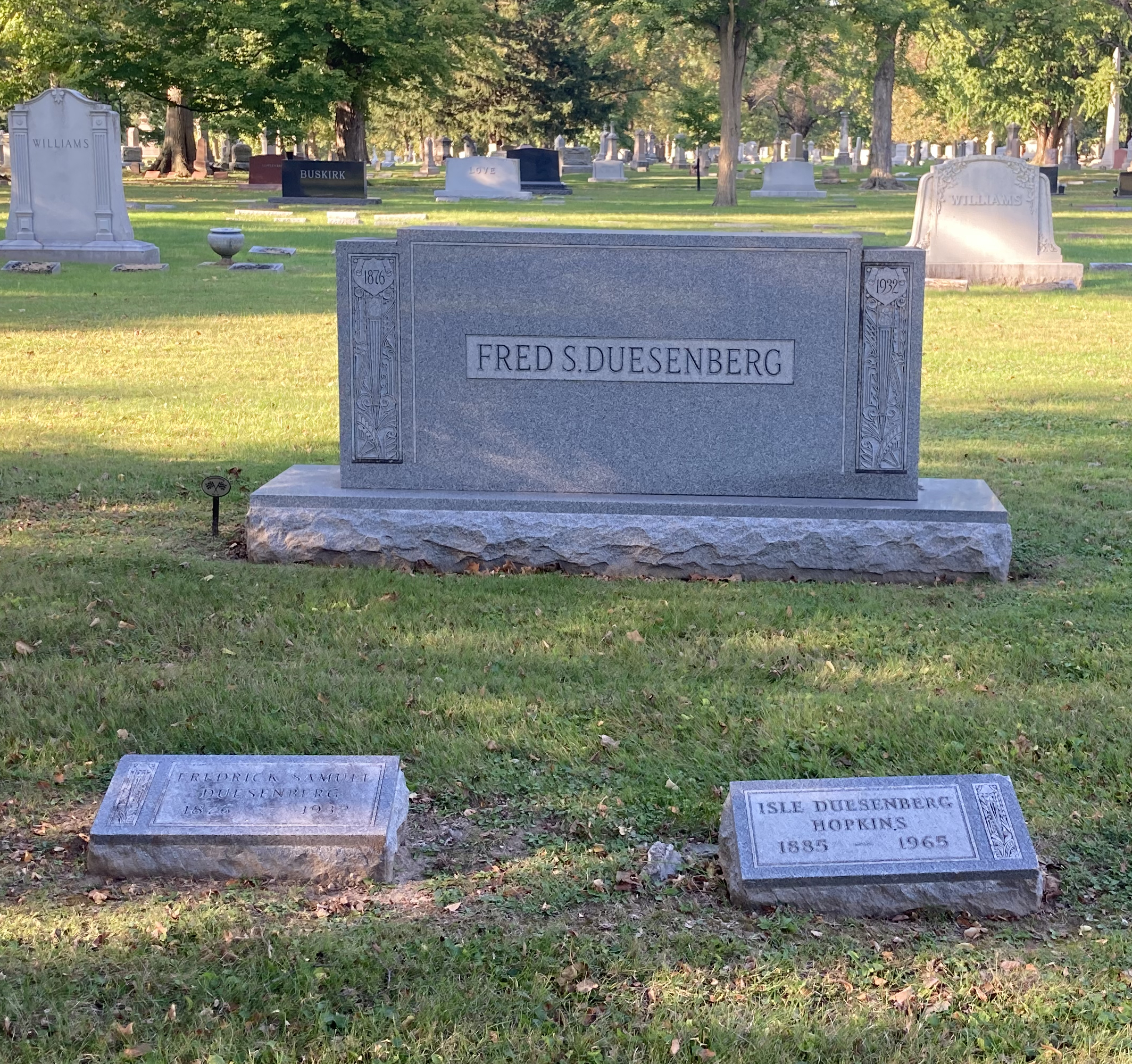
Duesenberg's grave at Crown Hill Cemetery

On July 2, 1932, while returning to Indianapolis from New York, Fred was driving a Duesenberg passenger car with a prototype, high-powered engine and lost control of it on a wet Lincoln Highway on Ligonier Mountain, about two miles west of Jennerstown, Pennsylvania. Duesenberg's automobile overturned, throwing him from the car. He was expected to fully recover from his injuries (a spinal injury and dislocation of the shoulder). While his wife and son traveled to Pennsylvania to be with him, Duesenberg developed pleural pneumonia. Duesenberg improved after oxygen was administered; however, he suffered a relapse and died on July 26, 1932, at the age of fifty-five. Duesenberg is buried at Crown Hill Cemetery in Indianapolis, Indiana.

Sales of Duesenberg automobiles declined during the Great Depression due to dwindling numbers of buyers for luxury cars. The last Model J car was produced in 1937, five years after Fred Duesenberg's death. Only 481 of the cars had been built by the time the Duesenberg company ceased production. Fred's brother and business partner, August Duesenberg, continued in the automobile business as a consultant to the Auburn Automobile Company and developing racecars with Ab Jenkins. Augie Duesenberg died on January 18, 1955, at the age of seventy-six.

Although Fred Duesenberg was a self-made man who lacked formal technical training, his engineering expertise influenced the development of the automobile. He is credited with introducing the eight-cylinder car in the United States and four-wheel brakes, in addition to other mechanical innovations that included overhead camshafts and four valves per cylinder. He was also patentholder of his designs for a four-wheel hydraulic brake, an early automatic transmission, and a cooling system, among others. The Auburn Cord Duesenberg Automobile Museum, which opened in 1974 in the former headquarters building of the Auburn Automobile Company in Auburn, Indiana, includes examples of Duesenberg-designed cars.

In addition designing passenger cars, Duesenberg was internationally known as a designer of racecars and racing engines. Many of his mechanical advancements in racing were later incorporated in mass-produced passenger cars. Although his innovations were found in Indianapolis-manufactured cars, including Stutz and Duesenberg models, they did not appear on autos made in Detroit until nearly seventy years later.

== Memberships ==
- Member, National Automobile Chamber of Commerce
- Member, Society of Automotive Engineers, and served on several of its committees.
- Indianapolis Athletic Club
- Indianapolis Optimist Club

== Awards ==
- Recipient of a bronze plaque from American Automobile Association's test board in 1927 for his contributions to automotive engineering.
- Inducted into the Auto Racing Hall of Fame (later renamed Indianapolis Motor Speedway Hall of Fame Museum) in 1962.
- Inducted into the National Sprint Car Hall of Fame in its inaugural class in 1990.
- Inducted into the Motorsports Hall of Fame of America in 1997.

== See also ==
- Auburn Automobile
- Auburn Cord Duesenberg Automobile Museum
- Cord Automobile
- Duesenberg
- Duesenberg Model A
- Duesenberg Model J
- Duesenberg Straight-8 engine
