= Duesenberg 16-valve straight-4 aero engine =

Aircraft engine

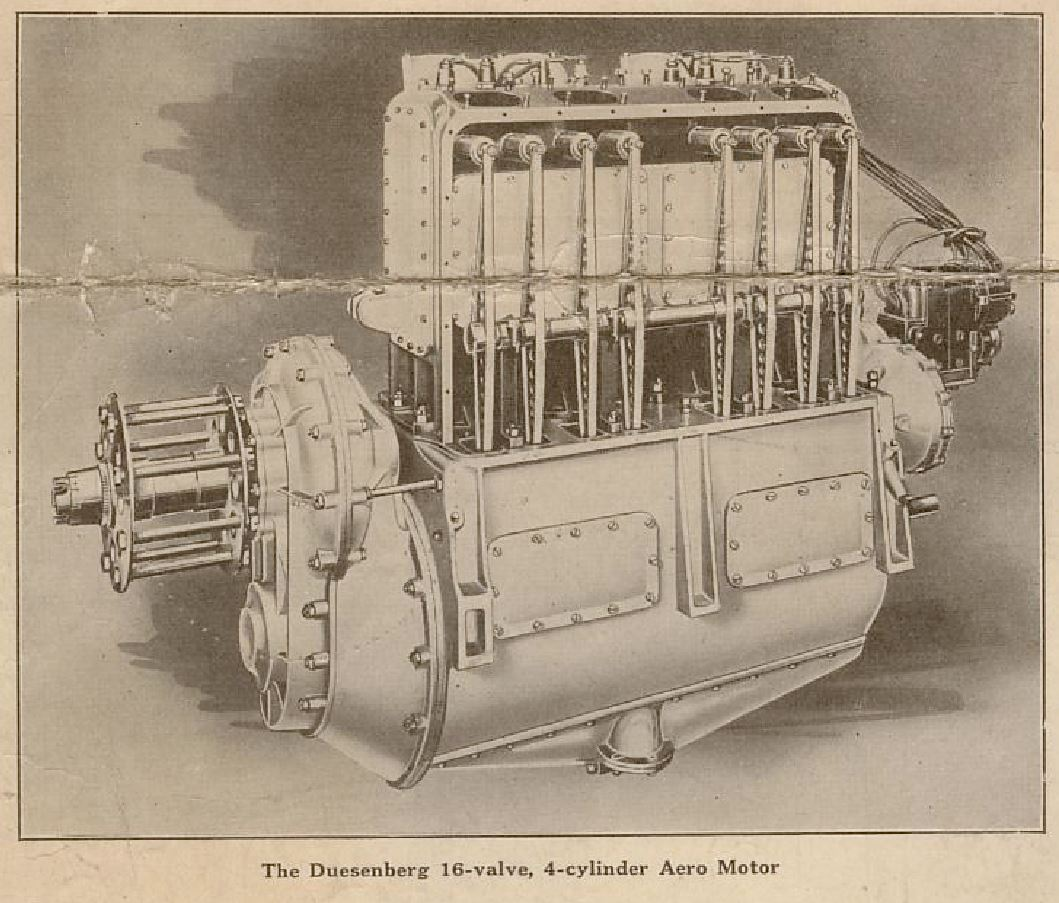
- 1917 newspaper advertisement for the aero engine
- Type: Water-cooled, straight-4 piston engine
- National origin: United States
- Manufacturer: Duesenberg
- Designer: Fred Duesenberg
- First run: 1916
- Developed from: Duesenberg 16-valve straight-4 racing engine

The Duesenberg 16-valve straight-4 aero engine was based on the company's earlier engine of a similar configuration used for automotive racing. Completed in 1916, the first two engines were delivered to the Gallaudet Aircraft Company for use in their D-1 maritime patrol aircraft later that year.

Data from Duesenberg Aircraft Engines: A Technical Description

=== General characteristics ===
- Type: Liquid-cooled, straight-4 piston engine
- Bore: 4.75 in (121 mm)
- Stroke: 7 in (178 mm)
- Displacement: 496 cu in (8,130 cm^{3})
- Length: 43.375 in (1,101.7 mm)
- Width: 15.5 in (390 mm)
- Height: 37.5 in (950 mm)
- Dry weight: 509 lb (231 kg) (geared version)
- Designer: Fred Duesenberg

=== Components ===
- Valvetrain: Two intake and two exhaust valves per cylinder actuated by rocker arms
- Fuel system: 1 × Miller updraft carburetor
- Oil system: Wet sump, one pressure pump
- Cooling system: Pressurized water
- Reduction gear: 0.579:1

=== Performance ===
- Power output: 140 hp (100 kW)
- Specific power: 0.25 lb/cuin (2.2 kg/kW) (geared)
- Power-to-weight ratio: 3.64 lb/hp (2.31 kg/kW) (geared)

== See also ==
- Duesenberg Model H Direct V-16

Related lists

- List of aircraft engines

== Bibliography ==
- Gordon, Robert (August 2004). "The Gallaudet Story: Part 8A: The D-1 Hydroplane for the Navy". WWI Aero: The Journal of the Early Aeroplane (185): 30–45. ISSN 0736-198X.
- Gordon, Robert (November 2004). "The Gallaudet Story: Part 8B: The D-1 Hydroplane for the Navy". WWI Aero: The Journal of the Early Aeroplane (186): 12–21. ISSN 0736-198X.
- Pearce, William (2012). Duesenberg Aircraft Engines: A Technical Description. Los Osos, California: Old Machines Press. ISBN 978-0-9850353-0-3.
