= Maytag-Mason Motor Company =

Defunct American motor vehicle manufacturer

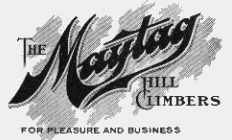
- The Hill Climber
- Formerly: Mason Automobile Company
- Founded: 1910; 115 years ago
- Defunct: 1912; 113 years ago
- Fate: Reorganized
- Successor: Mason Motor Company
- Headquarters: Waterloo, Iowa
- Key people: Frederick Maytag I, Fred & Augie Duesenberg, Edward Mason
- Products: Automobiles
- Production output: 983 Approx. (1910-1912)
- Brands: Maytag, Mason

The Maytag-Mason Motor Company of Waterloo, Iowa manufactured Maytag automobiles from 1910 to 1912. The company's founder was Frederick Louis Maytag I, who is better known for his development of the Maytag washing machine company.

== History ==
Maytag formed the company by purchasing a controlling interest in the Mason Automobile Company of Des Moines, Iowa, in 1909. That company, which had been created by Fred Duesenberg, August Duesenberg, and lawyer Edward R. Mason, had been producing an automobile called the Mason.

The former Waterloo Motor Works in Waterloo, Iowa, was purchased for automobile production. Maytag-Mason brought out a new four-cylinder engine and the larger car for 1910 was called Maytag. The two-cylinder engine car continued to be called the Mason.

Large parts purchases did not match slowing sales and the company went into receivership in 1911. Maytag sold his interest in the company, and in 1912 the company was reorganized as Mason Motor Company. This company went into receivership in 1915 and was closed down by 1917. Approximately 983 Maytag cars were built.

== Models ==
| Year | Engine | HP | Wheelbase |
|---|---|---|---|
| 1910 | Four-cylinder | 32/35 | 114 in (2,896 mm) |
| 1911 | two-cylinder | 20 | 96 in (2,438 mm) |
| 1911 | four-cylinder | 35 | 114 in (2,896 mm) |

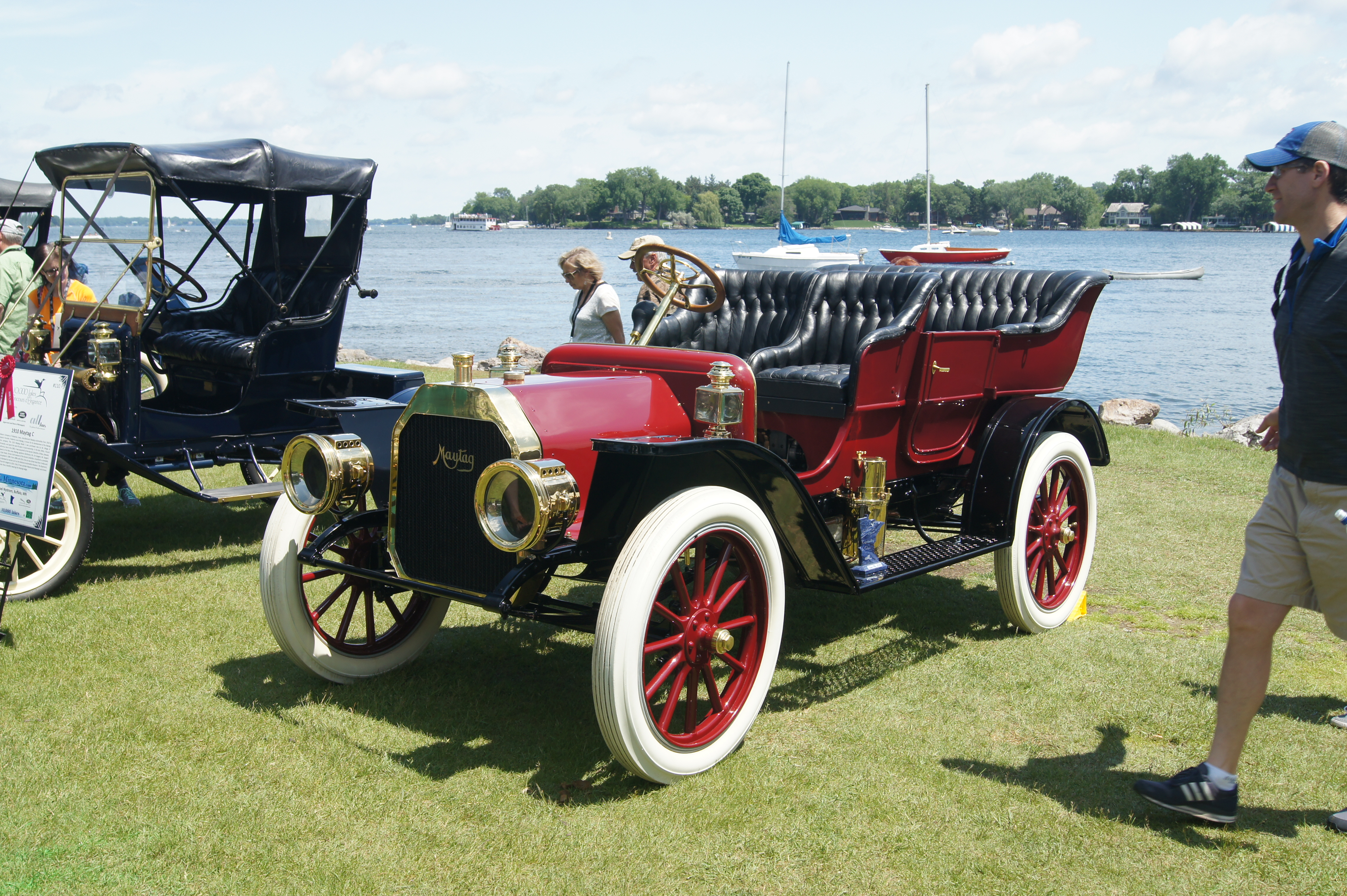
1910 Maytag Model C

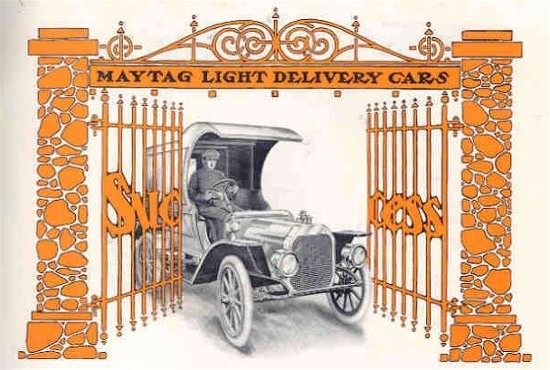
1911 Maytag-Mason Brochure

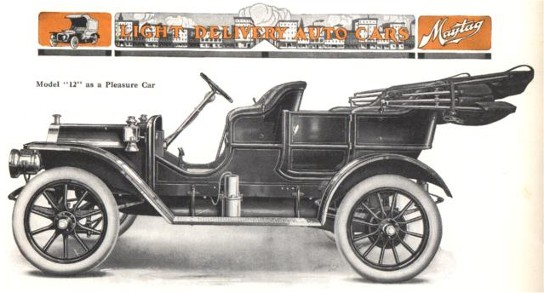
1911 Maytag Model 12

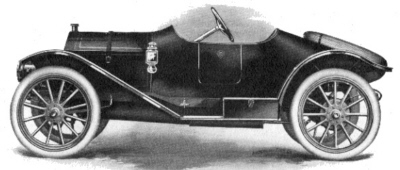
1911 Maytag Model H, Boattail Roadster

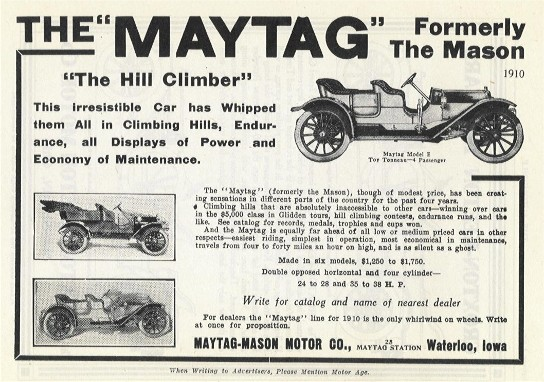
1911 Maytag- Mason Advertisement
