= Duesenberg straight-8 engine =

Duesenberg straight 8

Overview
- Manufacturer: Duesenberg/Lycoming
- Production: 1921–1937

Layout
- Configuration: Overhead cam multivalve overhead valve straight-8 engine

The Duesenberg straight-8 engine was produced from 1921 to 1937 and sold in Duesenberg automobiles. Fred and August Duesenberg got their start building experimental racing engines which achieved a great deal of success. Among their accomplishments are wins at the Indianapolis 500, the 1921 French Grand Prix and speed records at the Bonneville Salt Flats. They used the expertise they had gained to start building production engines and cars which were renowned for their performance and luxury.

Among the novel design features (for a pre-1940 production engine) seen on various Duesenberg engines are single- and double-overhead camshafts, three- and four-valve heads, superchargers and aluminum castings.

== Production engines ==
Duesenberg Model J engine
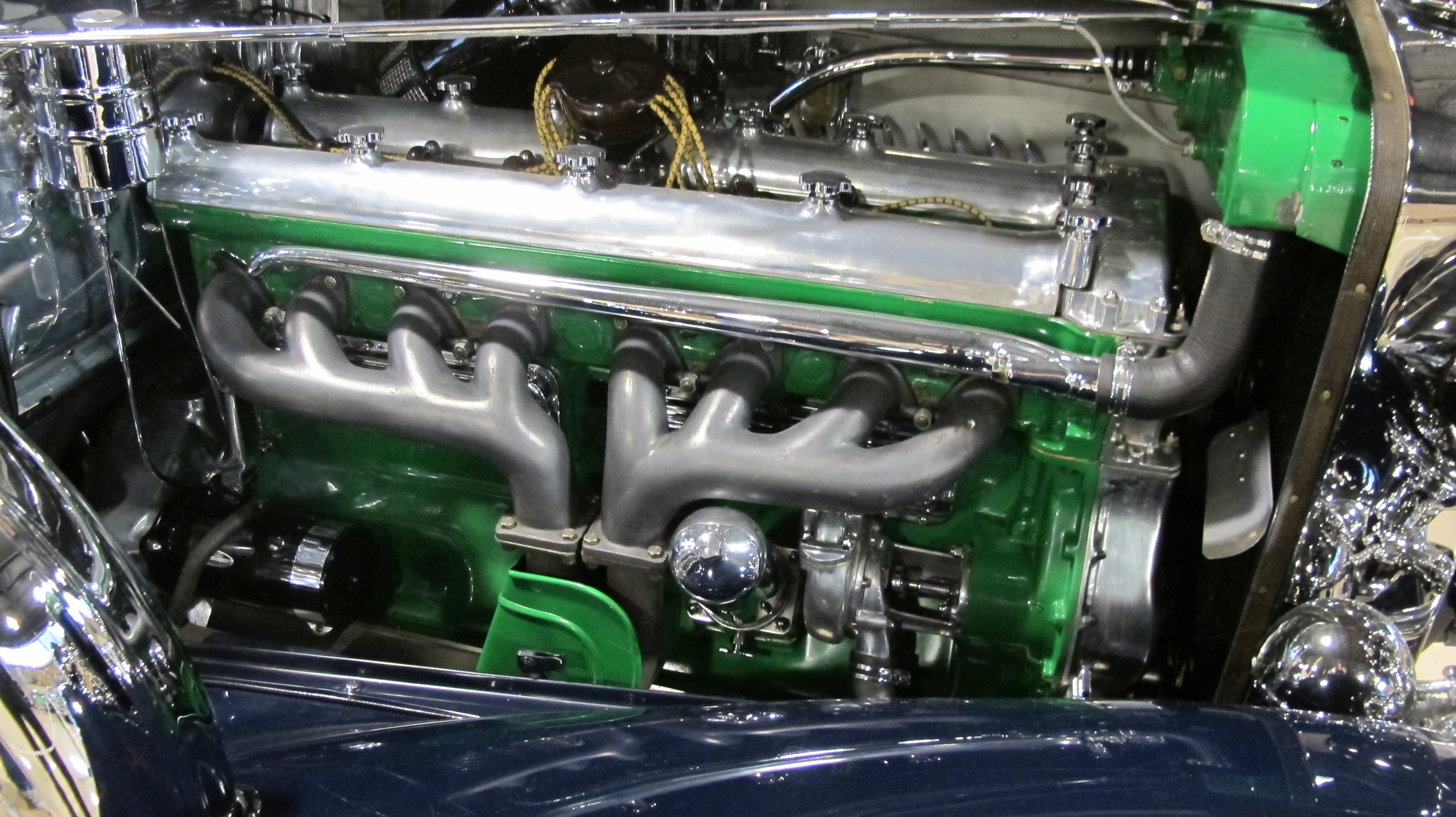

Overview
- Manufacturer: Duesenberg
- Production: 1928-1937

Layout
- Configuration: Straight-eight engine
- Displacement: 420 cu in (6,900 cc)
- Cylinder bore: 3.74 in (95 mm)
- Piston stroke: 4.76 in (121 mm)
- Cylinder block material: Cast iron
- Cylinder head material: Cast iron
- Valvetrain: DOHC, 4 valves per cylinder
- Compression ratio: 5.7:1

Combustion
- Supercharger: Duesenberg centrifugal (optional from 1932)
- Fuel system: Single updraft Schleber carburetor
- Fuel type: Gasoline
- Cooling system: Water-cooled

Output
- Power output: 265 hp (198 kW) at 4,250 rpm (normal); 320 hp (240 kW) at 4,200 rpm (supercharged)

Chronology
- Predecessor: Duesenberg Model A engine

Production	Engine	Displacement	Bore x stroke	Cam and valve	Model
1921–1927	260	259.7 cu in (4,256 cc)	2.875 in × 5.000 in (73.0 mm × 127.0 mm)	SOHC 2v	A, X
1928–1937	420	419.7 cu in (6,878 cc)	3.750 in × 4.750 in (95.3 mm × 120.7 mm)	DOHC 4v	J, SJ, SSJ

== Competition engines ==
The engines listed below were designed by Duesenberg for the Indianapolis 500. Some engines of the 122 CID and 91 CID design were bored/stroked to larger displacements for other races classes, after the 1930 rules change at Indianapolis.

Production	Engine	Displacement	Bore x stroke	Cam and valve
1919–1921	300	296.9 cu in (4,865 cc)	3.000 in × 4.750 in (76.2 mm × 120.7 mm)	SOHC 3v
1921-1923	183	183.0 cu in (2,999 cc)	2.500 in × 4.660 in (63.5 mm × 118.4 mm)	SOHC 3v
1923-1925	122	121.3 cu in (1,988 cc)	2.375 in × 3.422 in (60.3 mm × 86.9 mm)	DOHC 4v / DOHC 2v (supercharged)
1926–1929	91	90.3 cu in (1,480 cc)	2.286 in × 2.750 in (58.1 mm × 69.9 mm)	DOHC 4v
1930–1932	244	244 cu in (4,000 cc)	?	SOHC desmodromic

== See also ==
- Duesenberg 16-valve straight-4 aero engine
- Duesenberg Model H Direct V-16
- Multivalve
