= Simeone Foundation Automotive Museum =

- Simeone Foundation Automotive Museum Simeone Foundation Automotive Museum (the United States)
- Established: 17 June 2008; 18 years ago
- Location: Philadelphia, Pennsylvania, USA
- Coordinates: 39.910907°N 75.226624°W
- Type: Automobile museum
- Key holdings: 1964 Shelby Daytona Coupe; 1966 Ford GT40 Mk II; 1970 Porsche 917LH; 1936 Bugatti Type 57G Tank; 1963 Chevrolet Corvette Grand Sport; 1937 Alfa Romeo 8C 2900B MM; 1958 Aston Martin DBR1; 1958 Ferrari 250 Testa Rossa; 1956 Jaguar D-Type; 1933 Alfa Romeo 8C 2300 Monza
- Collection size: 70+ cars
- Founder: Frederick A. Simeone
- Curator: Kevin Kelly
- Owners: Frederick A. Simeone MD Foundation, Inc.
- Parking: On site (no charge)
- Website: www.simeonemuseum.org

The Simeone Foundation Automotive Museum is an automotive museum located at 6825 Norwitch Drive in Philadelphia, Pennsylvania. The museum's collection consists of approximately 75 racing sports cars and has been assembled over more than 50 years by Frederick A. Simeone, a retired neurosurgeon and native of Philadelphia. Frederick Simeone has been ranked the #1 car collector by the Classic Car Trust Registry.

== History ==
Frederick Simeone's father was a general practitioner who ran his medical practice out of a rowhouse in the Kensington section of Philadelphia. When his father died in 1972, Simeone was left with $8,000 and 4 cars which were stored in a garage on Clearfield Street. He grew this collection over the next four decades, and in 2008 he donated the entire collection of cars to the museum's foundation, which now owns the titles to the cars. From 1982 until the museum's opening in June 2008, the cars were stored in a garage near 8th and Lombard Streets in Philadelphia.

Dr. Simeone died at the age of 86 on June 11, 2022.

== Criteria for inclusion ==
The museum has several criteria for inclusion into the collection:

1. The car must be a sports car with headlights and fenders.
2. The car must have a history of road racing (not solely racing on a track).
3. The car must be considered significant, or "winners" associated with superior racing performance.
4. Important components, such as the chassis, engine, and body, must be original to the car.

== Demonstration Days program ==
The museum conducts a Demonstration Days program twice per month, where several cars are moved to the 3-acre parking lot behind the museum. The program consists of a themed educational presentation followed by a driving demonstration where the cars are operated by the museum curator. Upon conclusion of the Demonstration Days program, museum guests are permitted to inspect and photograph the cars.

== Library ==
The museum has a library containing a collection of automotive literature, documents and sales brochures dating back to 1892. The collection was formerly held in boxes in a building in Center City Philadelphia, and was moved into the museum's newly constructed library in 2013. Due to the fragility of the materials, the library and collection are not open to the public.

== Exhibits and collection ==
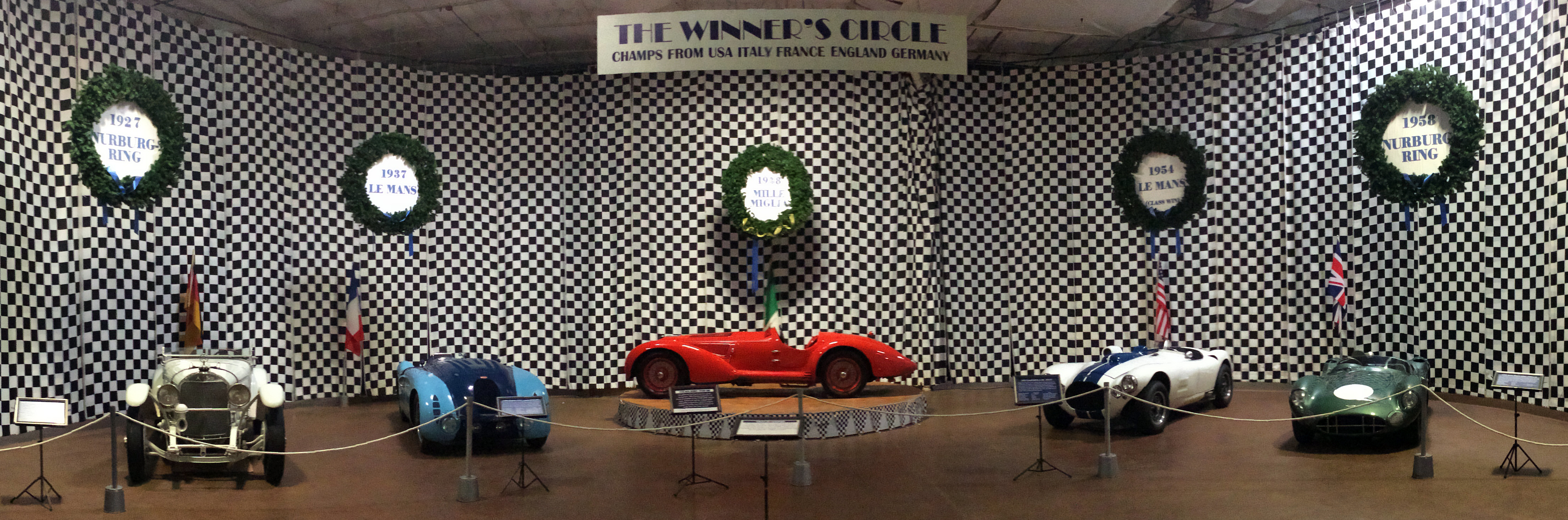
The Winners Circle exhibit at the Simeone Foundation Automotive Museum

The Simeone Foundation Automotive Museum consists of 21 exhibits and 70 cars in the permanent collection. The cars are arranged chronologically and in diorama vignettes. Several motor racing venues are represented as exhibits, including Le Mans, Nürburgring, Sebring, Bonneville, Watkins Glen, Brooklands, Mille Miglia and Targa Florio. The museum's collection has been called "one of the finest collections of rare and important racing sports cars in the world". Nearly every car in the collection has its original body. Most of the cars are currently in drivable condition. The museum uses aviation gasoline in the car since it is more stable than regularly available gasoline, and it still contains some lead. Lead is essential as an anti-knock compound in order to operate these older engines.

List of exhibits and cars:

| Exhibit name | Car(s) in exhibit |
|---|---|
| Endurance Trial | 1909 American Underslung Traveler |
| Pre World War I Racing | 1912 National Model 40 Semi-Racing Roadster; 1916 Stutz Series 4C Bearcat; 1913 Mercer Raceabout Series 35J |
| Automobile Racing Club of America | 1927 Bentley 3 Litre Speed Model; 1929 Alfa Romeo 6C 1750 SS |
| Watkins Glen | 1950 Allard J2; 1963 Chevrolet Corvette Grand Sport |
| Bonneville Salt Flats | 1937 Supercharged Cord 812; 1954 Austin-Healey 100-4; 1964 Shelby Cobra Daytona Coupe |
| Brooklands Track | 1933 Alfa Romeo 8C 2300 Mille Miglia Spyder; 1925 Alfa Romeo RLSS |
| Timed Trials | 1931 Bentley 4.5 Litre Supercharged Tourer |
| Hillclimb | 1921 Vauxhall 30/98E Velox Tourer |
| Nürburgring | 1937 BMW 328; 1955 Mercedes-Benz 300SL Gullwing Coupe |
| Match Race | 1928 Stutz BB Black Hawk Speedster |
| Targa Florio | 1926 Bugatti Type 35; 1975 Alfa Romeo 33 TT 12 |
| Mille Miglia | 1937 Alfa Romeo 8C 2900A; 1933 Alfa Romeo 8C 2300 Monza |
| Rifornimento | 1924 Lancia Lambda Third Series Tourer |
| Sporty Cars | 1912 Hudson Mile-a-Minute Roadster; 1916 Oakland Speedster; 1922 Paige 6-66 Daytona Speedster; 1926 Kissel 8-75 Speedster; 1929 duPont Model G Speedster; 1928 Auburn 8-88 Boat Tail Speedster; 1933 Auburn V12 12-165 Speedster; 1935 Auburn 851 Boat Tail Speedster; 1933 Squire Roadster; 1949 Alfa Romeo 6C 2500 Brixia; 1956 Mercedes-Benz 300SL Gullwing Coupe; 1963 Chevrolet Corvette Grand Sport Replica Body; 1966 Chevrolet Corvette 427 Roadster; 1990 Nissan 300ZX Twin Turbo |
| History of NASCAR | 1938 Ford Coupe Louise Smith Replica; 1953 Hudson Hornet Twin H-Power; 1970 Plymouth Superbird; 1998 Ford Thunderbird NASCAR; 2002 NASCAR Dyno Mule |
| Sebring | 1953 Jaguar C-Type; 1956 Jaguar D-Type |
| Rally Racing | 1938 Jaguar SS-100 3.5L; 1948 Talbot-Lago T26 Grand Sport Coupe |
| Le Mans | 1933 Alfa Romeo 8C 2300 Le Mans; 1934 MG K3 Magnette; 1936 Aston Martin LeMans; 1938 Peugeot 402 Darl'Mat Racer; 1936/48 Delahaye 135S; 1954 Ferrari 375 MM Pinin Farina Spyder; 1956 Maserati 300S; 1958 Ferrari 250 Testa Rossa; 1959 Ferrari 250 GT Interim Berlinetta; 1970 Porsche 917 LH |
| America's 1st International Win | 1921 Duesenberg 183 Grand Prix Race Car |
| America at Le Mans | 1927 Stutz Black Hawk; 1929 Stutz Supercharged Le Mans; 1929 duPont Le Mans Speedster; 1966 Ford GT40 MK II; 1967 Ford MK IV |
| Winner's Circle | 1927 Mercedes Benz S-Type Sportwagen; 1936 Bugatti Type 57G Tank; 1938 Alfa Romeo 8C 2900B MM Spyder; 1952 Cunningham C-4R Roadster; 1958 Aston Martin DBR1 |

== Publications ==
- The Spirit of Competition - Coachbuilt Press, 2009
- The Stewardship of Historically Important Automobiles - Coachbuilt Press, 2012

== Awards won ==
- 2019 #1 Ranking of the Top 100 Classic Car Collectors
- 2017 International Historic Motoring Awards "Museum or Collection of the Year"
- 2014 International Historic Motoring Awards "Car of the Year" - 1964 Shelby Cobra Daytona Coupe
- 2014 Historic Vehicle Association: 1st automobile added to National Historic Vehicle Register - 1964 Shelby Cobra Daytona Coupe
- 2012 International Historic Motoring Awards "Publication of the Year" - The Stewardship of Historically Important Automobiles
- 2011 International Historic Motoring Awards "Museum of the Year"

== Spirit of Competition Award ==
The "Spirit of Competition" is the theme of the museum and the title of an annual award given a person from the world of motorsports.

Past recipients of the award include:

- 2008 Mario Andretti
- 2009 Janet Guthrie
- 2010 John Fitch
- 2011 Craig Breedlove
- 2012 Sam Posey
- 2013 Hurley Haywood
- 2014 Bobby Rahal
- 2015 David Hobbs
- 2016 Peter Brock
- 2017 Derek Bell
- 2018 Roger Penske
