= Auburn Speedster =

American automobile model (1925–1937)

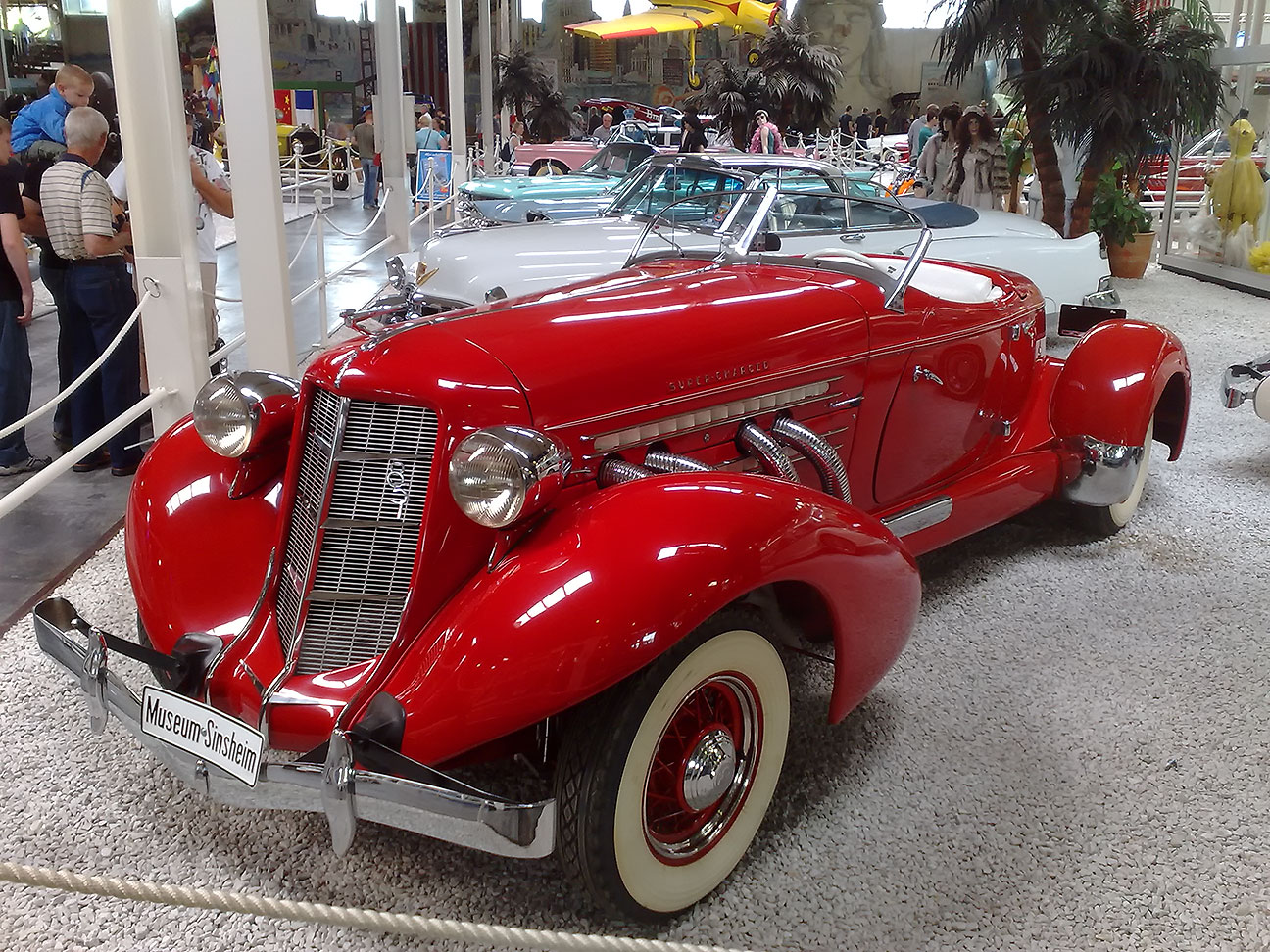
- 1935 Auburn Boattail Speedster 851SC

Overview
- Manufacturer: Auburn Automobile Company
- Production: 1925–1937
- Assembly: Auburn, Indiana; Union City, Indiana
- Designer: Alan Leamy (Series I and II); Gordon Buehrig (Series III)

Body and chassis
- Body style: 2-door speedster

Powertrain
- Engine: 4.8L side-valve Lycoming engine 6.4L V12 Lycoming
- Transmission: Three speed manual with synchromesh on second and third ratios in 'high'

Dimensions
- Length: 4,930 mm (194 in)
- Width: 1,800 mm (71 in)
- Curb weight: 1,700 kg (3,700 lb)

The Auburn Speedster is an American car, manufactured by the Auburn Automobile Company of Auburn, Indiana, and manufactured in Union City, Indiana. A total of 887 cars were manufactured between 1928 and 1936, across 3 series (1928-1930 with "eight" and "big eight" engines, 8 cylinder 1931-1933, 12 cylinder 1932-1934, and the dramatic, iconic 1935-36 Supercharged 8). The first two series were designed by stylist Alan Leamy. The Auburn 851 Speedster of 1935 was styled by designer Gordon Buehrig, who also was responsible for the Cord Model 810. Al Jenkins broke 70 American speed records in the 1935 car.

== History ==
In 1924 Auburn output was down to six cars a day, Errett Lobban Cord—a successful automobile salesman—took over the distressed company, and brought in James Crawford to design and develop a new range of vehicles. Other companies had already produced cars with 'boat tail" styling (Peerless, Packard, Hudson) but Auburn wanted to have an image leader in the segment. The Speedster had a fixed windshield, but no side windows, no interior door release, an optional roof, a cockpit for only two in an aerodynamic body.

=== First Series, 1928-1930 Auburn Eight (Eight-In-Line / 8-88 / Speedster 115, 120 and 125) ===
The first Auburn eight model was introduced in 1925, as the "Auburn Eight-In-Line". In the following year, it received an ungraded 4.8-liter side-valve 68 bhp Lycoming engine and was renamed "8-88".

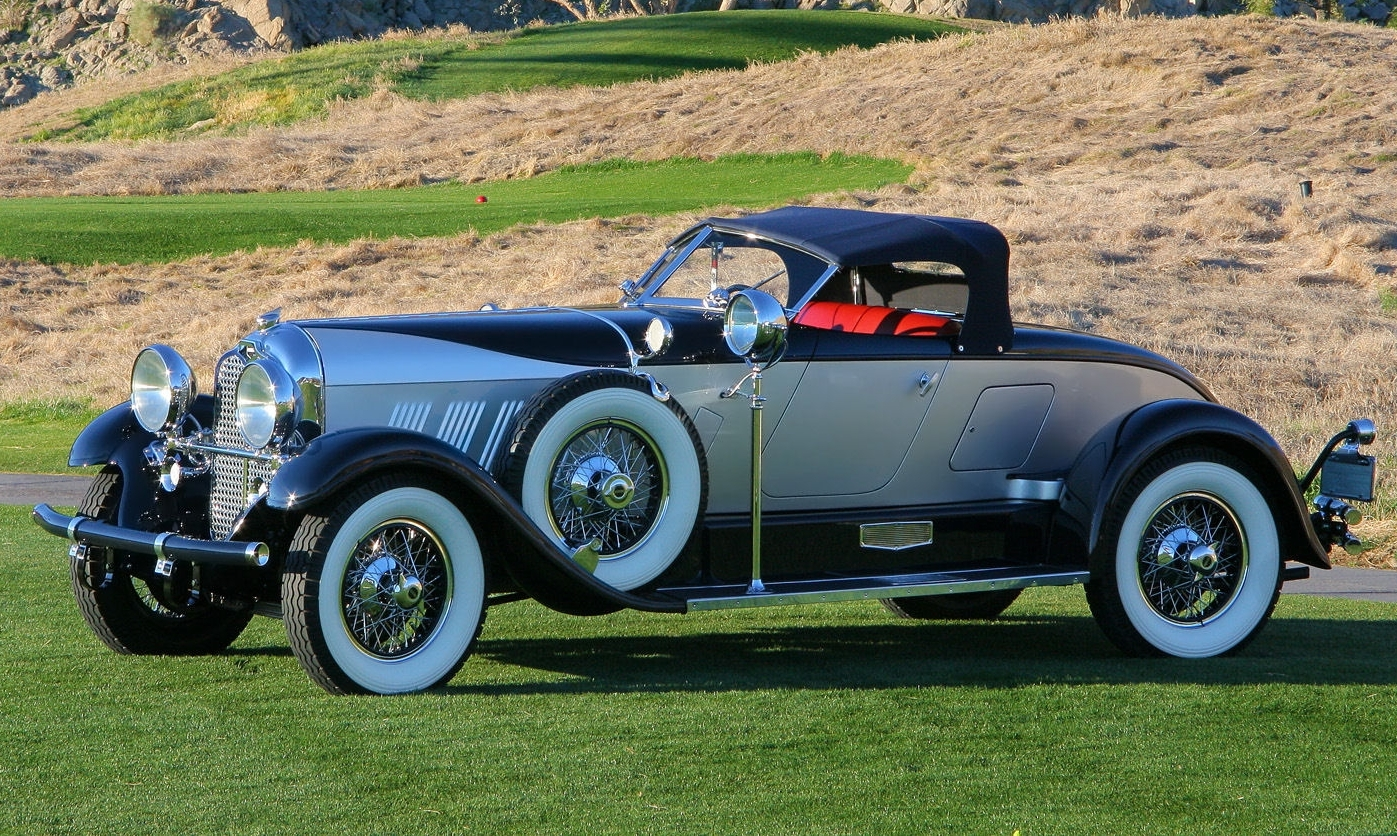
1929 Auburn 120 Boattail Speedster

That powertrain remained in use until 1930, when it developed 115 bhp, hence the "Speedster 115" model name. The car was of a straightforward and stout design. Suspension was by semi-elliptic springs all round, and after experiments with hydraulic brakes, Auburn opted for mechanical brakes. The three-speed gearbox was in unit with the engine. The open two-seater body styled by Count Alexis de Sakhnoffsky featured a boat-tail and a vee windscreen.

The "Auburn Speedster 120" with the so-called "big eight" 268 cubic inch, 120 hp engine were built in 1928 and 1929. On a longer chassis and with a longer hood than the 8-88, 100 were built and today only maybe 8 are known to survive.

In 1930, the Auburn Speedster was upgraded and it was renamed "Speedster 125". The Speedster 125 was advertised as a "racing car with comfort of a closed car" with a 125 bhp version of the Lycoming eight giving it a top speed of over 100 mph. It came with models such as "cabin speedster" and others.

=== Second series, 1931-1934 the Speedster 160 ===
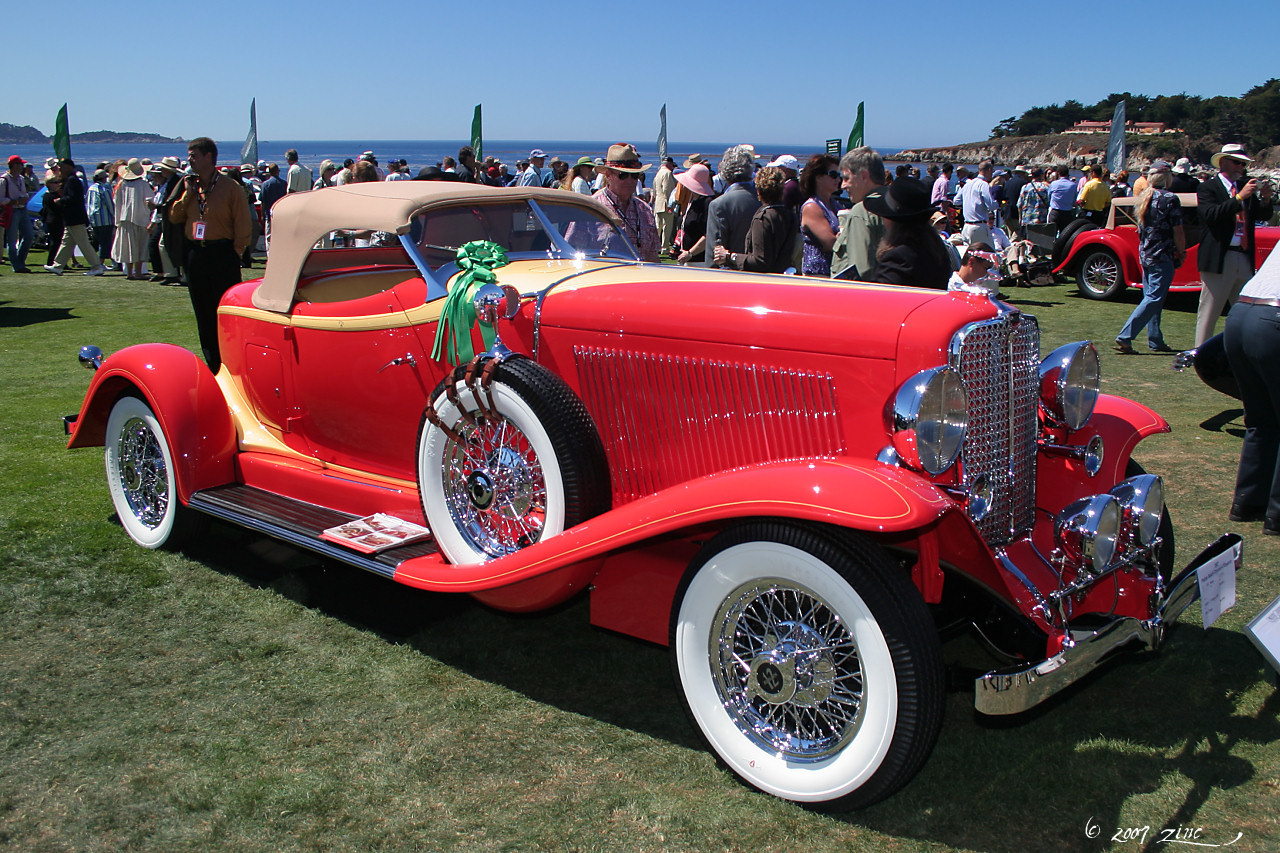
1933 Auburn Speedster

In 1931, Auburn 12 a V12 range, using a 6.4-liter engine designed by George Kublin and built by Lycoming Engines. As the Great Depression was taking hold, the V12 was expensive and only about 25 of the "Auburn Speedster 160" were built. The V12 engine design was successful, and was used as the basis of the LaFrance engine, used for decades especially in fire trucks.

=== Third Series, 1935-1936 the Speedster 851/852 ===
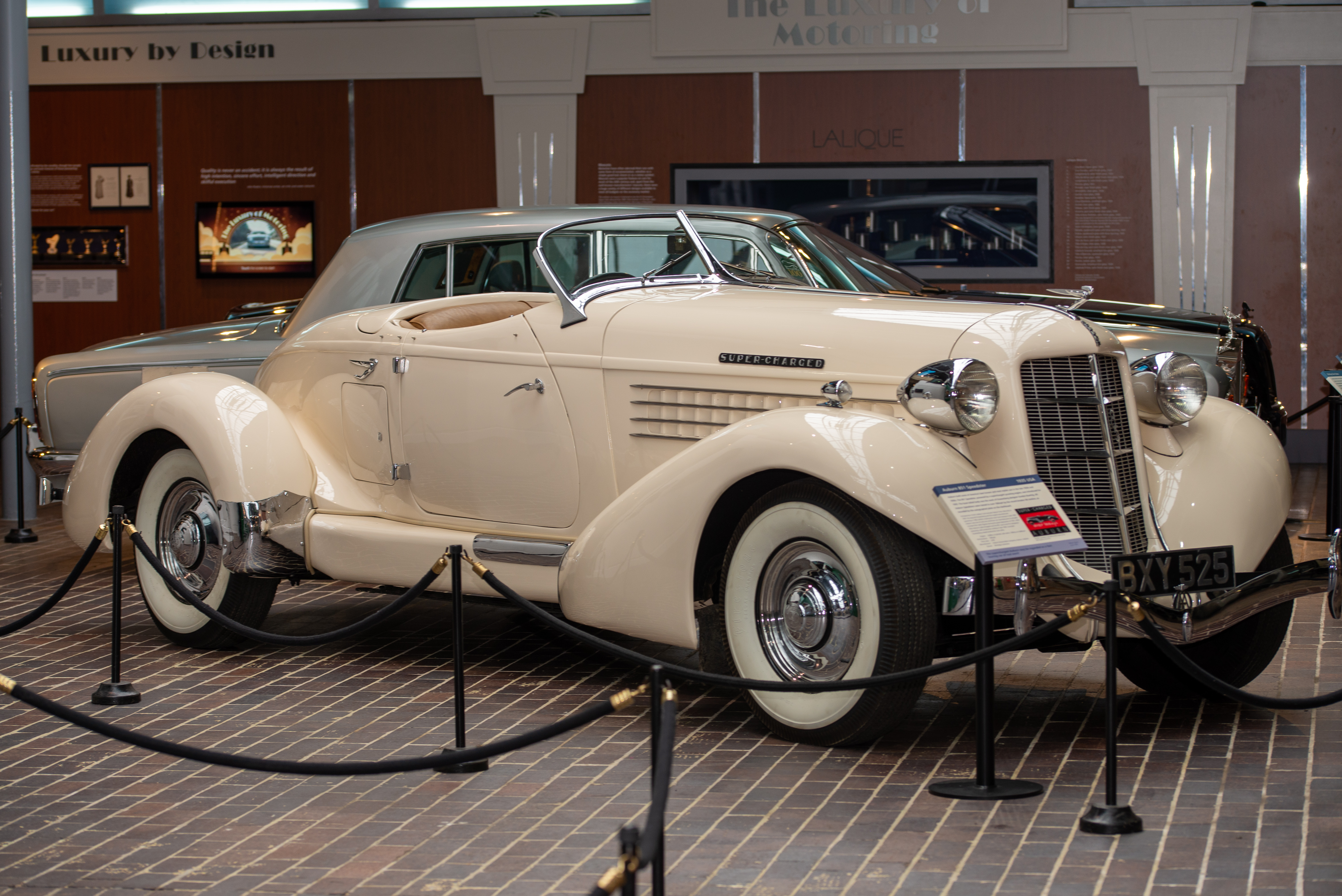
1935 Auburn Speedster 851SC

The "Speedster 851", which would be the final production model of the manufacturer, was introduced in 1934 with bodywork by Gordon Buehrig that was ingeniously constructed and cost-effectively built. With sandwiched front and rear fenders, a backswept radiator, and external side-threaded exhaust pipes, the 851 Speedster is the iconic Auburn "Hollywood car." Its flat-head straight-eight engine was powerful, reliable and of a strong and solid design.

The sweeping body lines concealed some innovative and advanced technical features, such as the Columbia dual-ratio rear axle, that was achieved by interposing an epicyclic gear train between the axle and the crown wheel. When it was engaged, the final drive ratio became a "fast" 4.5:1. It was disengaged by moving a steering-wheel mounted lever and dipping the clutch, whereupon the ratio became a more leisurely 3:1. The three-speed synchromesh gearbox along with that dual ratio axle gave a six-speed transmission.

The 852, introduced in 1936, was identical but for the "852" badge on the radiator grille. The final year of production was 1937, when Auburn ceased car production altogether. A total of 143 supercharged 851/852SC boat tail speedsters were made.

Evocation of the Speedster's iconic "boattail" design would make a rare appearance in later decades. Two notable examples include the 1963–1967 Chevrolet Corvette Stingray coupe and the third generation 1971–1973 Buick Riviera.

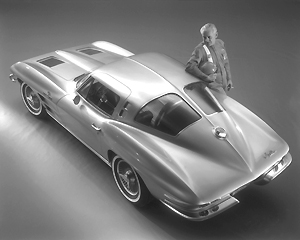
1963 Corvette Sting Ray Coupe

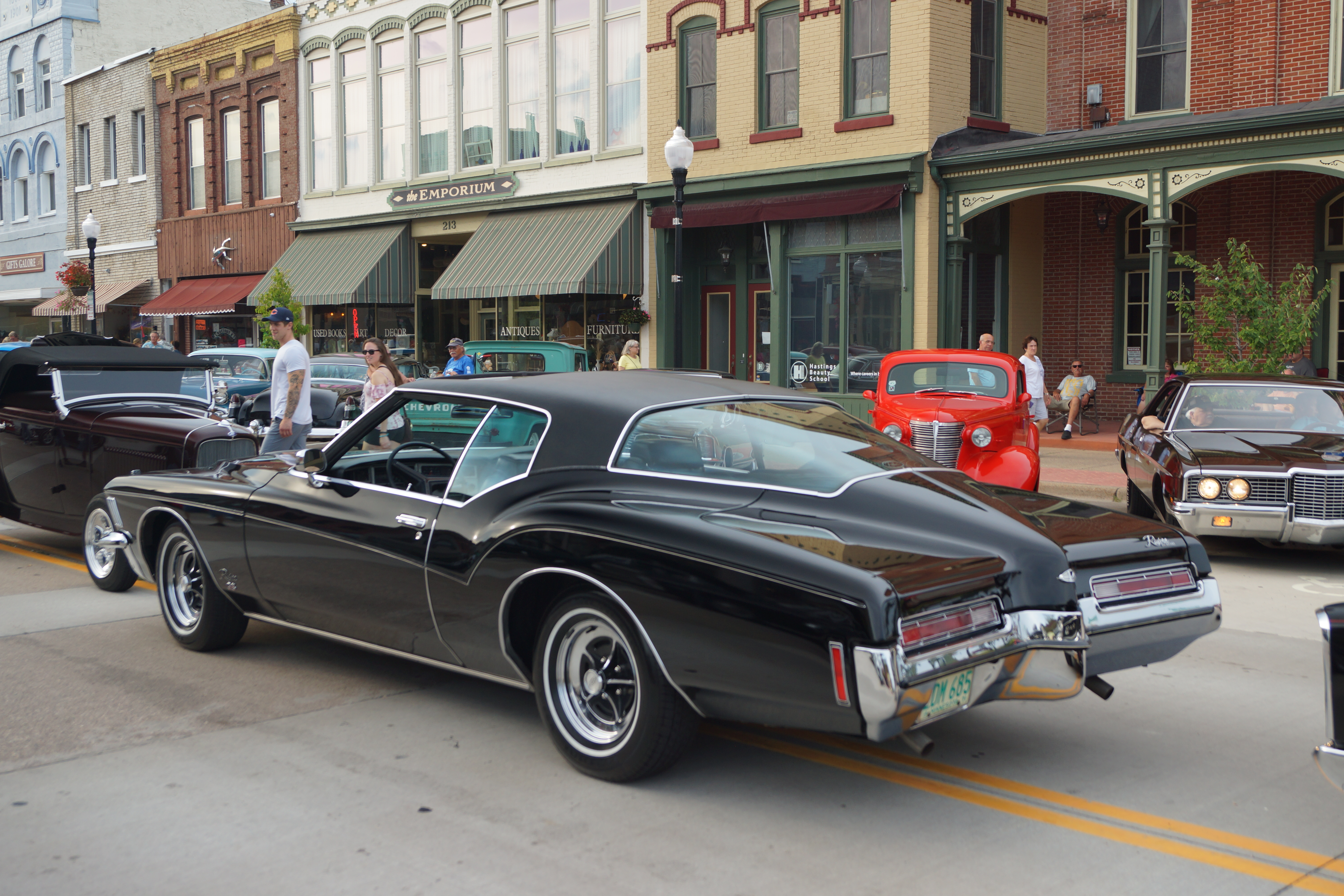
1972 Buick Riviera rear

==== Design and statistics (Speedster 851) ====
===== Engine =====
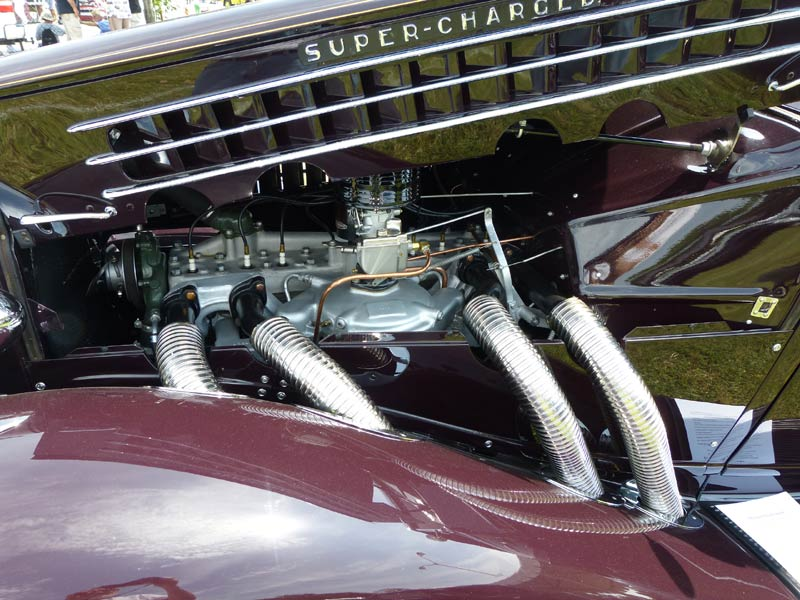
Auburn 851 engine

- Location: Front, longitudinal.
- Type: Water-cooled in-line flathead side-valve eight cylinder with aluminum alloy cylinder head.
- Cubic capacity: 4585 cc/280 cu in.
- Bore x stroke: 77.78 mm × 120.6 mm (3.062 in × 4.748 in)
- Valve gear: Two in-line valves per cylinder operated by block mounted camshaft.
- Fuel supply: Single Stromberg downdraft carburettor with Schweitzer-Cummins centrifugal supercharger.
- Ignition: Coil and distributor, mechanical.
- Maximum power: 150 bhp at 4000 rpm

===== Transmission =====
- Layout: Clutch and gearbox in unit with engine.
- Clutch: Single dry plate
- Gearbox: Three speed manual with synchromesh on second and third ratios in 'high'

1st 2.86:1
2nd 1.68:1
3rd 1.0:1

- Final drive: Spiral bevel with epicyclic gear dual ratio axle.
- Ratio: 3:1 and 4.5:1

===== Suspension =====
- Front: Non-independent with semi-elliptic leaf springs and hydraulic dampers.
- Rear: Non-independent with live axle, semi-elliptic leaf springs and hydraulic dampers.

===== Steering =====
- Type: Worm and peg.

===== Brakes =====
- Type: Lockheed drums front and rear; hydraulically operated.

===== Wheel and tires =====
- Type: Steel welded spoke wheels with 6.50″ × 15″

===== Body/chassis =====
- Type: Steel box section X-braced chassis with steel Speedster body, two doors, two seats.

===== Dimensions and weight =====
- Length: 4,930 mm (194 in)
- Width: 1,800 mm (71 in)
- Weight: 1,700 kg (3,700 lb)

===== Performance =====
- Maximum speed: 100 mph (160 km/h)

== Company timeline ==
- 1926: Engine size increased from 4.5 liters to 4.8 liters and the model renamed the 8-88.
- 1927: The 68 hp engine uprated to 115 hp and the car is renamed the 115.
- 1929: 120 development of 115 introduced.
- 1930: 125 introduced.
- 1931: 160 introduced
- 1934: The best known Speedster—the 851—was introduced for the 1935 model year. It uses a 4.6-liter straight-eight engine, supercharged or unblown.
- 1937: Auburn car production ceased.

== In media ==
A supercharged 851SC driven by Marlene Dietrich plays a prominent role in the 1936 romantic comedy/caper film Desire.

A 1935 Auburn 851 Phaeton Sedan appears during the "New Amsterdam Inn" number in the 1936 Fred Astaire-Ginger Rogers film Swing Time.

An Auburn Speedster is featured in the 1936 British film Lonely Road. Clive Brook refers to it as an "Auburn Supercharger".

An Auburn 851/2 Speedster is driven by Frankie Darro in the 1936 film Headline Crasher.

An Auburn 851 Speedster is driven by Loretta Young in the 1937 film Love Is News.

In the 1982-1987 TV series Remington Steele, the title character drives a 1936 Auburn Speedster.

During the Shanghai chase scene in the 1984 film Indiana Jones and the Temple of Doom, Indiana Jones' getaway vehicle is an Auburn Boattail Speedster. The car used in the film was a purpose-built replica rather than an original model.

In early Batman comics, the Batmobile appears to be modeled after an Auburn 851 Speedster.

== Gallery ==
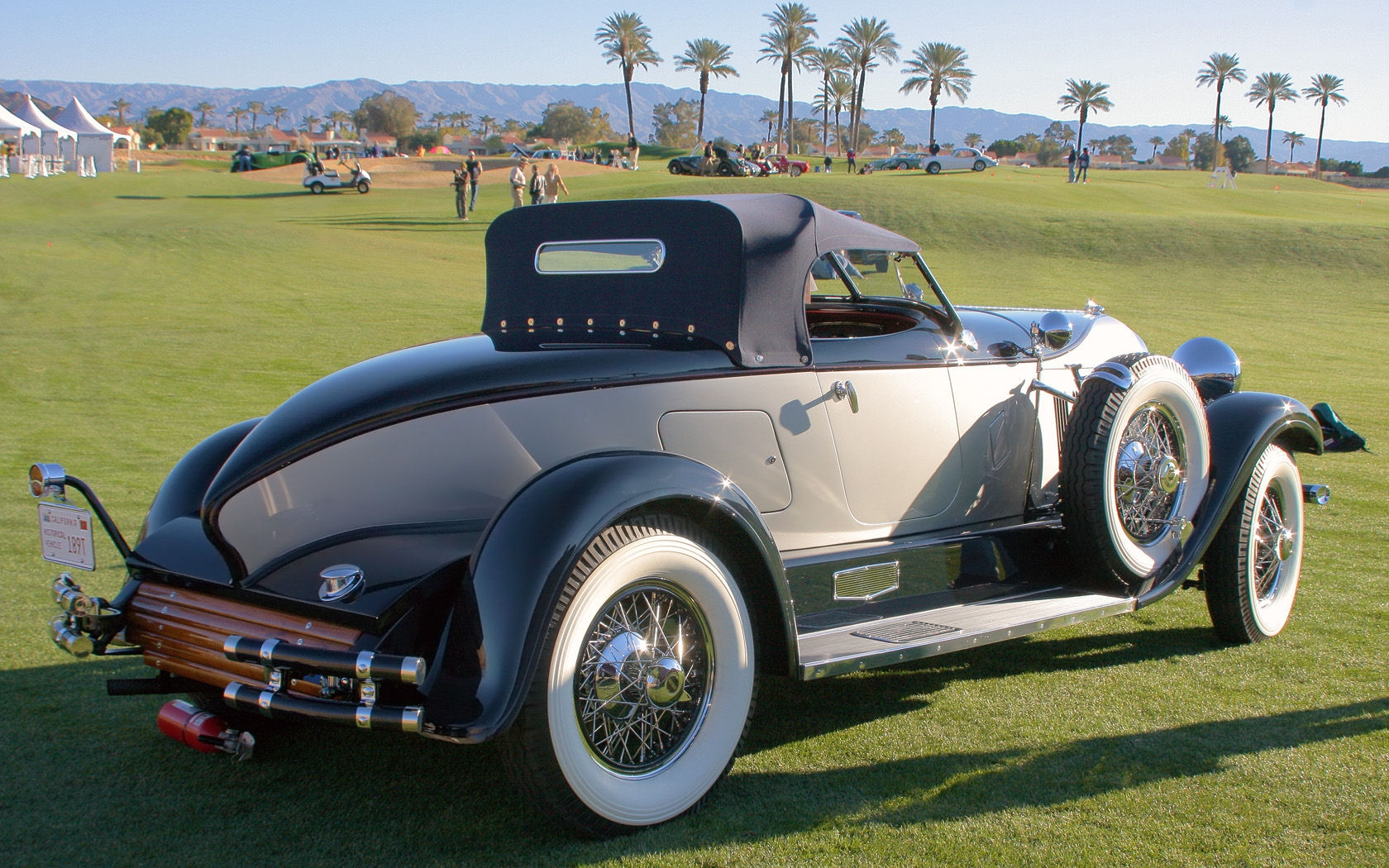
1929 Auburn 120 Boattail Speedster rear

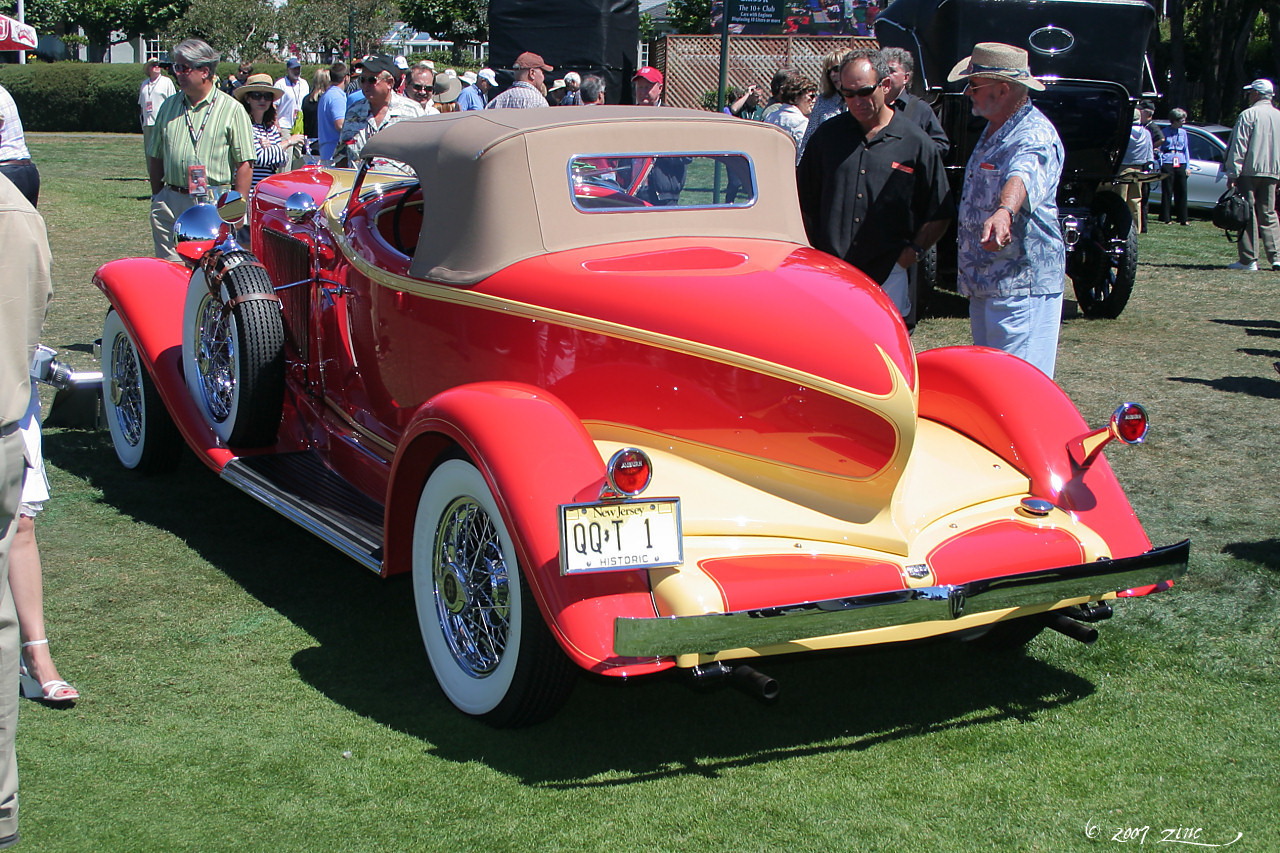
1933 Auburn Speedster rear

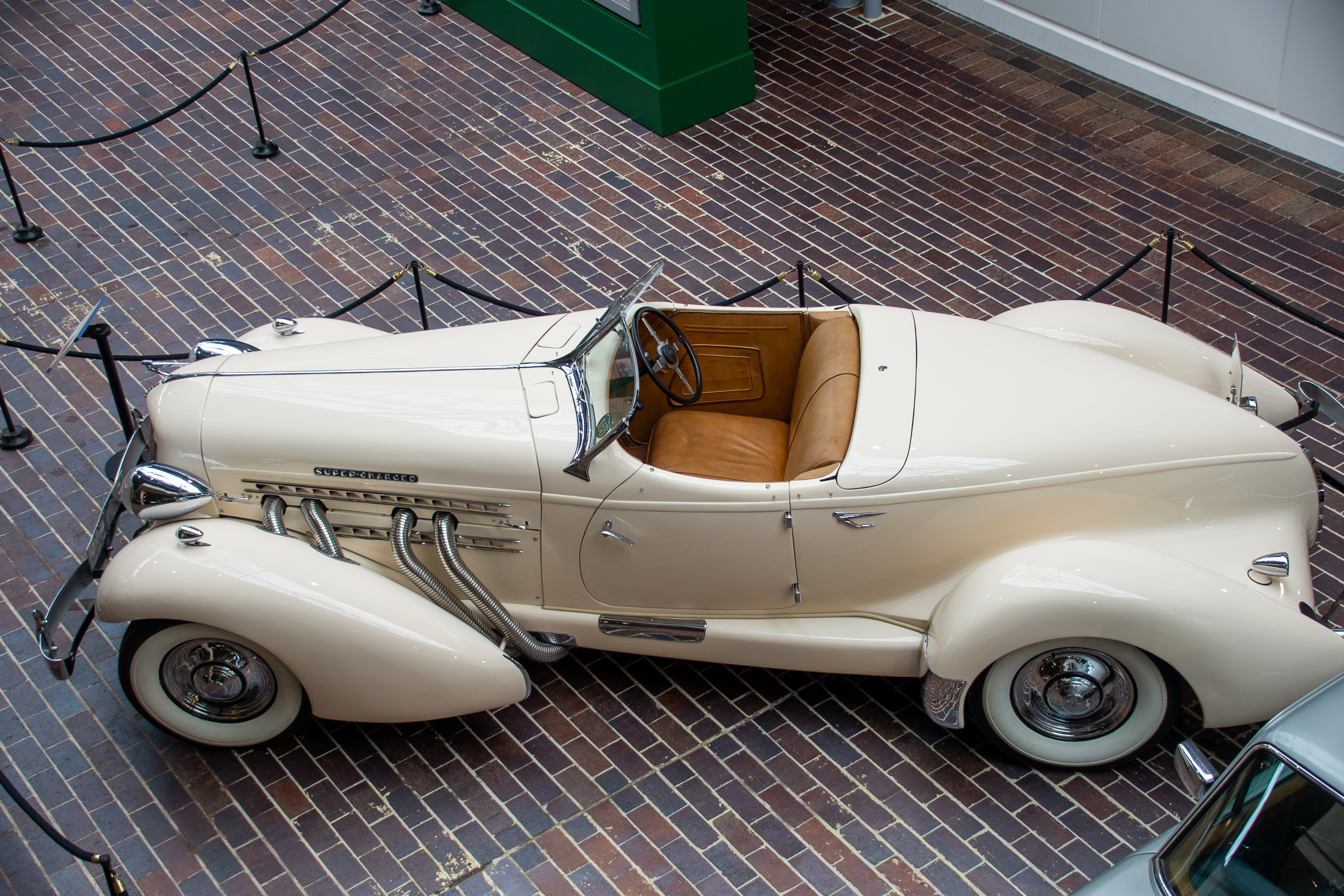
1935 Auburn Speedster 851SC overhead view

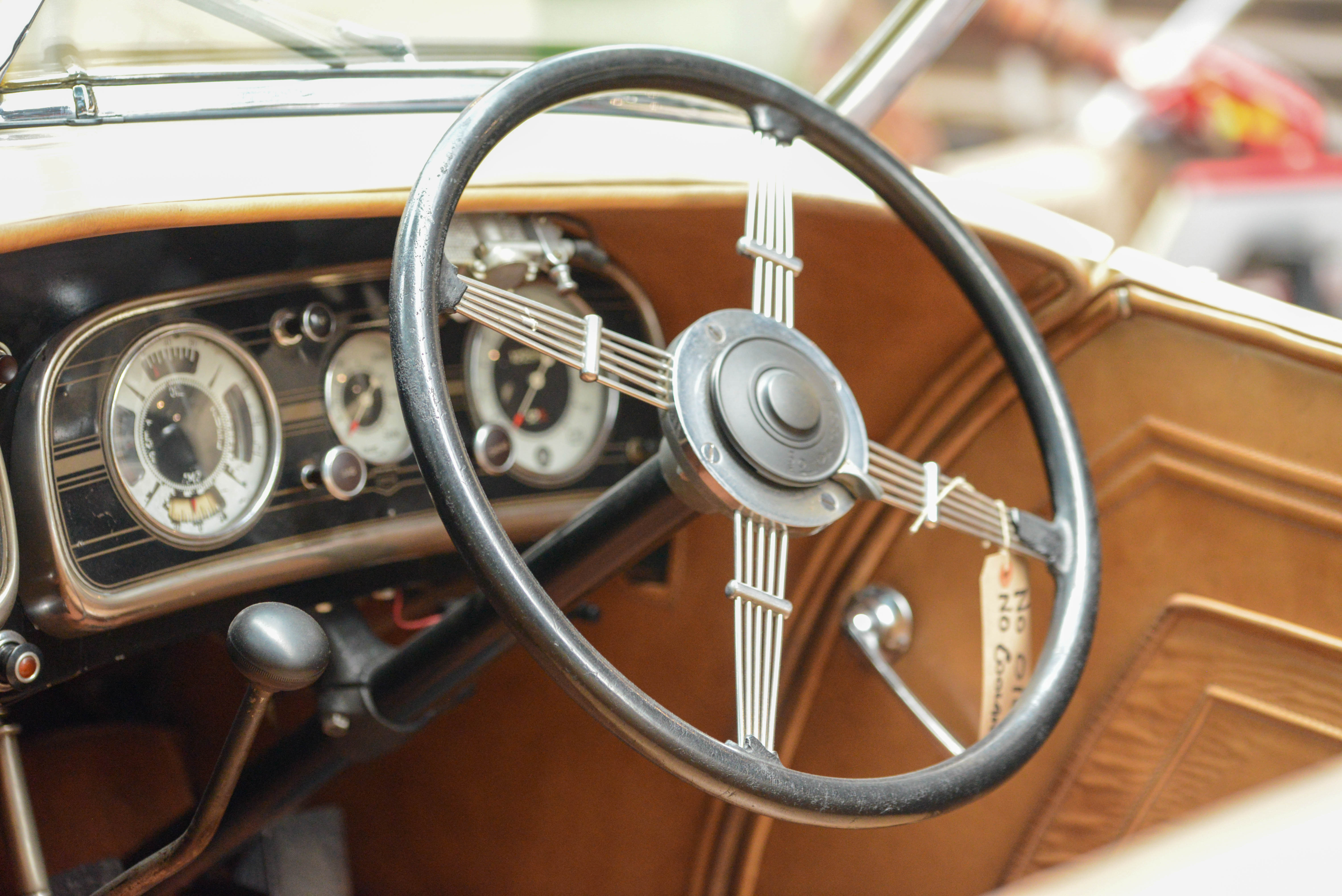
1935 Auburn Speedster 851SC dashboard

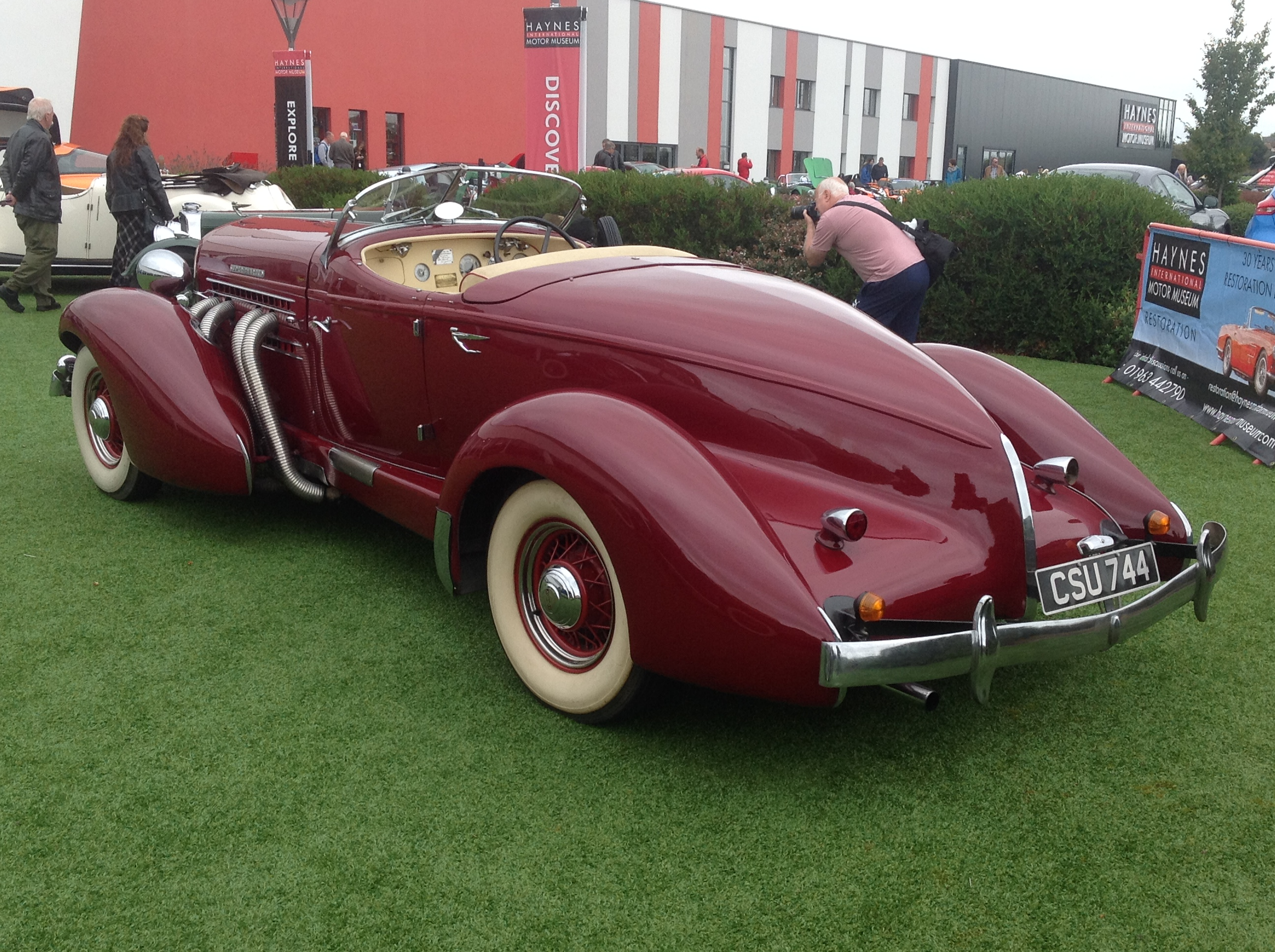
1936 Auburn Speedster 851SC rear

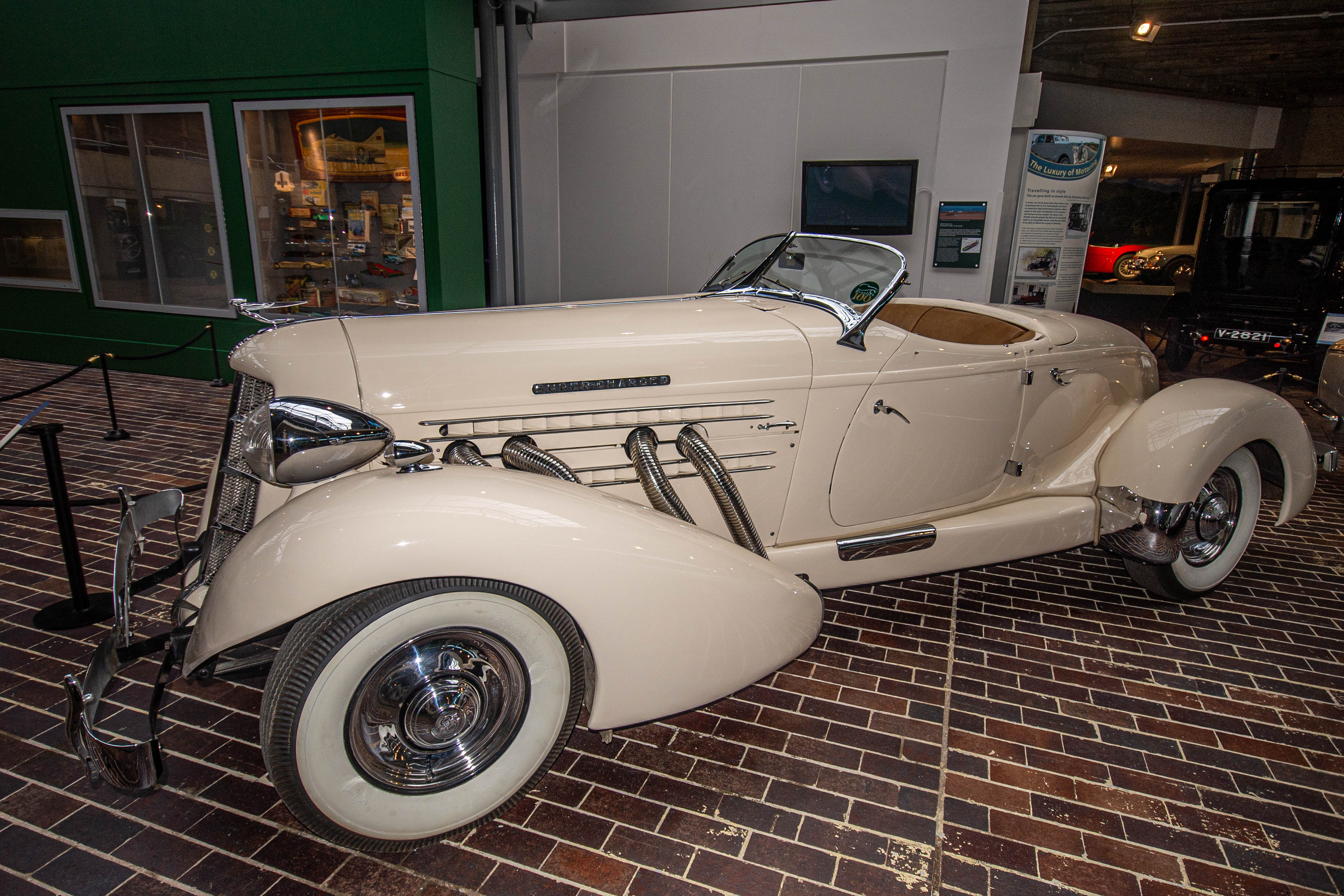
Auburn 851SC Speedster
