= Auburn Automobile Company =

Defunct American motor vehicle manufacturer

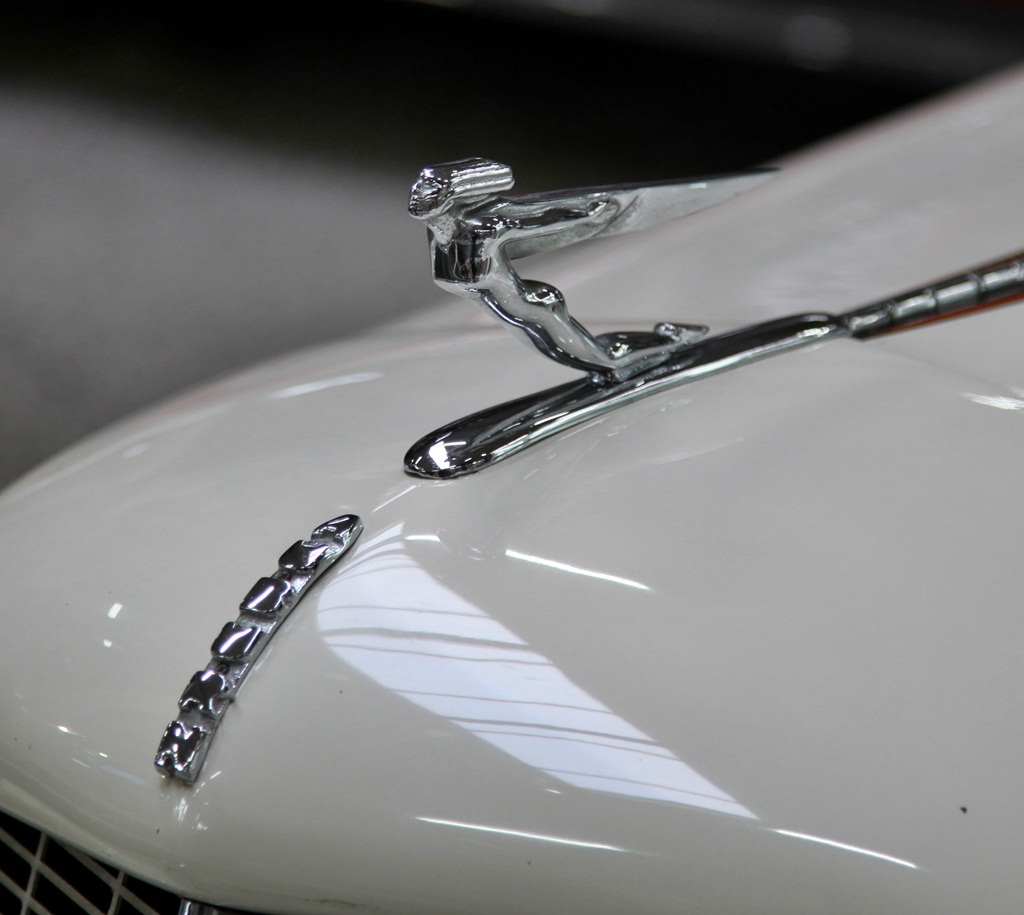
- Auburn hood ornament
- Industry: Automotive
- Predecessor: Eckhart Carriage Company
- Founded: September 29, 1903; 122 years ago in Auburn, Indiana
- Founder: Frank and Morris Eckhart
- Defunct: 1937; 89 years ago
- Fate: Bankruptcy & Merged with Cord
- Successor: Auburn-Central / American Central Manufacturing Corporation
- Headquarters: Auburn, Indiana, United States
- Area served: United States
- Key people: Frank and Morris Eckhart; E.L. Cord
- Products: Automobiles; Automotive parts

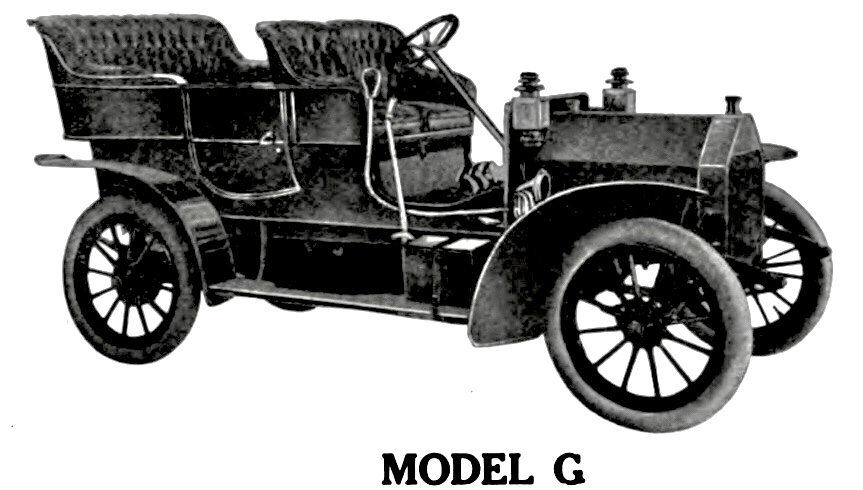
Auburn Model G (1908)

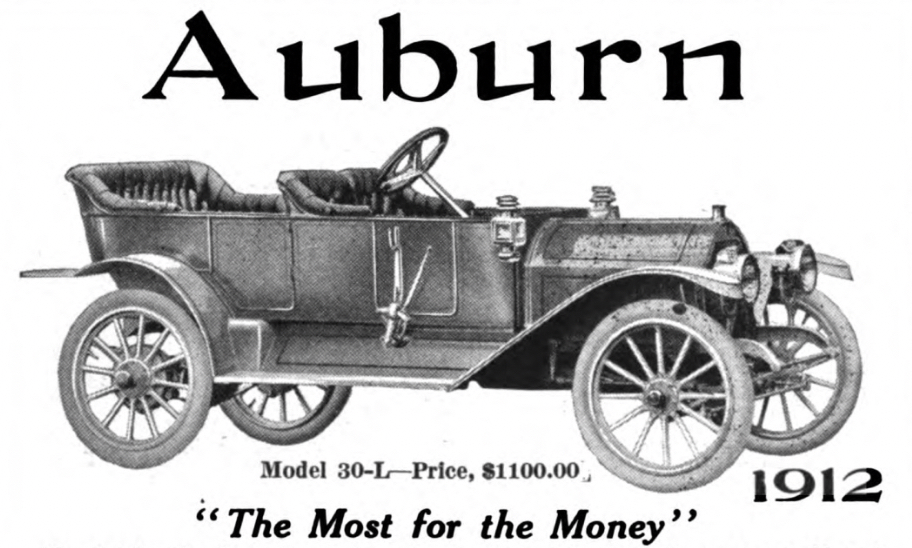
Auburn Model 30-L (1912)

The Auburn Automobile Company was an American manufacturer of automobiles from approximately 1903 to 1937, producing vehicles of the Auburn marque until 1936 and the Cord marque in the years 1929–1932 and 1936–1937. Headquartered in Auburn, Indiana, United States, the company was founded by brothers Frank and Morris Eckhart of the Eckhart Carriage Company. It was run with modest success until 1919 when the brothers sold its controlling interest to a group of Chicago businessmen, who in time hired automobile salesman Errett Lobban Cord. Cord soon took control of Auburn and increased production dramatically until the early 1930s, when sales began to decline. In August 1937, Cord sold his holdings of the company, and the Auburn and Cord marques (as well as that of sister company Duesenberg) were discontinued.

The Auburn company is well remembered for its Auburn-branded Speedster variants of 1928-36 and the Cord-branded L-29 and 810/812 models. Some of these models have been reproduced as revivals or replicas by various makers over subsequent decades.

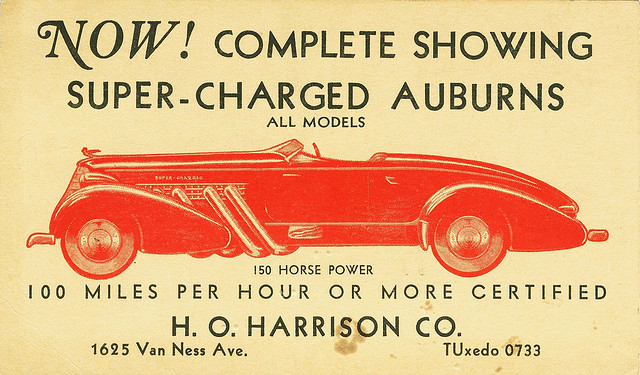
1935 Auburn Speedster ad

After a 1940 bankruptcy reorganization, the former Auburn Automobile Co. merged with the Central Manufacturing Company into Auburn Central Manufacturing (ACM) Corporation, which received large amounts of World War II production work, so much so, that in 1943, they rebranded ACM as American Central Manufacturing. One of their most notable WW II contributions involved manufacturing the bodies of at least three-quarters, or about half a million, of the World War II Willys and Ford 1/4‑ton jeeps.

== History ==
The Auburn Automobile Company grew out of the Eckhart Carriage Company, founded in Auburn, Indiana, in 1874 by Charles Eckhart (1841–1915). Eckhart's sons, Frank and Morris, experimented making automobiles before entering the business in earnest, absorbing two other local carmakers and moving into a larger plant in 1909. The enterprise was modestly successful until materials shortages during World War I forced the plant to close.

In 1919, the Eckhart brothers sold the company to a group of Chicago investors headed by Ralph Austin Bard, who later served as Assistant Secretary of the Navy for President Franklin Delano Roosevelt and as Undersecretary of the Navy for Roosevelt and President Harry S. Truman. The new owners revived the business, but it proved unprofitable. In 1924 they approached Errett Lobban Cord (1894–1974), a highly successful automobile salesman, with an offer to run the company. Cord countered with an offer to take over completely in what amounted to a leveraged buyout, which the Chicago group accepted. Cord aggressively marketed the company's unsold inventory and completed his buyout before the end of 1925.

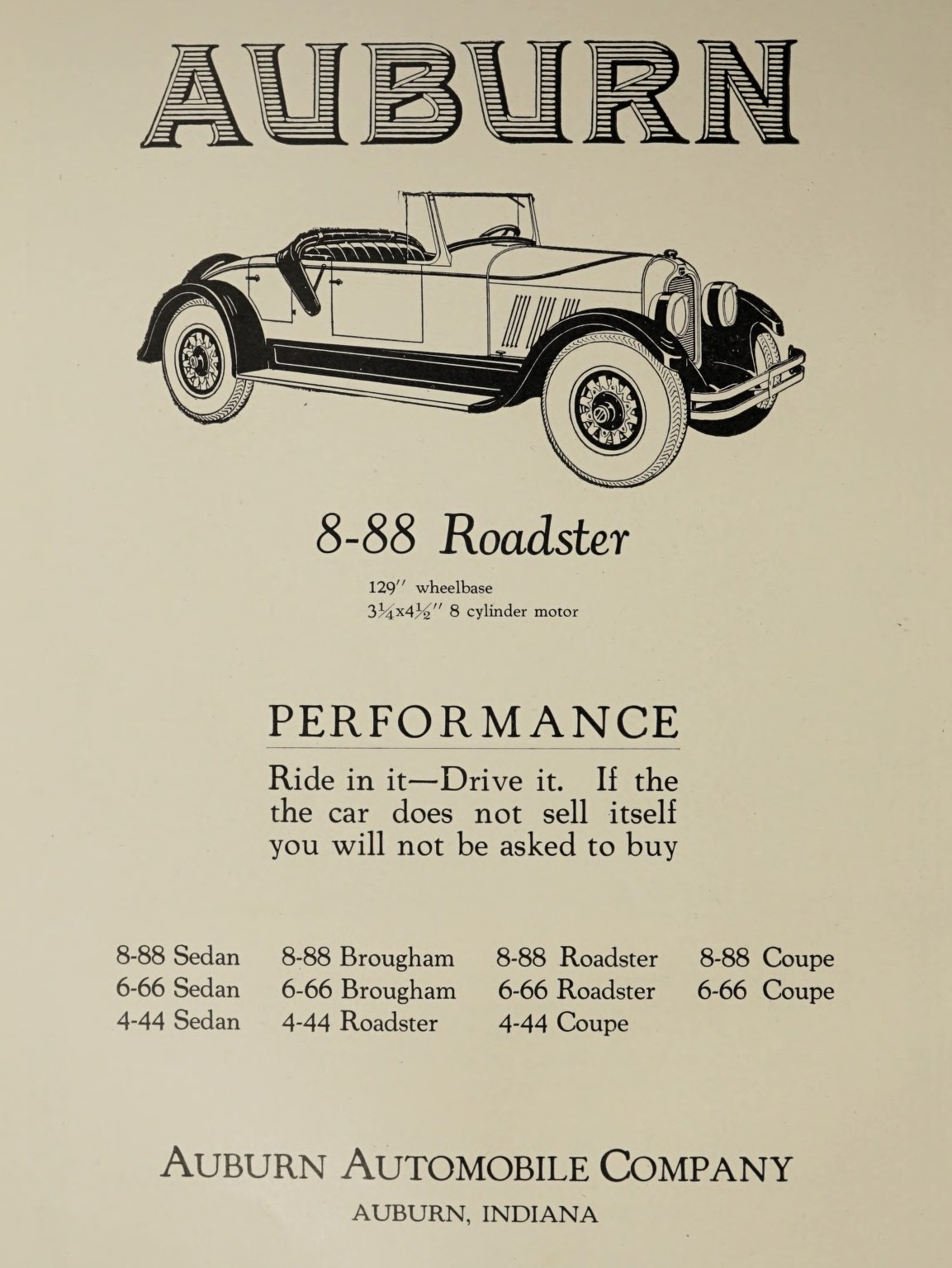
Auburn 8-88 Roadster advertisement in 1926

But after the 1929 stock market crash, despite advanced engineering and aggressive styling, Auburn's upscale vehicles were too expensive for the Depression-era market, and around 1935, Auburn started to produce a line of kitchen cabinets and sinks, to keep the company afloat.

Cord eventually gave up control of his automobile holding company, which included the even more expensive Cord, and Rolls-Royce-priced high-performance Duesenberg brands, as well as Central Manufacturing Co., an 1896 coach-building company that built metal bodies for a number of different car companies, including Auburn. Under injunction from the U.S. Securities and Exchange Commission to refrain from further violations, Cord sold his shares in his automobile holding company. In 1937, automotive production of all three marques ended.

In 1938, former Auburn Automobile Company executives purchased the remains of the Pak-Age-Car company, formed the Pak-Age-Car Corporation, and started building their delivery vehicles in the Connersville plant. In 1939, the sales and distribution rights were handed over to Diamond T; two years later the Pak-Age-Car was also discontinued with the switch to wartime production. After a 1940 bankruptcy reorganization, the former Auburn Automobile and Central Manufacturing Companies merged into Auburn Central Manufacturing / (ACM) Corporation.

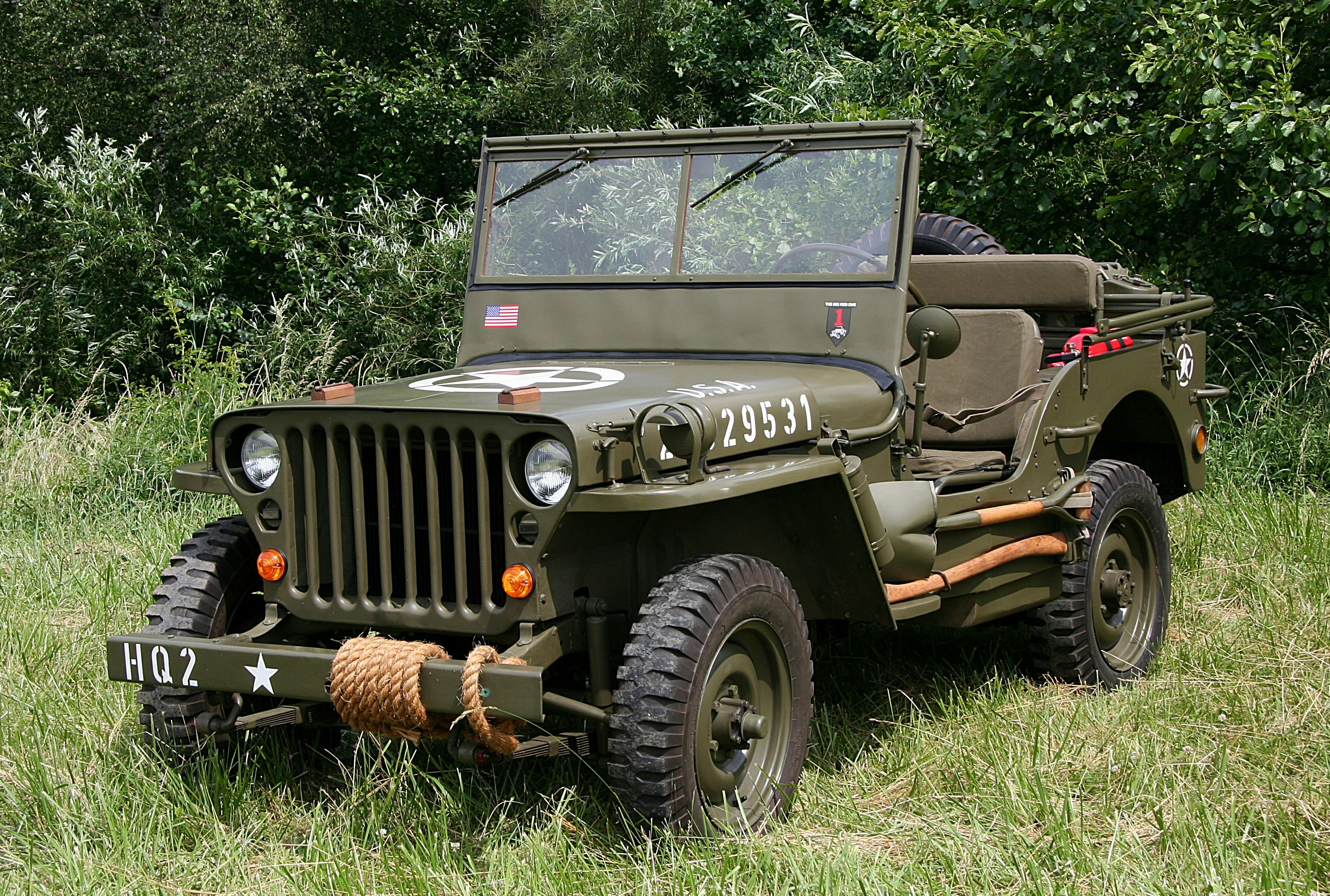
During World War II, and up to 1948, ACM (Auburn / American Central) Manufacturing made over half a million 1/4‑ton Jeep bodies.

In March 1941, Auburn Central Manufacturing (ACM) landed an important contract with Willys-Overland, initially for 1,600 Willys MA jeep bodies. The first bodies were shipped in April 1941, but more, very large, jeep body manufacturing contracts were gained from both Willys-Overland and Ford Motor Company during World War II. In addition to jeep bodies, ACM also made trailer bodies and aircraft components.

In March 1942, ACM changed its name from Auburn Central to American Central Manufacturing.

ACM then went on receiving orders from Willys-Overland for all body-tubs of their roughly 360,000 World War II 1/4‑ton, Willys MB jeeps, through 1945; plus roughly midway of their 280,000 or so 1/4‑ton GPW jeep production, Ford also ordered the remainder of their jeep body tubs from ACM as well !

By mid 1943, during peak wartime production, and having built their 150,000th jeep body, the Connersville, Indiana, company, and ACM's large buildings complex, together with many more automotive industries there, had formed a veritable industrial park, that earned the town the nickname "Little Detroit". Eventually, Jeep body production for Willys continued through 1948.

Post-war, in 1945, kitchen sinks, appliances, and cabinets were chosen as having the largest market potential for ACM's manufacturing capabilities. This indeed became ACM's core product after the war.

== Models ==
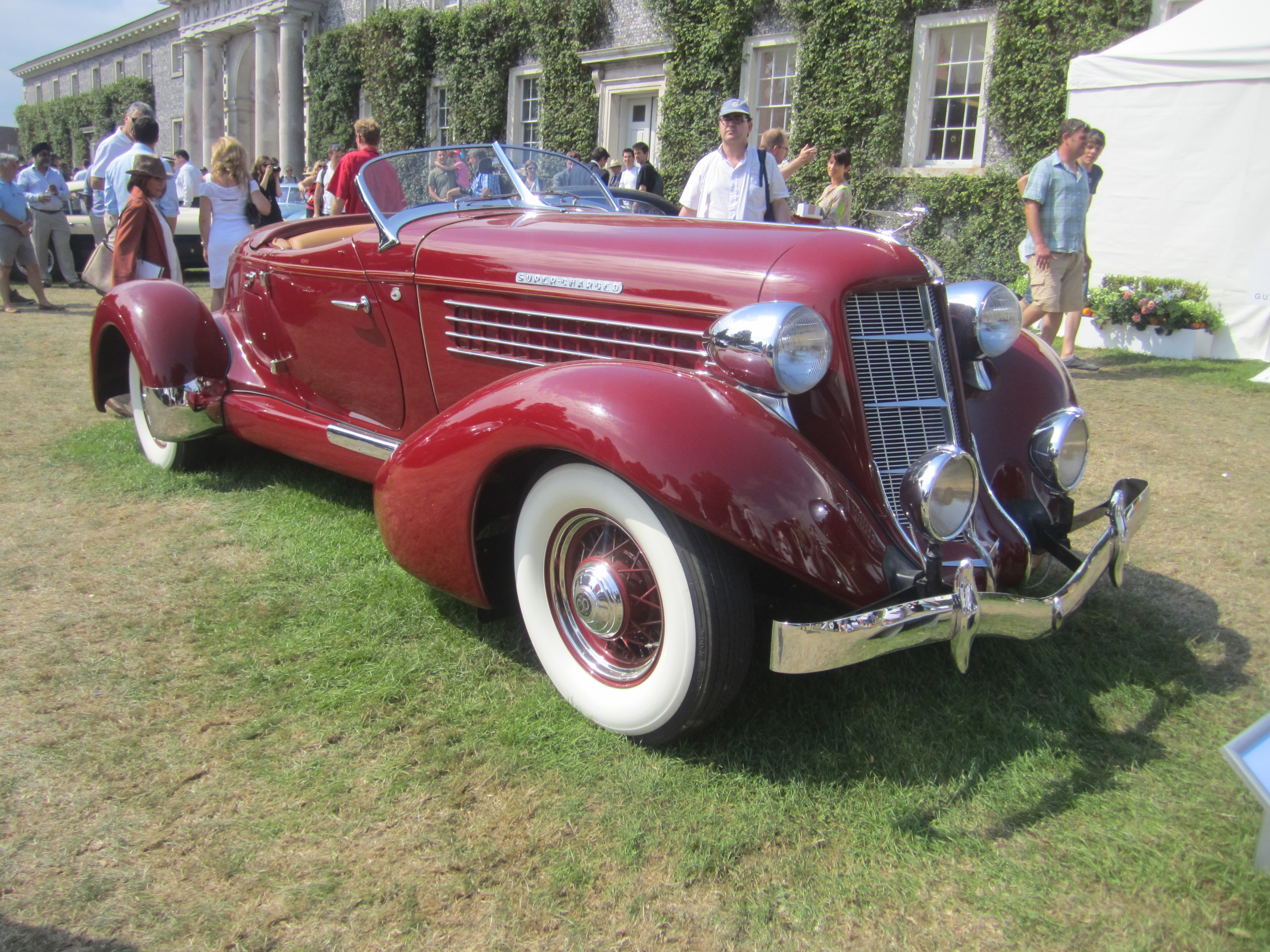
Auburn's Speedsters (shown a 1935 model 851), became one of Auburn's most legendary contributions to automotive history.

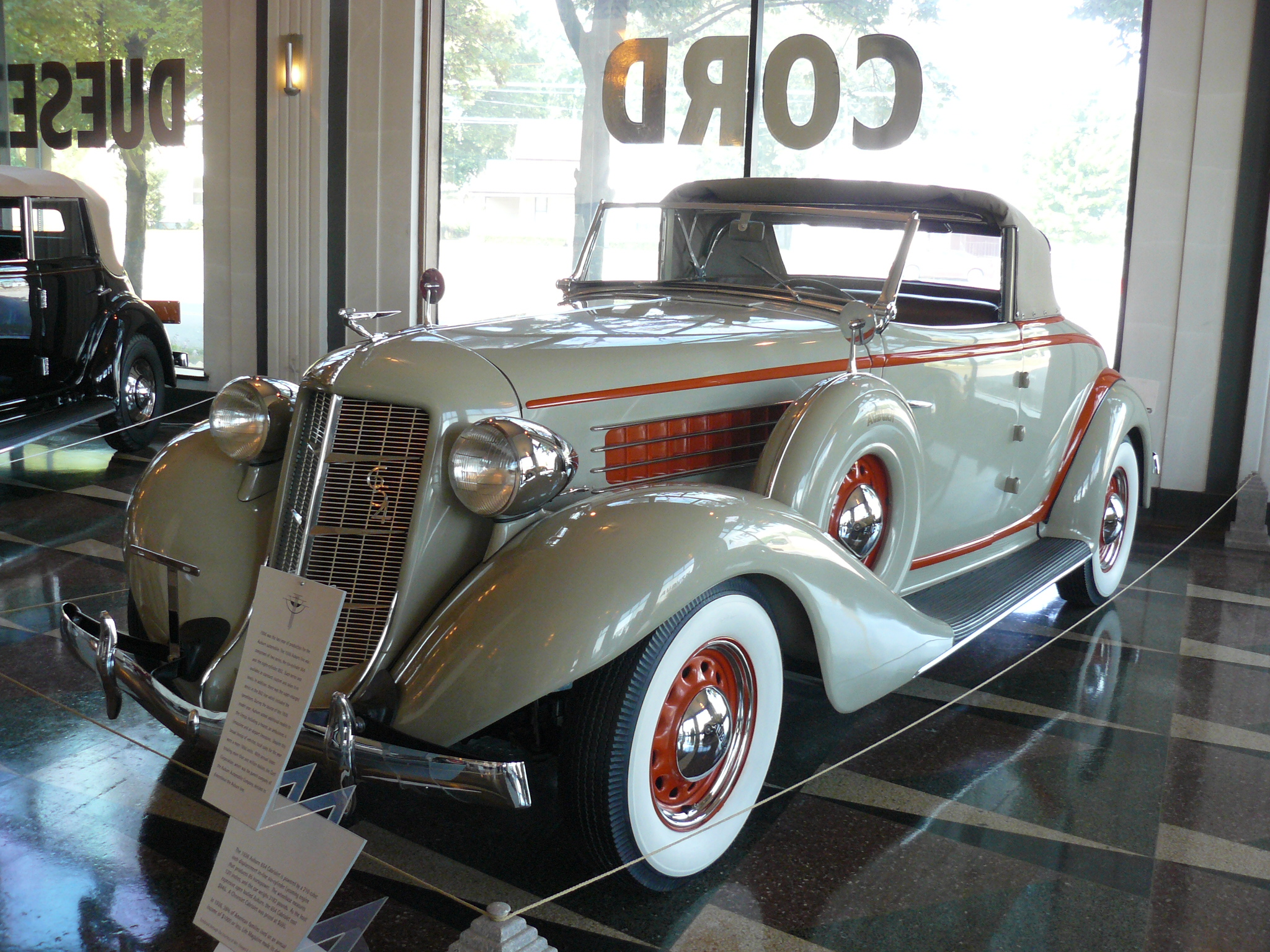
1936 Auburn 654 Cabriolet

The 1904 Auburn was a touring car model. Equipped with a tonneau, it could seat two or four passengers and sold for US$1,000, ($35,833 in 2025 dollars). The flat-mounted single-cylinder engine, situated at the center of the car, produced 10 hp (7.5 kW). A two-speed planetary transmission was fitted. The angle-steel-framed car weighed 1,500 lb (680 kg) and used half-elliptic springs.

In 1926, Errett Cord, then the owner of Auburn, partnered with Duesenberg Corporation, famous for its racing cars, and used it as the launching platform for a line of high-priced luxury vehicles, the Duesenberg Model J, produced between 1928 and 1937. He also put his own name on one of the first front-wheel-drive cars, Cord, known as the Cord L-29, produced between 1929 and 1937.

The company employed imaginative designers such as Alan Leamy, chief designer of the 1933 Auburn Speedster, and Gordon Buehrig, designer of the 810/812 Cords. Buehrig joined the company in Indianapolis in 1926 with Duesenberg Motors, and is credited with styling roughly half of the Model Js produced. Duesenberg built the chassis while the bodies were built either to Duesenberg's own specifications, or to the special order of the buyer, by selected independent body companies.

In 1934, Buehrig was transferred to Auburn Auto where he designed the 1935 Auburn 851 Speedster. The Speedster was styled or modified to use leftover speedster bodies. Buehrig and a design team were then assigned to E.L. Cord's so-called "Baby Duesenberg" to build a smaller, more affordable car. Designed by Buehrig in 1933, it became the acclaimed 1936/37 Cord 810/ 812 Cords, a hit at the November 1935 annual New York Automobile Show—acclaimed for advanced engineering as well as revolutionary styling. His design work completed, he left the company in 1937. and modified the four-door, Cord built cars such as the Duesenberg Model J (1928–37), the Auburn Speedster (1935–37), and the Cord 810/812 (1936–37) that became famous for their advanced engineering as well as their striking appearance. The Auburn Boattail Speedster was powered by a 4.6L straight eight that, with the popular supercharger option (150 hp), could top 100 mph (160 km/h) making it a popular model in the Hollywood market.

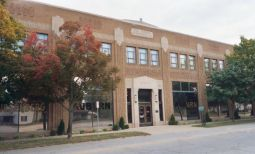
The Auburn Cord Duesenberg plant in Auburn, Indiana, today the Auburn Cord Duesenberg Automobile Museum

The Depression, coupled with Cord's stock manipulations, spelled the end of the company and production ceased in 1937. The company's art deco headquarters in Auburn now houses the Auburn Cord Duesenberg Automobile Museum and became a National Historic Landmark in 2005. The Auburn Automobile Company also had a manufacturing plant in Connersville, Indiana, formerly owned by the Lexington Motor Company.

== Auburn production specifications ==
- Auburn 8-Eighty-Eight Sedan
- Auburn 8-77
- Auburn 12
  - Auburn 12 speedster

== See also ==
- List of defunct United States automobile manufacturers
