= Auburn 8-Eighty-Eight Sedan =

Automobile manufactured by Auburn

The Auburn 8-Eighty-Eight sedan is an automobile that was manufactured by Auburn of Auburn, Indiana.

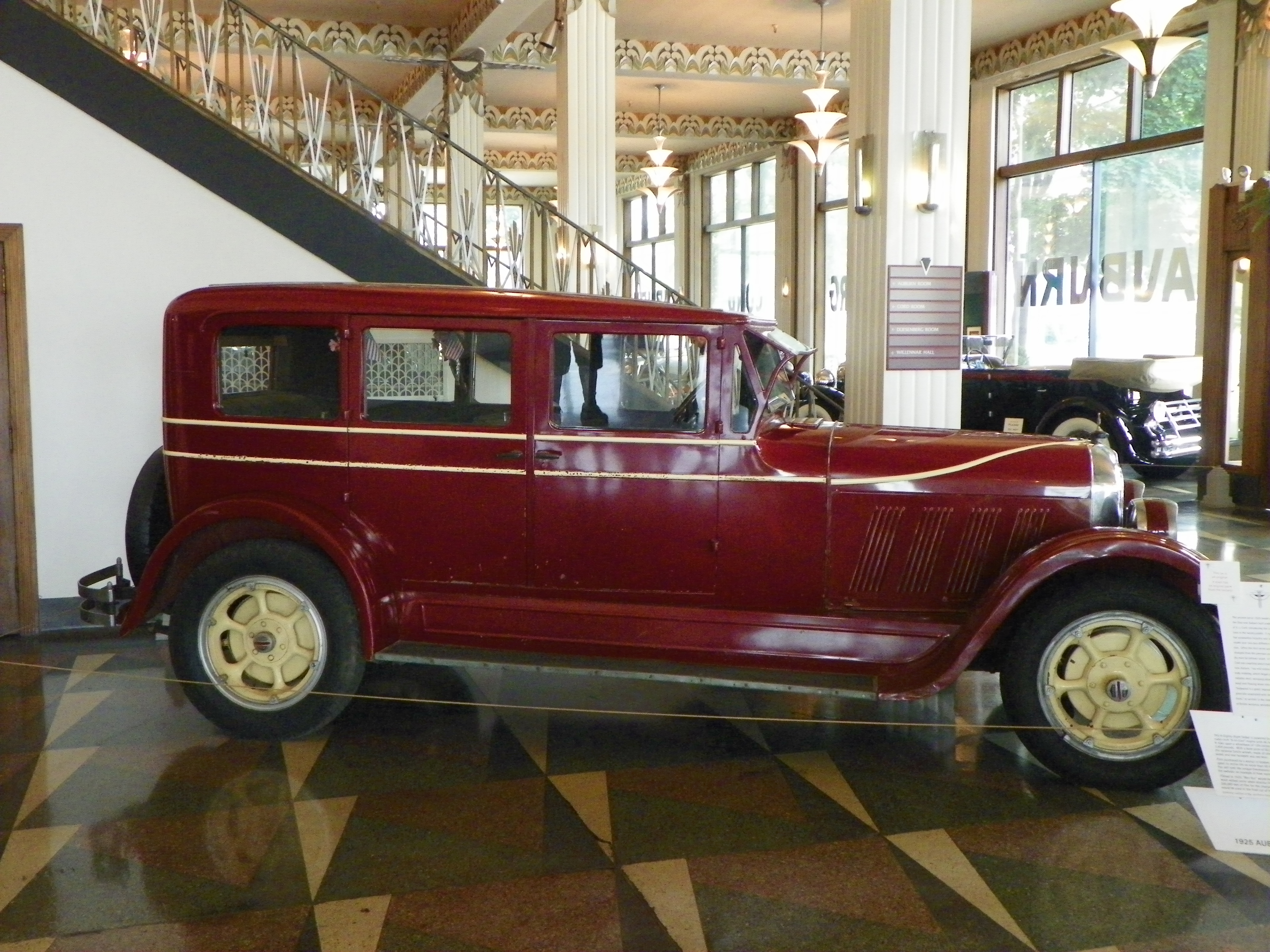
1925 8-Eighty-Eight sedan

== Auburn 8-Eighty-Eight Sedan specifications (1926 data) ==
- Color – Blue or moleskin two-tone lacquer
- Seating Capacity – Five
- Wheelbase – 129 inches = 3276 mm
- Wheels – Wood wheels standard
- Tires – 30” x 5.77” balloon
- Service Brakes – Contracting on rear wheels; expanding on front wheels
- Emergency Brakes – Contracting on propeller shaft
- Engine – Eight-cylinder, vertical, cast en bloc, 3-1/8 x 4-1/4 inches; head removable; valves inside; H.P. 31.25, N.A.C.C. rating
- Lubrication – Full force feed – regulated to opening and closing of throttle, not by speed of motor
- Crankshaft – Five bearing
- Radiator – Cellular
- Cooling – Water pump
- Ignition – Storage battery
- Starting System – Two Unit
- Voltage – Six
- Wiring System – Single
- Gasoline System – Vacuum
- Clutch – Long clutch
- Transmission – Selective sliding
- Gear Changes – 3 forward, 1 reverse
- Drive – Spiral bevel
- Rear Springs – Semi-elliptic
- Rear Axle – Semi-floating
- Steering Gear – Cam and lever; variable ratio

=== Standard equipment ===
New car price included the following items:

- tools
- jack
- speedometer
- ammeter
- electric horn
- demountable rims
- cowl ventilator
- headlight dimmer
- closed cars have heater and dome light

=== Optional equipment ===
The following was available at an extra cost:

- Spoke wheels

=== Prices ===
New car prices were available F.O.B. factory plus tax on the following models:

- Five Passenger Sedan - $1795
- Five Passenger Four Door Brougham - $1595
- Six Passenger Roadster - $1495

== See also ==
- Auburn Automobile
