= Gordon Buehrig =

American automobile designer

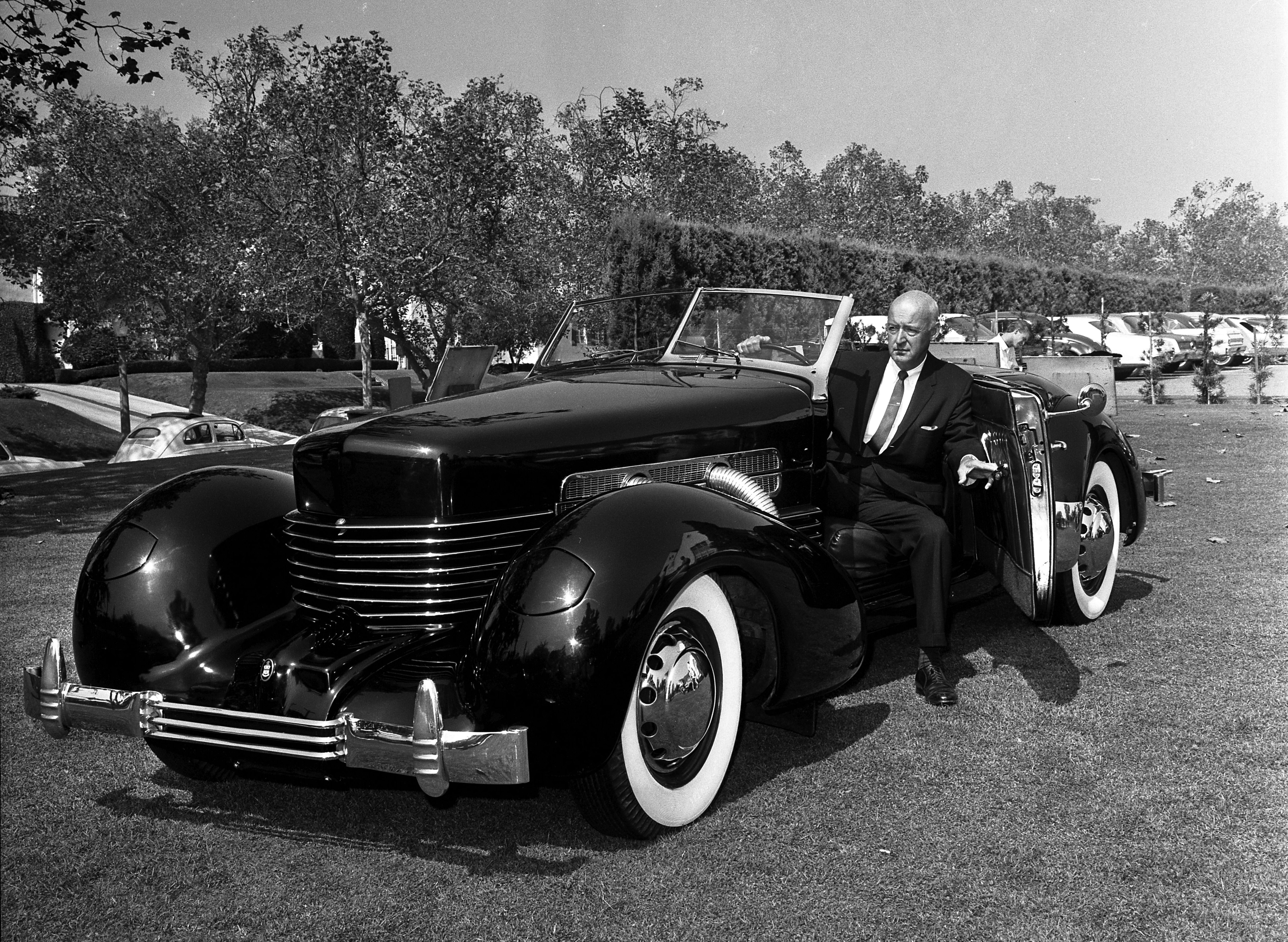
- Buehrig with a Cord 810, which he designed
- Born: Gordon Miller Buehrig; June 18, 1904; Mason City, Illinois
- Died: January 22, 1990 (aged 85); Grosse Pointe Woods, Michigan
- Occupation: automobile designer
- Spouses: Elizabeth ("Betty") Whitten (m. 1934; died 1970): Kathryn ("Kay") Lundell Benzin
- Children: 3

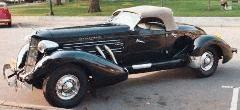
1935 Auburn Speedster designed by Gordon Buehrig

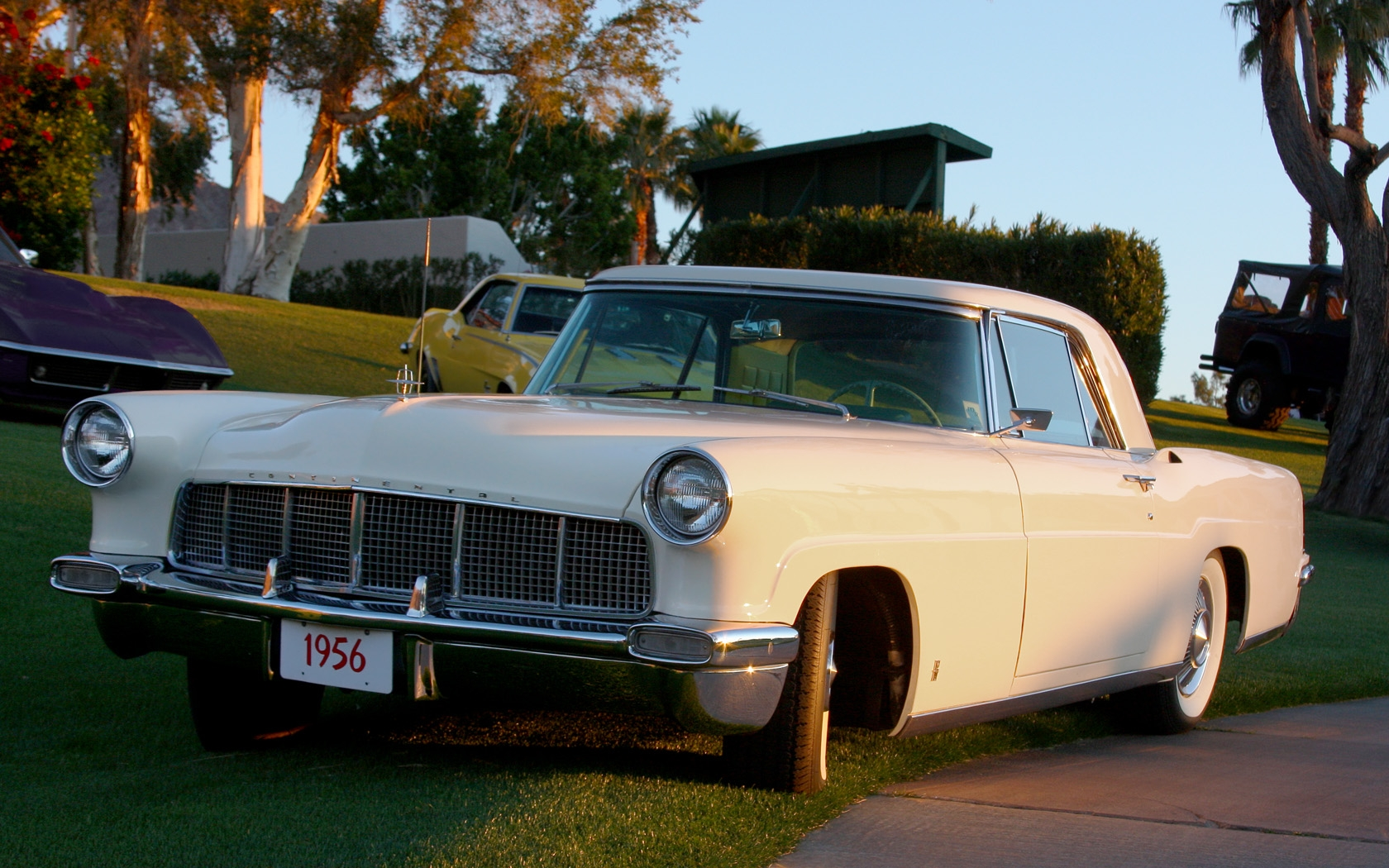
1956 Continental Mark II

Gordon Miller Buehrig (B-yur-rig) (June 18, 1904 – January 22, 1990) was an American automobile designer.

== Early life ==
Gordon Miller Buehrig was born in Mason City, Illinois, on June 18, 1904, to a banker. He attended Bradley University in Peoria, Illinois, but did not graduate.

== Career ==
After dropping out of Bradley University in 1924, he worked as a body shop apprentice in Wayne, Michigan.

He had early design experience with Packard, General Motors and Stutz. In 1929, he was responsible for designing the bodies (built by Weymann) of the Stutz Black Hawks entered at Le Mans. At age 25 he became chief body designer for Duesenberg, where he designed the Model J. He joined the Auburn Automobile Company of Auburn, Indiana, in 1934, producing the famous 1935 851 Boattail Speedster, based on the work of Alan Leamy. (A kit copy of this car was driven by the lead character in NBC's "Remington Steele".) He also designed the distinctive Cord 810/812, the latter recognized for its originality by the Museum of Modern Art in 1951. At the end of World War II, he worked with Studebaker and his design ideas led to their 1947 models.

In 1949, Buehrig joined Ford, where his projects included the 1951 Victoria Coupe, the 1952 station wagon, and the 1956 Continental Mark II. He invented the removable T-top, patented 5 June 1951, which was used in the aborted TASCO sports car.

Retiring from Ford in 1965, Buehrig taught from 1965 to 1970 at the Art Center College of Design in California. In 1979, he produced the design for the Buehrig motor car, a limited-production carriage roof coupe. In his last five years, he consulted for the Franklin Mint and helped oversee the development of their model cars.

== Personal life ==
Buehrig married Elizabeth "Betty" Whitten on December 23, 1934. Together, they had one daughter, Barbara. His wife died on August 28, 1970.

He later married Kathryn "Kay" Lundell. He also had two stepdaughters: Carol and Joanne.

== Death ==
Buehrig died at his home in Grosse Pointe Woods, Michigan, on January 22, 1990, at the age of 85. His cremated remains are buried in Roselawn Cemetery in Auburn, Indiana.

== Awards and legacy ==
Buehrig was honored by the Scarab Club in Detroit, an artists' club with a show of his work and asking him to sign the beam in the banquet hall. During that event he revealed that one of his favorite vehicles was the Duesenberg Twenty Grand, which was developed for the Chicago World's Fair of 1933 along with three other vehicles. Buehrig had read Le Corbusier's Toward an Architecture and was deeply inspired by it. Buehrig's work also led to front-wheel-drive Oldsmobile cars and also inspired a Chrysler vehicle with its hood design.

In 1981, he was included a list of the top 30 people who influenced automotive history by the Society of Automotive Historians.

His Twenty Grand Duesenberg design was selected to be exhibited in Essen, Germany as one of “The Ten Most Beautiful Cars in the World" and won Best of Show at the 1980 Pebble Beach Concours d'Elegance.

He was inducted into the Automotive Hall of Fame in October 1989.

He was one of 25 candidates for Car Designer of the Century, an international award given in 1999 to honor the most influential automobile designer of the 20th century. It was won by Giorgetto Giugiaro.
