= Errett Lobban Cord =

American businessman (1894–1974)

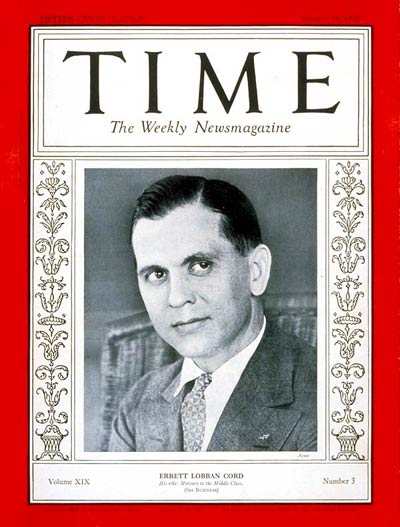
- Cord on the cover of Time magazine, January 18, 1932
- Born: July 20, 1894; Warrensburg, Missouri, U.S.
- Died: January 2, 1974 (aged 79); Reno, Nevada, U.S.
- Occupation: Business executive
- Known for: Founder of the Cord Corporation

Errett Lobban "E. L." Cord (July 20, 1894 – January 2, 1974) was an American business executive. He was considered a leader in United States transport during the early and middle 20th century.

Cord founded the Cord Corporation in 1929 as a holding company for over 150 companies he controlled, mostly in the field of transportation. The corporation controlled the Auburn Automobile Company, which built Auburn and Cord automobiles; Lycoming Engines; Duesenberg Inc.; New York Shipbuilding; Checker Motors; Stinson Aircraft Company; and American Airways (later American Airlines), amongst other holdings.

In 1932, Cord formed the Aircraft Development Corporation, which was instrumental in the development of Jerry Vultee's Vultee V-1.

== Biography ==
Born in Warrensburg, Missouri, Cord had been a race car driver, mechanic and car salesman before he was offered the opportunity to manage the dying Auburn Automobile Company in 1924. By 1928 he controlled Auburn, which by 1931 was the 13th largest seller of autos in the United States. During 1934, he moved to England, reportedly because of kidnapping threats. He moved back to the United States in 1936, but then came under investigation by the Securities and Exchange Commission for his dealings in Checker Cab stock.

In 1937 he sold the Cord Corporation to the Aviation Corporation and retired to Los Angeles to earn even more millions in real estate. The same year, Cord purchased the Pan-Pacific Auditorium, a major venue in Los Angeles for indoor events. He also owned several of the first radio and television stations in California and later Nevada, where he moved in the 1940s. In the call letters of his Los Angeles radio station, KFAC, the A.C. stands for Auburn Cord. In Reno, Cord established KCRL-TV and radio in the 1950s and operated it for more than 25 years. The 'CRL' in the station's call letters stood for "Circle L"—a ranch Cord owned in Lovelock, Nevada.

During the 1940s he filled in for a Nevada state legislator who died in the middle of his term and again rose to fame as a politician in his later life. In 1958 he was asked to run for governor of Nevada, but he refused and never explained why. He died in Reno, Nevada from cancer in 1974, aged 79.

== Legacy ==
Cord established The E.L. Cord Foundation on December 4, 1962. After his death a substantial portion of his estate went to the foundation.

The foundation established the E.L. Cord Museum School and funds several scholarships at the Nevada Museum of Art.

Other grants in the field of education include the E.L. Cord Student Success Center and The E.L. Cord Foundation Center for Learning and Literacy at the University of Nevada, scholarships at Truckee Meadows Community College, and a fellowship at Wichita State University.

A collection of Cord's autos is in Auburn, Indiana, (1600 South Wayne Street) at the Auburn Cord Duesenberg Automobile Museum.

== Popular culture ==
Gram Parsons wrote a song about Cord called "The New Soft Shoe" that appeared on his first solo release, titled GP.

== See also ==
- Century Airlines pilots' strike

Awards and achievements
Preceded by Daniel Willard	Cover of Time magazine January 18, 1932	Succeeded by Philip Barry
Preceded by Sir Arthur Eddington	Cover of Time magazine April 23, 1934	Succeeded by Robert L. Doughton
