= List of Auburn vehicles =

This is a list of vehicles of the Auburn marque produced by the Auburn Automobile Company between 1903 and 1936. Included are vehicles produced, beginning in 1900, by Frank and Morris Eckhart before they formally established Auburn in 1903. The company produced vehicles in Auburn and Connersville, Indiana.

== Auburn production numbers ==
Auburn began production with 8 automobiles in 1900. Production reached 4,044 in 1925 and peaked at 34,228 in 1931, but then declined drastically with only 1,263 vehicles produced in 1936. Sources list no vehicle production in Auburn's final year (1937).

- 1900: 8
- 1901: 25
- 1902: 72
- 1903: 120
- 1904: 144
- 1905: 160
- 1906: 189
- 1907: 197
- 1908: 356
- 1909: 1,018
- 1910: 1,365
- 1911: 954
- 1912: 1,605
- 1913: 1,554
- 1914: 1,094
- 1915: 2,113
- 1916: 2,686
- 1917: 2,307
- 1918: 1,374
- 1919: 6,062
- 1920: 5,034
- 1921: 3,306
- 1922: 2,408
- 1923: 2,443
- 1924: 2,474
- 1925: 4,044
- 1926: 7,138
- 1927: 14,515
- 1928: 12,899
- 1929: 23,509
- 1930: 12,985
- 1931: 34,228
- 1932: 11,145
- 1933: 5,038
- 1934: 7,770
- 1935: 6,316
- 1936: 1,263
- 1937: 0

(total): 179,918

== Engines ==
The first Auburn vehicles were equipped with single-cylinder engines. Beginning in 1905, 2 cylinders were offered; then 4 cylinders in 1909; 6 cylinders in 1912; 8 cylinders in 1925; and finally 12 cylinders in 1932. Auburn also added a supercharged 8-cylinder engine during the last two years of production. Auburn sourced engines from various companies. During its first two decades, Auburn used Rutenber, Teetor, and Continental engines. In 1923, Auburn used Continental engines for the 6-43 and Weidely engines for the 6-63. In 1925 and later years, Auburn used engines by Lycoming.

== Model numbers, names, and packages ==
Auburn model numbers started out with basic numbering and lettering schemes. A two-part numbering scheme was phased in beginning in 1912 (with the model 6-50). In this scheme, the first number referred to the number of cylinders and the second number (often imprecisely) referred to the engine's horsepower: the model 6-50 of 1912 had 6 cylinders and offered 50 horsepower, and the model 4-38 of 1917 had 4 cylinders and 38 horsepower. However, these designations were not strictly followed. For example, model 6-80 of 1929 had a 6-cylinder engine but only offered 65 horsepower, and the model 12-165 of 1933 had 12 cylinders and offered 160 horsepower, etc.

Model numbers sometimes vary between references and vehicle literature, such as "Model 120" vs. "8-120" for the same 1929 vehicle, or "Model 653" vs. "6-653" for the same 1935 vehicle. The list below follows the two-part numbering system for consistency after it was phased in (circa 1912), noting alternate designations if known.

Auburn occasionally used model names, such as the "Union" of 1916-17 and the "Beauty Six" of 1919–22. From the year 1931, packages such as Standard, Custom, Salon, Custom Dual Ratio, Salon Dual Ratio, and Supercharged Dual Ratio were designated, in addition to model numbers and body styles.

== List of vehicles ==
This list is chronologically sorted year over year, but can be re-sorted to search for specific model numbers. See also the "model number cross-reference" below. The list includes wheelbase in inches, number of cylinders, horsepower, engine type and size in cubic inches (sometimes specifying carburetor barrels), body styles offered in that year (at that wheelbase), and other information if available.

Image	Year	Model	Wb	Cyl	Hp; Engine	Body Style(s)	Vehicle Information
	1900	Runabout		1		(Runabout)	First year of production. Only 8 produced.
	1901	Runabout		1		(Runabout)	25 produced.
	1902	Runabout	78in	1	6; L1 85.4ci	(Runabout)	2-seater.
	1903	Runabout	78in	1	6; L1 85.4ci	(Runabout)	2-seater.
	1903	A Tonneau	78in	1	6; L1 85.4ci	(Tonneau)	4-seater.
	1903	A Touring	78in	1	6; L1 85.4ci	(Touring)	
	1904	Runabout	78in	1	10; L1 142.5ci	(Runabout)	2-seater.
	1904	A Tonneau	78in	1	10; L1 142.5ci	(Tonneau)	4-seater.
	1904	A Touring	78in	1	10; L1 142.5ci	(Touring)	
	1905	B Touring	92in	2	18; L2 196.3ci	(Touring)	1905 was the first year for the 2-cylinder engine.
	1906	C Touring	94in	2	20–24; L2 196.3ci	(Touring)	
	1907	D Touring	100in	2	24; L2 216.5ci	(Touring)	
	1907	E Touring	100in	2	24; L2 216.5ci	(Close-coupled Touring)	Not listed in the Standard Catalog of American Cars (SCAC).
	1907	F Roadster	100in	2	24; L2 216.5ci	(Roadster)	2-seater. The SCAC does not list a model F for 1907, but it does list one for 1911.
	1908	G Touring	100in	2	24; L2 216.5ci	(Touring)	The model G ran from 1908 to 1911.
	1908	H Touring	100in	2	24; L2 216.5ci	(Close-coupled Touring)	The model H ran from 1908 to 1910.
	1908	K Roadster	100in	2	24; L2 216.5ci	(Roadster)	2-seater. The model K ran from 1908 to 1911. The SCAC lists this as a Runabout, not a Roadster.
	1909	G Touring	100in	2	24; L2 216.5ci	(Touring)	The model G ran from 1908 to 1911.
	1909	H Touring	100in	2	24; L2 216.5ci	(Close-coupled Touring)	The model H ran from 1908 to 1910.
	1909	K Roadster	100in	2	24; L2 216.5ci	(Roadster)	2-seater. The model K ran from 1908 to 1911. The SCAC lists this as a Runabout, not a Roadster.
	1909	B Touring	106in	4	25–30; L4 201.1ci	(Touring)	1909 was the first year for the 4-cylinder engine. (See also B Touring of 1906, which had fewer cylinders and shorter wheelbase.) The B Touring with 106in wheelbase ran from 1909 to 1910.
	1909	C Touring	106in	4	25–30; L4 201.1ci	(Close-coupled Touring)	The C Touring with 106in wheelbase ran from 1909 to 1910.
	1909	D Roadster	106in	4	25–30; L4 201.1ci	(Roadster)	2-seater. The D Roadster with 106in wheelbase ran from 1909 to 1910. The SCAC lists this as a Runabout, not a Roadster. See also D Roadster of 1911 with longer wheelbase.
	1910	G Touring	100in	2	24; L2 216.5ci	(Touring)	The model G ran from 1908 to 1911.
	1910	H Touring	100in	2	24; L2 216.5ci	(Close-coupled Touring)	The model H ran from 1908 to 1910.
	1910	K Roadster	100in	2	24; L2 216.5ci	(Roadster)	2-seater. The model K ran from 1908 to 1911. The SCAC lists this as a Runabout, not a Roadster.
	1910	B Touring	106in	4	25–30; L4 201.1ci	(Touring)	(See also B Touring of 1906, which had fewer cylinders and shorter wheelbase.) The B Touring with 106in wheelbase ran from 1909 to 1910.
	1910	C Touring	106in	4	25–30; L4 201.1ci	(Close-coupled Touring)	The C Touring with 106in wheelbase ran from 1909 to 1910.
	1910	D Roadster	106in	4	25–30; L4 201.1ci	(Roadster)	2-seater. The D Roadster with 106in wheelbase ran from 1909 to 1910. The SCAC lists this as a Runabout, not a Roadster. See also D Roadster of 1911 with longer wheelbase.
	1910	R Touring	116in	4	35–40; L4 318.1ci	(Close-coupled Touring)	
	1910	S Roadster	116in	4	35–40; L4 318.1ci	(Roadster)	2-seater.
	1910	X Touring	116in	4	35–40; L4 318.1ci	(Touring)	
	1911	G Touring	100in	2	24; L2 216.5ci	(Touring)	The model G ran from 1908 to 1911.
	1911	K Roadster	100in	2	24; L2 216.5ci	(Roadster)	2-seater. The model K ran from 1908 to 1911. The SCAC lists this as a Runabout, not a Roadster.
	1911	D Roadster	112in	4	25–30; L4 201.1ci	(Roadster)	2-seater.
	1911	F Touring	112in	4	25–30; L4 201.1ci	(Close-coupled Touring)	
	1911	L Touring	112in	4	25–30; L4 201.1ci	(Touring)	
	1911	M Roadster	120in	4	35–40; L4 318.1ci	(Roadster)	2-seater.
	1911	N Touring	120in	4	35–40; L4 318.1ci	(Touring)	
	1911	T Touring	120in	4	35–40; L4 318.1ci	(Touring)	
	1911	Y Touring	120in	4	35–40; L4 318.1ci	(Touring)	
	1912	30L	112in	4	30; L4 201.1ci	Roadster, Touring	
	1912	35L	115in	4	35; L4 280.6ci	Roadster	The SCAC lists only a Touring option for 35L (at 30 hp).
	1912	40H	120in	4	40; 318.1ci	Touring	The SCAC rates the engine in 40H, 40M, and 40N as 35-40 hp.
	1912	40M	120in	4	40; 318.1ci	Roadster	2-seater. The SCAC rates the engine in 40H, 40M, and 40N as 35-40 hp.
	1912	40N	120in	4	40; 318.1ci	Close-coupled Touring	The SCAC rates the engine in 40H, 40M, and 40N as 35-40 hp.
	1912	6-50	135in	6	50; L6 420.9ci	Touring	1912 was the first year for the 6-cylinder engine. The two-part numbering scheme was also introduced with the 6-50. Sources vary between model "50" and "6-50" in years 1912–13.
	1913	33L	112in	4	33; L4 231.9ci	Touring	An early brochure refers to this as a model "30-33-L", as the motor was at one time rated 30-33 horsepower.
	1913	33M	112in	4	33; L4 231.9ci	Roadster	An early brochure refers to this as a model "30-33-M", as the motor was at one time rated 30-33 horsepower.
	1913	37L	115in	4	37; L4 269.4ci	Touring	The SCAC does not list the model 37L. Caaarguide.com lists it as found here (37 hp, 115 inches). A brochure from circa 1912/1913 lists the 115-inch model as the "35-L"—a continuation of the 1912 model name.
	1913	40	122in	4	40; L4 318.1ci	Town Car	The SCAC does not list the model 40 for 1918. It does, however, list the 4-40 for 1914 (Coupe, Roadster, Touring).
	1913	40A	122in	4	40; L4 318.1ci	Roadster	
	1913	40L	122in	4	40; L4 318.1ci	Touring	
	1913	6-45	130in	6	45; L6 347.9ci	Touring	The SCAC designates this as model 45 in the same body style (Touring).
	1913	6-45	130in	6	45; L6 347.9ci	Coupe, Roadster, Town Car	The SCAC designates this as model 45B in the same 3 body styles.
	1913	6-50	135in	6	50; L6 420.9ci	Touring	Sources vary between model "50" and "6-50" in years 1912–13.
	1914	4-40	120in	4	40; L4 318.1ci	Coupe, Roadster, Touring	
	1914	4-41	120in	4	40; L4 318.1ci	Touring	
	1914	6-45	130in	6	45; L6 347.9ci	Roadster, Touring	
	1914	6-46	130in	6	45; L6 347.9ci	Touring	
	1915	4-36	114in	4	36; L4 220.9ci	Roadster, Touring	The SCAC lists the 4-36 (Roadster, Touring) in years 1915 and 1917.
	1915	4-43	120in	4	43; L4 349.9ci	Roadster, Touring	
	1915	6-40	126in	6	40; L6 288.6ci	Roadster, Touring	Sources vary: the SCAC lists 3 body styles for model 6-40 in this year (Coupe, Roadster, Touring) with a hp rating of 50.
	1915	6-47	135in	6	47, L6 347.9ci	Roadster, Touring	Sources vary: Caaarguide.com only lists a Touring body style for the model 6-47.
	1916	4-36 Union	114in	4	36; L4 220.9ci	4dr Touring 5P	The SCAC does not list the model 4-36 for year 1916, but it lists the model for 1915 and 1917.
	1916	4-38	114in	4	38; L4 235.86ci	2dr Roadster 2P, 4dr Touring 5P	
	1916	6-38	120in	6	40; L6 212.6ci	2dr Roadster 2P, 4dr Touring 5P	
	1916	6-40	127in	6	40; L6 288.6ci	2dr Roadster 2P, 4dr Touring 7P	
	1917	4-34 Union	114in	4	34; L4 220.9ci	2dr Roadster 2P, 4dr Touring 5P	Caaarguide.com lists the 4-34 Union and the 4-38 for 1917 4-cylinder models, but not the 4-36. The SCAC lists only the 4-36 for 4-cylinder models.
	1917	4-36	114in?	4	36; ?	2dr Roadster 2P, 4dr Touring 5P	Caaarguide.com lists the 4-34 Union and the 4-38 for 1917 4-cylinder models, but not the 4-36. The SCAC lists only the 4-36 for 4-cylinder models.
	1917	4-38	114in	4	38; L4 235.86ci	2dr Roadster 2P, 4dr Touring 5P	Caaarguide.com lists the 4-34 Union and the 4-38 for 1917 4-cylinder models, but not the 4-36. The SCAC lists only the 4-36 for 4-cylinder models.
	1917	6-39	120in	6	39; L6 230ci	2dr Chummy Roadster 2/4P, 2dr Roadster 2P, 4dr Touring	The SCAC only lists Roadster and Touring body styles for model 6-39.
	1917	6-44	131in	6	44; L6 303.1ci	2dr Roadster 2P, 4dr Touring 7P	
	1918	6-39	120in	6	43; L6 224ci	2dr Chummy Roadster 2/4P, 2dr Roadster 2P, 4dr Sport Touring 5P, 4dr Touring 7P	The SCAC only lists 3 body styles (Roadster, Touring, Sport Touring) for model 6-39 for 1918.
	1918	6-44	131in	6	44; L6 303.1ci	2dr Chummy Roadster 2/4P, 4dr Sedan 7P, 4dr Sport Touring 5P, 4dr Touring 7P	
	1919	6-39 Beauty Six	120in	6	43; L6 224ci	2dr Coupe 4P, 2dr Roadster 2P, 4dr Sedan 5P, 4dr Touring 5P, 4dr Tourster 4P	The SCAC only lists 4 body styles (Coupe, Roadster, Sedan, Touring) for model 6-39 for 1919.
	1920	6-39 Beauty Six	120in	6	43; L6 224ci	2dr Coupe 4P, 2dr Roadster 2P, 4dr Sedan 5P, 4dr Touring 5P, 4dr Tourster 4P	The Note: SCAC lists 5 body styles (Coupe, Roadster, Sedan, Sport Touring, Touring) for model 6-39 for 1920.
	1921	6-39 Beauty Six	120in	6	55; L6 224ci	2dr Cabriolet, 2dr Coupe 4P, 2dr Roadster 2P, 4dr Sedan 5P, 4dr Touring 5P, 4dr Tourster 4P	
	1922	6-51 Beauty Six	121in	6	55; L6 224ci	2dr coupe 4P, Roadster 2P, 4dr Sedan 5P, 4dr Sport Touring 4P, 4dr Touring 5P, 4dr Touring 7P	The SCAC lists 5 body styles (Coupe, Roadster, Sedan, Sport Touring, Touring) for model 6-51 for 1922.
	1923	6-43	114in	6	50; L6 195 .5ci	4dr Sedan 5P, 4dr Touring 5P	
	1923	6-51	121in	6	55; L6 224ci 1b	4dr Brougham 4P, 4dr Phaeton, 4dr Sedan 5P, 4dr touring 5P, 4dr Tourster 4P	(What Caaarguide.com website calls "Tourster", the SCAC seems to call "Sport Touring".)
	1923	6-63	122in	6	63; L6 248ci 1b	4dr Brougham 4P, 4dr Sedan 5P, 4dr Touring 5P, 4dr Tourster 4P	
	1924	6-43	114in	6	50; L6 195.5ci 1b	2dr Coupe 4P, 2dr Sedan 5P, 4dr Sedan 5P, 4dr Touring 5P, 4dr Tourster 4P	Also advertised as Torpedo 5P, Sport 5P, Touring Coupe, and Sedan 5P.
	1924	6-63	122in	6	63; L6 248ci 1b	4dr Brougham 4P, 4dr Sedan 5P, 4dr Touring 5P, 4dr Tourster 4P	Also advertised as Torpedo 5P, Sport 5P, and Sedan 7P.
	1925	6-43	114in	6	50; L6 195.5ci 1b	2dr Coupe 4P, 4dr Phaeton 5P, 4dr Sport Phaeton 4P, 2dr Sedan 5P, 4dr Sedan 5P	
	1925	6-66	121in	6	55; L6 224ci 1b	4dr Brougham 4P, 2dr Roadster 2P, 4dr Sedan 5P, 4dr Touring 5P	
	1925	8-63	124in	8	78; L8 276.1ci 1b	4dr Brougham 4P, 4dr Sedan 5P, 4dr Touring 5P	The SCAC erroneously lists this as model 8-36. Also, it lists the Brougham body style as 2dr, not 4dr. 1925 was the first year for the 8-cylinder engine.
	1925	8-88	129in	8	78; L8 276.1ci 1b	4dr Brougham 4P, 2dr Roadster 2P, 4dr Sedan 5P, 4dr Sedan 7P, 4dr Touring 5P	Available 1925–29. Also called 8-Eighty-Eight.
	1926	4-44	120in	4	42; L4 206.4ci 1b	4dr Coupe 3P, 2dr Roadster 2P, 4dr Sedan 5P, Touring	Caaarguide.com does not list the Touring body style for the 4-44.
	1926	6-66	121in	6	48; L6 224ci 1b	4dr Brougham 5P, 4dr Coupe 3P, 2dr Roadster 2P, 4dr Sedan 5P, Touring	Caaarguide.com does not list the Touring body style for the 6-66 for 1926.
	1926	8-88	129in	8	88; L8 298.6 ci 1b	4dr Brougham 5P, 2dr Coupe 5P, 2dr Roadster 2P, 4dr Sedan 5P, 4dr Sedan 7P, 4dr Touring 5P	
	1926	8-88	146in	8	88; L8 298.6 ci 1b		The SCAC calls this body style a sedan 7P. Note different number of passengers.
	1927	6-66	121in	6	48; L6 224ci 1b	2dr Brougham 4P, 2dr Roadster 2P, 4dr Sedan 5P, 4dr Wanderer Sedan 5P	The SCAC calls these four body style offerings Brougham, Roadster, Sedan, and Touring.
	1927	8-77	125in	8	77; L8 225.7ci 1b	2dr Roadster 2P, 4dr Sedan 5P, 4dr Sport Sedan 5P, 4dr Wanderer Sedan 5P	The SCAC lists Brougham, Roadster, Sedan, and Touring for the model 8-77 in 1927.
	1927	8-88	129in	8	88; L8 298.6 ci 1b	SCAC: Brougham, Coupe, Roadster, Sedan, Sports Sedan, Touring	
	1927	8-88	146in	8	88; L8 298.6 ci 1b	Sedan 7P, Touring	Caaarguide.com only lists one body style for the 146in wb: 4dr Sedan 7P.
	1928	6-76	120in	6	65; L6 185ci 1b	2dr Cabriolet 4P, 2dr Roadster 2/4P, 4dr Sedan 5P, 4dr Sport Sedan 5P	The SCAC gives this model as 6-66. However, in its Second Series listing, the SCAC refers to the same four six-cylinder body styles as "Model 76".
	1928	8-77	?	8	77	Cabriolet, Roadster, Sedan, Sport Sedan	Caaarguide.com does not list a model 8-77 at all for 1928.
	1928	8-88	125in	8	88; L8 246.6ci 1b	2dr Cabriolet 4P, 2dr Roadster 2/4P, 4dr Phaeton Sedan 5p, 4dr Sedan 5P, 4dr Sport Sedan 5P, 2dr Speedster 2P	The SCAC only lists five body styles for model 8-88 in 1928 (Cabriolet, Roadster, Sedan, Sport Sedan, Touring). However, its Second Series listing for model 88 includes six body styles (Cabriolet, Phaeton, Roadster, Sedan, Speedster, Sport Sedan).
	1928	8-88	136in	8	88	Sedan 7P	Caaarguide.com does not list an 8-88 model with a 136in wb for 1928. The SCAC lists one body style for 136in (sedan 7P).
	1928	8-115	130in	8	115; L8 298.6ci 1b	4dr Cabriolet 4p, 4dr Phaeton Sedan 5P, 2dr Roadster 2/4P, 4dr Sedan 5P, 2dr Speedster 2P, 4dr Sport Sedan 5P	other info
	1929	6-76		6		Cabriolet, Roadster, Sedan, Sport Sedan, Touring, Victoria	From SCAC. Caaarguide.com makes no mention of the 6-76 for 1929.
	1929	6-80	120in	6	65; L6 185ci 1b	2dr Cabriolet 4P, 4dr Sedan 5P, 4dr Sport Sedan 5P, Touring, 2dr Victoria Sedan 5P	Caaarguide.com lists only four body styles for the model 6-80 (current listing without "Touring").
	1929	8-88		8		Cabriolet, Phaeton, Roadster, Sedan, Speedster, Sport Sedan, Touring, Victoria	SCAC lists these 8 body styles for model 8-88 in 1929. Caaarguide.com does not list the 8-88 for this year.
	1929	8-90	125in	8	93; L8 246.7ci 1b	2dr Cabriolet 4P, 4dr Phaeton Sedan, 4dr Sedan 5P, 4dr Sedan 7P, 2dr Speedster 2P, 4dr Sport Sedan 5P, 2dr Victoria Sedan 5P	The SCAC refers to a 8-90 Touring, which is likely the "4dr Sedan 5P" or "4dr sedan 7P".
	1929	8-115		8		Cabriolet, Phaeton, Roadster, Sedan, Speedster, Sport Sedan, Victoria	SCAC lists these 7 body styles for model 8-115 in 1929. Caaarguide.com does not list the 8-115 for this year.
	1929	8-120	130in	8	115; L8 298.6ci 1b	4dr Cabriolet 4, 4dr Phaeton Sedan 5P, 4dr Sedan 5P, Sedan 7P, 2dr Speedster 2P, 4dr Sport Sedan 5P, 2dr Victoria Sedan 5P	Caaarguide.com lists 6 body styles (excluding Sedan 7P). SCAC lists all 7 body styles.
	1930	6-85	120in	6	70; L6 185ci 1b	2dr Cabriolet 4P, 4dr Sedan 5P, 4dr Sport Sedan 5P	
	1930	8-95	125in	8	100; L8 246.7ci 1b	2dr Cabriolet 4P, 4dr Phaeton Sedan 5P, 4dr Sedan 5P, 4dr Sport Sedan 5P	
	1930	8-125	130in	8	125; L8 298.6ci 1b	4dr Cabriolet 4P, 4dr Phaeton Sedan 5P, 4dr Sedan 5P, 4dr Sport Sedan 5P	
	1931	8-98 (Standard)	127in	8	98; L8 268.6 1b	2dr Brougham 5P, 2dr Business Man's Coupe 2/4P, 2dr Cabriolet 2/4P, 4dr Phaeton Sedan 5P, 4dr Sedan 5P, 2dr Speedster 2P	
	1931	8-98 (Standard)	136in	8		Sedan 7P	The SCAC lists two 7P sedans at 136in wb, presumably one Standard (8-98) and one Custom (8-98A). Caaarguide.com does not list any models with 136in wb.
	1931	8-98A (Custom)	127in	8	98; L8 268.6ci 1b	2dr Brougham 5P, 2dr Business Man's Coupe 2/4P, 2dr Cabriolet 2/4P, 4dr Phaeton Sedan 5P, 4dr Sedan 5P, 2dr Speedster 2P	
	1931	8-98A (Custom)	136in	8		Sedan 7P	The SCAC lists two 7P sedans at 136in wb, presumably one Standard (8-98) and one Custom (8-98A). Caaarguide.com does not list any models with 136in wb.
	1932	8-100 (Standard)	127in	8	100; L8 286.6ci 1b	2dr Brougham 5P, 2dr Business Man's Coupe 2/4P, 2dr Cabriolet 2/4P, 4dr Phaeton Sedan 5P, 4dr Sedan 5P, 2dr Speedster 2P	For the 8-100 and 8-100A, where Caaarguide.com lists "Standard" and "Custom", the SCAC lists "Custom" and "Custom Dual Ratio" respectively.
	1932	8-100 (Standard)	136in	8	100; L8 268.6ci 1b	4dr Sedan 7P	
	1932	8-100A (Custom)	127in	8	100; L8 268.6ci 1b	2dr Brougham 5P, 2dr Business Man's Coupe 2/4P, 2dr Cabriolet 2/4P, 4dr Phaeton Sedan 5P, 4dr Sedan 5P, 2dr Speedster 2P	
	1932	8-100A (Custom)	136in	8	100; L8 268.6ci 1b	4dr Sedan 7P	
	1932	12-160 (Standard)	133in	12	160; V12 391.1ci 2x1b	2dr Brougham 5P, 2dr Business Man's Coupe 2/4P, 2dr Cabriolet 2/4P, 4dr Phaeton Sedan 5P, 4dr Sedan 5P, 2dr Speedster 2P	For the 12-160 and 12-160A, where Caaarguide.com lists "Standard" and "Custom", the SCAC lists "Standard" and "Custom Dual Ratio" respectively. 1932 was the first year for the 12-cylinder engine.
	1932	12-160A (Custom)	133in	12	160; V12 391.1ci 2x1b	2dr Brougham 5P, 2dr Business Man's Coupe 2/4P, 2dr Cabriolet 2/4P, 4dr Phaeton Sedan 5P, 4dr Sedan 5P, 2dr Speedster 2P	
	1933	8-101 (Standard)	127in	8	100; L8 268.6ci 1b	2dr Brougham 5P, 2dr Business Man's Coupe 2/4P, 2dr Cabriolet 2/4P, 4dr Phaeton Sedan 5P, 4dr Sedan 5P, 4dr Sedan 7P, 2dr Speedster 2P	
	1933	8-101 (Standard)	136in	8	L8 268.6ci 1b	4dr Sedan 7P	The SCAC lists this 8-101 Standard 7P Sedan with a 136-inch wb, while Caaarguide.com lists it with a 127-inch wb.
	1933	8-101A (Custom Dual Ratio)	127in	8	L8 268.6ci 1b	2dr Brougham 5P, 2dr Business Man's Coupe 2/4P, 2dr Cabriolet 2/4P, 4dr Phaeton Sedan 5P, 4dr Sedan 5P, 2dr Speedster 2P	The SCAC lists the 8-101A model number, but Caaarguide.com doesn't.
	1933	8-101A (Custom Dual Ratio)	136in	8	L8 268.6ci 1b	4dr Sedan 7P	The SCAC lists the 8-101A model number, but Caaarguide.com doesn't.
	1933	8-105 (Custom)	127in	8	100; L8 268.6ci 1b	2dr Brougham 5P, 2dr Business Man's Coupe 2/4P, 2dr Cabriolet 2/4P, 4dr Phaeton Sedan 5P, 4dr Sedan 5P, 2dr Speedster 2P	The SCAC lists the 8-105 model as a "Salon Dual Ratio" in 5 body styles (Brougham, Cabriolet, Phaeton, Sedan, and Speedster).
	1933	8-105 (Custom)	136in	8	100; L8 268.6ci 1b	4dr Sedan 5P	
	1933	12-161 (Standard)	133in	12	160; V12 391.1ci 2x1b	2dr Brougham 5P, 2dr Business Man's Coupe 2/4P, 2dr Cabriolet 2/4P, 4dr Phaeton Sedan 5P, 4dr Sedan 5P, 2dr Speedster 2P	
	1933	12-161A (Custom Dual Ratio)	?	12	160; V12 391.1ci 2x1b	2dr Brougham 5P, 2dr Business Man's Coupe 2/4P, 2dr Cabriolet 2/4P, 4dr Phaeton Sedan 5P, 4dr Sedan 5P, 2dr Speedster 2P	The SCAC lists the 12-161A model (with unspecified wb), but Caaarguide.com does not.
	1933	12-165 (Salon)	133in	12	160; V12 391.1ci 2x1b	2dr Brougham 5P, 2dr Business Man's Coupe 2/4P, 2dr Cabriolet 2/4P, 4dr Phaeton Sedan 5P, 4dr Sedan 5P, 2dr Speedster 2P	The SCAC lists the 12-165 model as a "Salon Dual Ratio" in 5 body styles (Brougham, Cabriolet, Phaeton, Sedan, and Speedster).
	1934	6-52X (Standard)	119in	6	85; L6 210ci 1b	2dr Brougham 5P, 2dr Cabriolet 2/4P, 4dr Sedan 5P	
	1934	6-52Y (Custom)	119in	6	85; L6 210ci 1b	2dr Brougham 5P, 2dr Cabriolet 2/4P, 4dr Phaeton Sedan 5P, 4dr Sedan 5P	
	1934	8-50X (Standard)	126in	8	115; L8 279.9ci 1b	2dr Brougham 5P, 2dr Cabriolet 2/4P, 4dr Sedan 5P, 2dr Speedster 2P	The SCAC does not list a Speedster body style for the 8-50X for the year 1934.
	1934	8-50Y (Custom)	126in	8	115; L8 279.9ci 1b	2dr Brougham 5P, 2dr Cabriolet 2/4P, 4dr Phaeton Sedan 5P, 4dr Sedan 5P, 2dr Speedster 2P	The SCAC does not list a speedster body style for the 8-50Y for the year 1934.
	1934	12-50 (Salon Dual Ratio)	?	12		2dr Brougham, Cabriolet, Phaeton, Sedan	Caaarguide.com does not list a model 12-50 (or model 1250) for the year 1934.
	1934	12-165 (Salon)	133in	12	160; V12 391.1ci 2x1b	2dr Brougham 5P, 2dr Cabriolet 2/4P, 4dr Phaeton Sedan 5P, 4dr Sedan 5P, 2dr Speedster 2P	The SCAC does not list a model 12-165 for the year 1934.
	1935	6-653 (Standard)	120in	6	85; L6 210ci 1b	2dr Brougham 5P, 2dr Cabriolet 2/4P, 2dr Coupe 4P, 4dr Phaeton Sedan 5P, 4dr Sedan 5P	Caaarguide.com does not list this as a "Standard" series. It just refers to the "(Auburn) 653".
	1935	6-653 (Custom Dual Ratio)	120in	6	85; L6 210ci 1b	2dr Brougham 5P, 2dr Cabriolet 2/4P, 2dr Coupe 4P, 4dr Phaeton Sedan 5P, 4dr Sedan 5P	Caaarguide.com does not list this as a "Custom Dual Ratio" series. It just refers to the "(Auburn) 653 Custom".
	1935	6-653 (Salon Dual Ratio)	120in	6	85; L6 210ci 1b	2dr Brougham 5P, 2dr Cabriolet 2/4P, 2dr Coupe 4P, 4dr Phaeton Sedan 5P, 4dr Sedan 5P	Caaarguide.com does not list this as a "Salon Dual Ratio" series. It just refers to the "(Auburn) 653 Salon".
	1935	8-851 (Standard)	127in	8	115; L8 279.9ci 1b	2dr Brougham 5P, 2dr Cabriolet 2/4P, 2dr Coupe 4P, 4dr Phaeton Sedan 5P, 4dr Sedan 5P	Caaarguide.com does not list this as a "Standard" series. It just refers to the "(Auburn) 851".
	1935	8-851 (Custom Dual Ratio)	127in	8	115; L8 279.9ci 1b	2dr Brougham 5P, 2dr Cabriolet 2/4P, 2dr Coupe 4P, 4dr Phaeton Sedan 5P, 4dr Sedan 5P	Caaarguide.com does not list this as a "Custom Dual Ratio" series. It just refers to the "(Auburn) 851 Custom".
	1935	8-851 (Salon Dual Ratio)	127in	8	115; L8 279.9ci 1b	2dr Brougham 5P, 2dr Cabriolet 2/4P, 2dr Coupe 4P, 4dr Phaeton Sedan 5P, 4dr Sedan 5P	Caaarguide.com does not list this as a "Salon Dual Ratio" series. It just refers to the "(Auburn) 851 Salon".
	1935	8-851 (Supercharged Dual Ratio)	127in	8	150; L8 279.9ci 2b supercharged	2dr Brougham 5P, 2dr Cabriolet 2/4P, 2dr Coupe 4P, 4dr Phaeton Sedan 5P, 4dr Sedan 5P, 2dr Speedster 2P	Caaarguide.com does not list this as a "Supercharged Dual Ratio" series. It just refers to the "(Auburn) SC 851".
	1936	6-654 (Standard)	120in	6	85; L6 201ci 1b	2dr Brougham 5P, 2dr Cabriolet 2/4P, 2dr Coupe 4P, 4dr Phaeton Sedan 5P, 4dr Sedan 5P	Caaarguide.com does not list this as a "Standard" series. It just refers to the "(Auburn) 654".
	1936	6-654 (Custom Dual Ratio)	120in	6	85; L6 201ci 1b	2dr Brougham 5P, 2dr Cabriolet 2/4P, 2dr Coupe 4P, 4dr Phaeton Sedan 5P, 4dr Sedan 5P	Caaarguide.com does not list this as a "Custom Dual Ratio" series. It just refers to the "(Auburn) 654 Custom".
	1936	6-654 (Salon Dual Ratio)	120in	6	85; L6 201ci 1b	2dr Brougham 5P, 2dr Cabriolet 2/4P, 2dr Coupe 4P, 4dr Phaeton Sedan 5P, 4dr Sedan 5P	Caaarguide.com does not list this as a "Salon Dual Ratio" series. It just refers to the "(Auburn) 654 Salon".
	1936	8-852 (Standard)	127in	8	115; L8 279.9ci 1b	2dr Brougham 5P, 2dr Cabriolet 2/4P, 2dr Coupe 4P, 4dr Phaeton Sedan 5P, 4dr Sedan 5P	Caaarguide.com does not list this as a "Standard" series. It just refers to the "(Auburn) 852".
	1936	8-852 (Custom Dual Ratio)	127in	8	115; L8 279.9ci 1b	2dr Brougham 5P, 2dr Cabriolet 2/4P, 2dr Coupe 4P, 4dr Phaeton Sedan 5P, 4dr Sedan 5P	Caaarguide.com does not list this as a "Custom Dual Ratio" series. It just refers to the "(Auburn) 852 Custom".
	1936	8-852 (Salon Dual Ratio)	127in	8	115; L8 279.9ci 1b	2dr Brougham 5P, 2dr Cabriolet 2/4P, 2dr Coupe 4P, 4dr Phaeton Sedan 5P, 4dr Sedan 5P	Caaarguide.com does not list this as a "Salon Dual Ratio" series. It just refers to the "(Auburn) 852 Salon".
	1936	8-852 (Supercharged Dual Ratio)	127in	8	150; L8 279.9ci 2b supercharged	2dr Brougham 5P, 2dr Cabriolet 2/4P, 2dr Coupe 4P, 4dr Phaeton Sedan 5P, 4dr Sedan 5P, 2dr Speedster 2P	Caaarguide.com does not list this as a "Supercharged Dual Ratio" series. It just refers to the "(Auburn) SC 852".

== Model number cross-reference ==
- Beauty Six (See model 6-39 in years 1919-21 and model 6-51 in year 1922 above.)
- SC 851 (See "8-851 (Supercharged Dual Ratio)" in year 1935 above.)
- SC 852 (See "8-852 (Supercharged Dual Ratio)" in year 1936 above.)
- Six-45 (See model 6-45 in year 1913 above.)
- Six-45-B (See model 6-45 in year 1913 above.)
- Six-50 (See model 6-50 in year 1913 above.)
- Union (See model 4-36 in year 1916 and model 4-34 in year 1917 above.)
- Model 8-Eighty-Eight (See model 8-88 in years 1925-29 above.)
- Model 30-33-L (See model 33L in year 1913 above.)
- Model 30-33-M (See model 33M in year 1913 above.)
- Model 35L (See model 35L in year 1912 and model 37L in year 1913 above.)
- Model 45 (See model 6-45 in year 1913 above.)
- Model 45B (See model 6-45 in year 1913 above.)
- Model 50 (See model 6-50 in years 1912 and 1913 above.)
- Model 66 (See model 6-76 in year 1928 above.)
- Model 76 (See model 6-76 in years 1928 and 1929 above.)
- Model 88 (See model 8-88 in years 1928 and 1929 above.)
- Model 115 (See model 8-115 in years 1928 and 1929 above.)
- Model 120 (See model 8-120 in year 1929 above.)
- Model 125 (See model 8-125 in year 1930 above.)
- Model 653 (See model 6-653 in year 1935 above.)
- Model 654 (See model 6-654 in year 1936 above.)
- Model 652X (See model 6-52X in year 1934 above.)
- Model 652Y (See model 6-52Y in year 1934 above.)
- Model 850X (See model 8-52X in year 1934 above.)
- Model 850Y (See model 8-50Y in year 1934 above.)
- Model 851 (See model 8-851 in year 1935 above.)
- Model 852 (See model 8-852 in year 1936 above.)
- Model 1250 (See model 12-50 in year 1934 above.)
