= Duesenberg Model J =

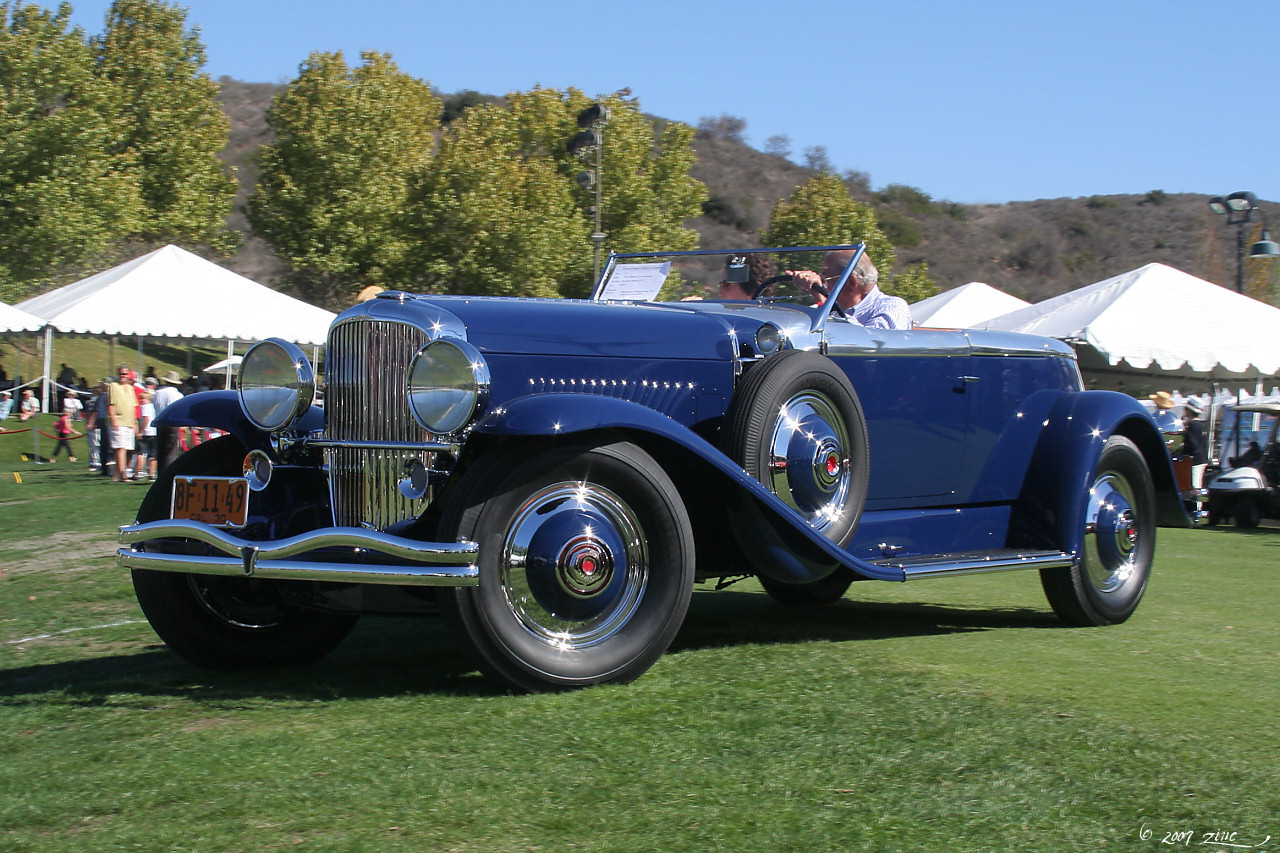
- 1930 Duesenberg J Murphy Torpedo Convertible

Overview
- Manufacturer: Duesenberg
- Also called: Duesenberg J; Duesenberg SJ (supercharged); Duesenberg SSJ (short-wheelbase supercharged)
- Production: 1928–1937; 481 produced (445 Model J, 36 Model SJ)
- Assembly: Indianapolis, Indiana, United States
- Designer: Gordon Buehrig

Body and chassis
- Class: Ultra-luxury car
- Body style: Coachbuilt to owner's preference
- Layout: Front mid-engine, rear-wheel-drive

Powertrain
- Engine: 6.9 L (420 cu in) DOHC Duesenberg Straight-8 engine, optional supercharger
- Transmission: 3-speed manual

Dimensions
- Wheelbase: 3,619.5 mm (142.5 in) (standard); 3,898.9 mm (153.5 in) (optional long); 3,175.0 mm (125 in) ("SSJ" short wheelbase)

Chronology
- Predecessor: Duesenberg Model X

The Duesenberg Model J is a luxury automobile made by Duesenberg that debuted in 1928 and offered for ten subsequent years. Intended to compete with the most luxurious and powerful cars in the world, it was introduced in 1928, the year before the stock market crash that led to the Great Depression. Duesenberg Motors Company went bankrupt in 1937.

== Background ==
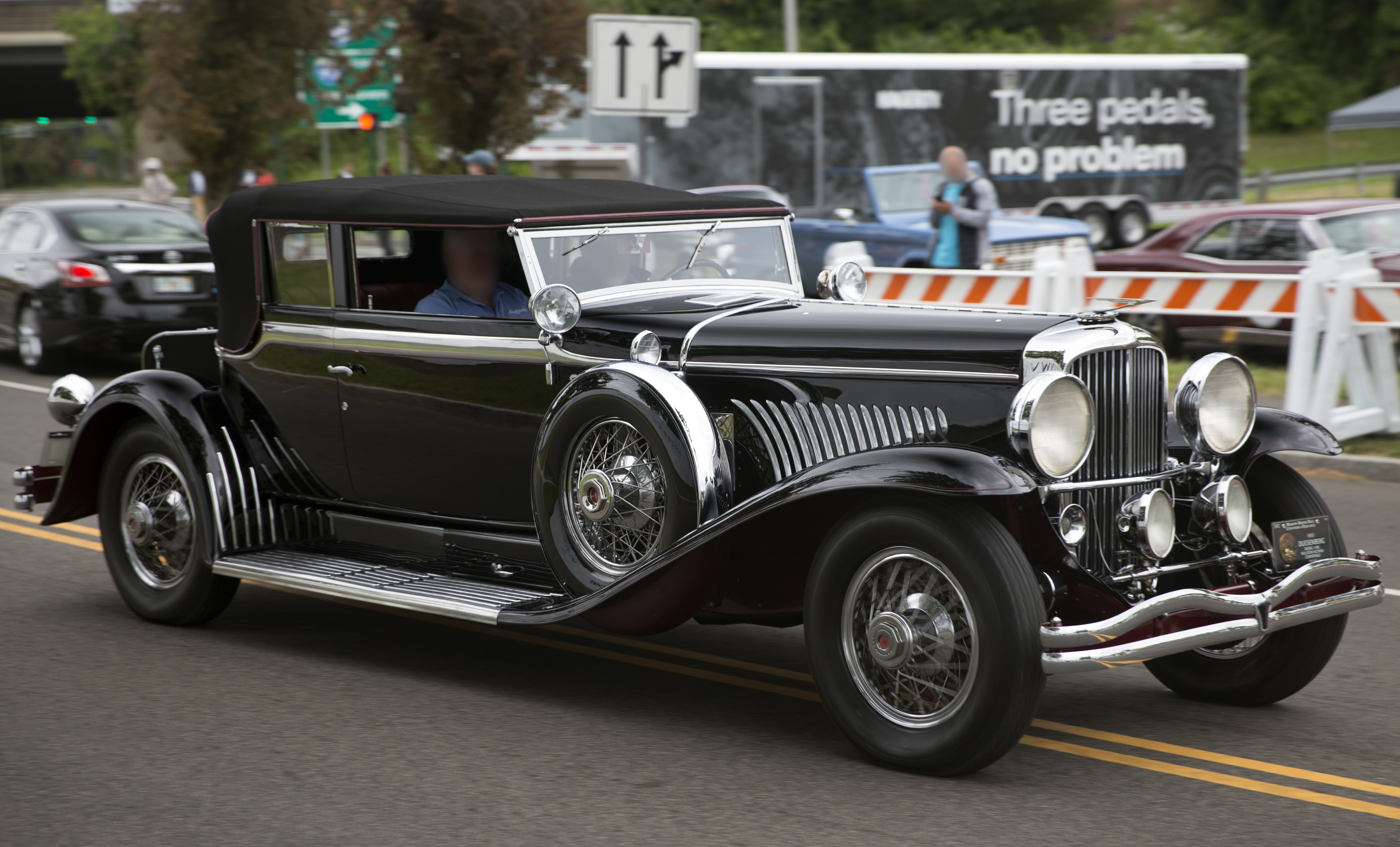
1931 Duesenberg Model J Victoria Convertible by Rollston

E. L. Cord, the owner of Auburn Automobile Company, and other transportation firms, bought the Duesenberg Motor Corporation on October 26, 1926, for the brothers' engineering skills, talent and brand name. He intended to produce a car to rival the size, power, and luxury of top European brands such as Hispano-Suiza and Rolls-Royce.

After Cord's takeover, the new company was renamed "Duesenberg, Inc." Fred Duesenberg would continue in the new organization with the title of vice president in charge of engineering and experimental work. Fred's brother August, who had played an important role in the development of the Model A and its variant, the rare X, had nothing to do with the initial design of the J and had no formal connection with Duesenberg, Inc. until later. According to the expert Marshall Merkes, "Cord did not want Augie around." However, all Duesenberg racing cars produced after 1926 were built by Augie in an enterprise that functioned separately, and in a building apart from the main Duesenberg plant. He was also responsible for a number of engineering achievements like the superchargers developed for both the Auburn and Cord motorcars.

== Debut ==
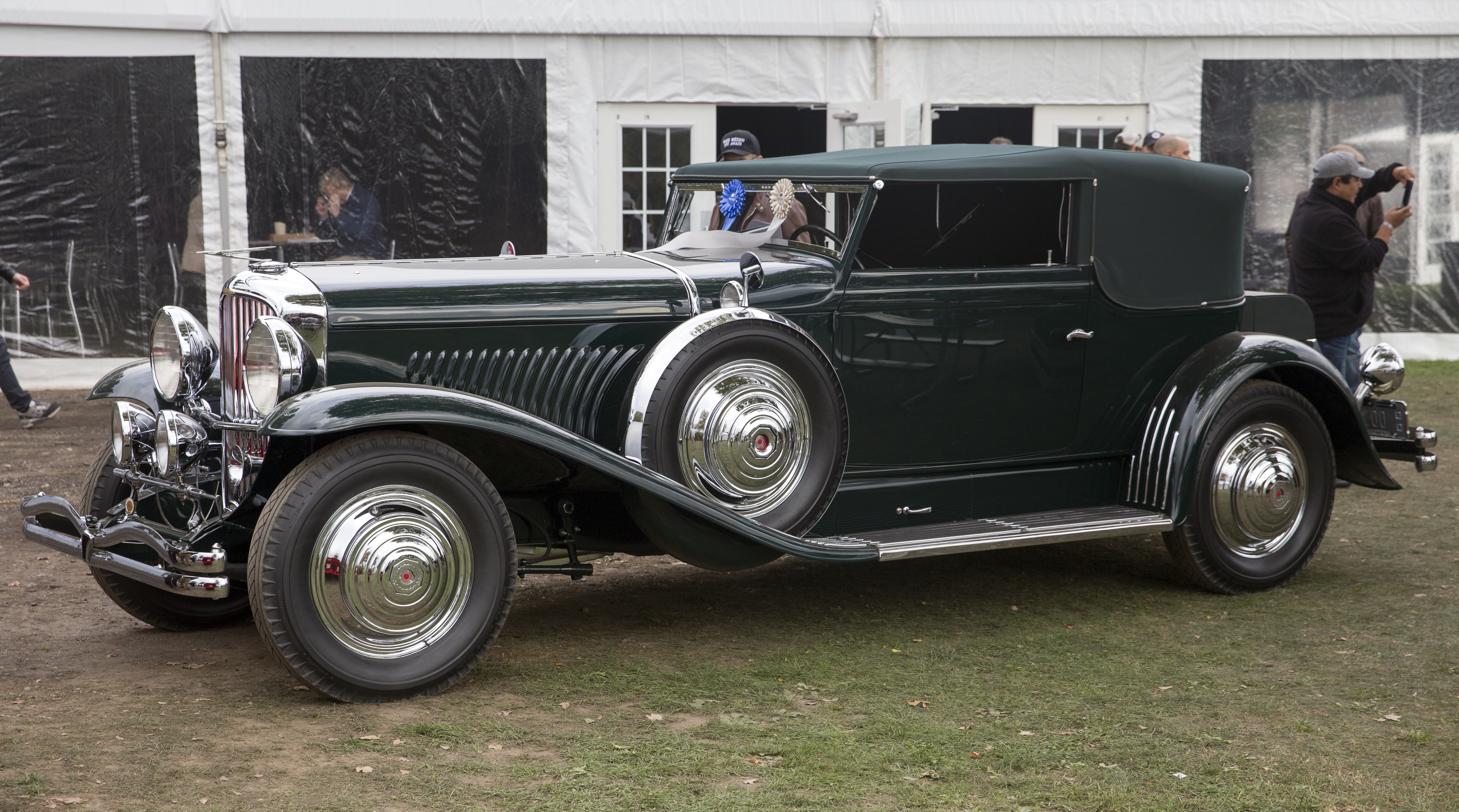
1931 Duesenberg J Convertible Victoria by Rollston

The newly revived Duesenberg company set about to produce the Model J, which debuted December 1 at the New York Car Show of 1928. In Europe, it was launched at the "Salon de l'automobile de Paris" of 1929. The first and — at the time of the New York presentation, only — example made of the series, the J-101, was a LeBaron sweep panel dual cowl phaeton, finished in silver and black. By the time the Great Depression hit in October 1929, the Duesenberg Company had only built some 200 cars. An additional 100 orders were filled in 1930. Thus, the Model J fell short of the original goal to sell 500 cars a year. Most engine and chassis were made in 1929 and 1930, but due to the Depression, high price, etc., ended up sold and bodied throughout subsequent years. Thus the year for a given Model J usually refers to the latter.

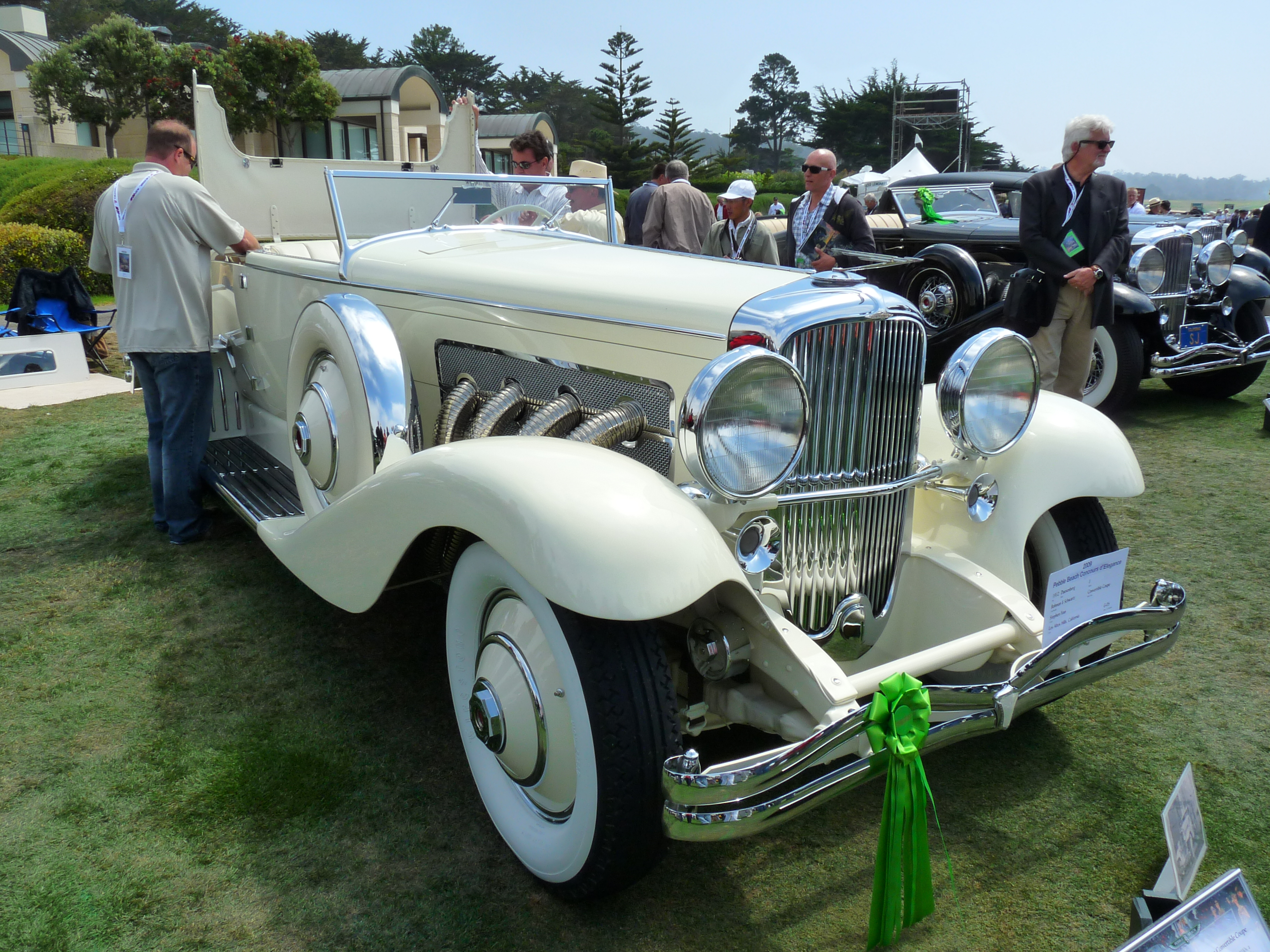
1932 Duesenberg SJ Bohman & Schwartz Convertible Coupe

== Engine ==
Duesenberg Model J engine
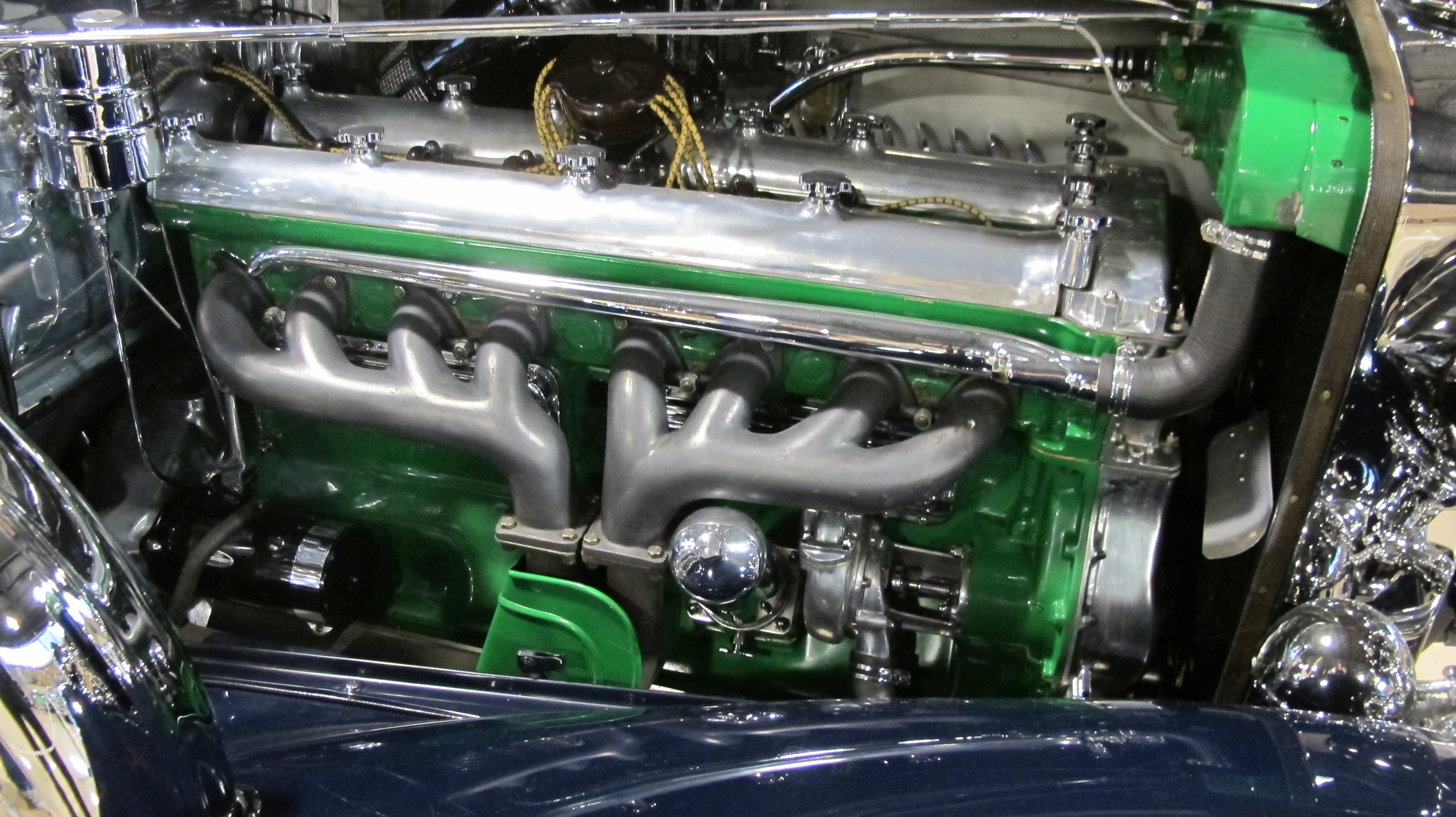

Overview
- Manufacturer: Duesenberg
- Production: 1928–1937

Layout
- Configuration: Straight-eight engine
- Displacement: 420 cu in (6,900 cc)
- Cylinder bore: 3.74 in (95 mm)
- Piston stroke: 4.76 in (121 mm)
- Cylinder block material: cast iron
- Cylinder head material: cast iron
- Valvetrain: DOHC, 4 valves per cylinder
- Compression ratio: 5.7:1

Combustion
- Supercharger: Duesenberg centrifugal (optional from 1932)
- Fuel system: Single updraft Schleber carburetor
- Fuel type: gasoline
- Cooling system: water-cooled

Output
- Power output: 265 hp (198 kW) at 4250 rpm, (normal); 320 hp (240 kW) at 4200 rpm (supercharged); 400 hp (300 kW) supercharged Model SSJ

Chronology
- Predecessor: Duesenberg Model A engine

Duesenberg Model SJ supercharged straight-eight engine

The 420 cu in (6,900 cc) straight eight Model J motor was based on the company's successful racing engines of the 1920s and though designed by Duesenberg they were manufactured by Lycoming, another company owned by Cord. In normally aspirated form, it produced 265 horsepower (198 kW) from dual overhead camshafts and four valves per cylinder. It was capable of a top speed of 116 mph (187 km/h), and 89 mph (143 km/h) in 2nd gear. Other cars featured a bigger engine but none of them surpassed its power. It was also both the fastest and most expensive American automobile on the market.

== Design and development ==
As was common practice among the luxury car brands, only the chassis and engine were displayed; the body and interior trim of the car would be custom-made to the owner's specifications by a third-party coachbuilder. The chassis on most model Js were the same, as was the styling of such elements as fenders, headlamps, radiator, hood and instrument panel.

About half the model Js built by Duesenberg had coachworks devised by the company's chief body designer, Gordon Buehrig, and executed under the name La Grande by company branches in Chicago, New York City, Los Angeles, Philadelphia, Florida and Denver, as well as by smaller dealers. The rest were designed and made by independent US coachbuilders such as Derham, Holbrook, Judkins, Le Baron, Murphy, Rollston (later renamed Rollson), Walker, Weymann, and Willoughby, and Fernandez et Darrin, Franay, Gurney Nutting, Saoutchik, and others in Europe. The chassis cost US$8,500 ($200,579 in 2025 dollars) ($9,500 after 1932 ($224,177 in 2025 dollars)). At a time when the average U.S. physician earned less than $3,000 a year ($70,793 in 2025 dollars), most completed vehicles fell between $13,000 and $19,000 ($448,354 in 2025 dollars), with two American-bodied J's reaching $25,000 ($589,939 in 2025 dollars)). Figures for prices charged by deluxe coachbuilders in Europe are not available, but it is possible they were even higher than the most expensive American built models.

The J was generally available with either with a short 142.5 in (3.62 m) wheelbase chassis or long 153.5 in (3.90 m)). Special orders included two SSJs shortened to 125 in (3.18 m) and a few extended to 160 in (4.06 m) and over.

The dash included mechanically timed lights that reminded the driver when to change the oil and inspect the battery.

A series of minor modifications were carried out during the model's production life. The first major change was to replace the four-speed gearbox, which proved unable to handle the engine's power, with an unsynchronised three-speed gearbox, subsequently fitted to all Duesenbergs. Unlike almost all American manufacturers, Duesenberg did not switch to a fully synchronised gearbox in the mid-1930s, which made the Model J difficult to drive and outdated by the latter years of its run. The factory closed in 1937.

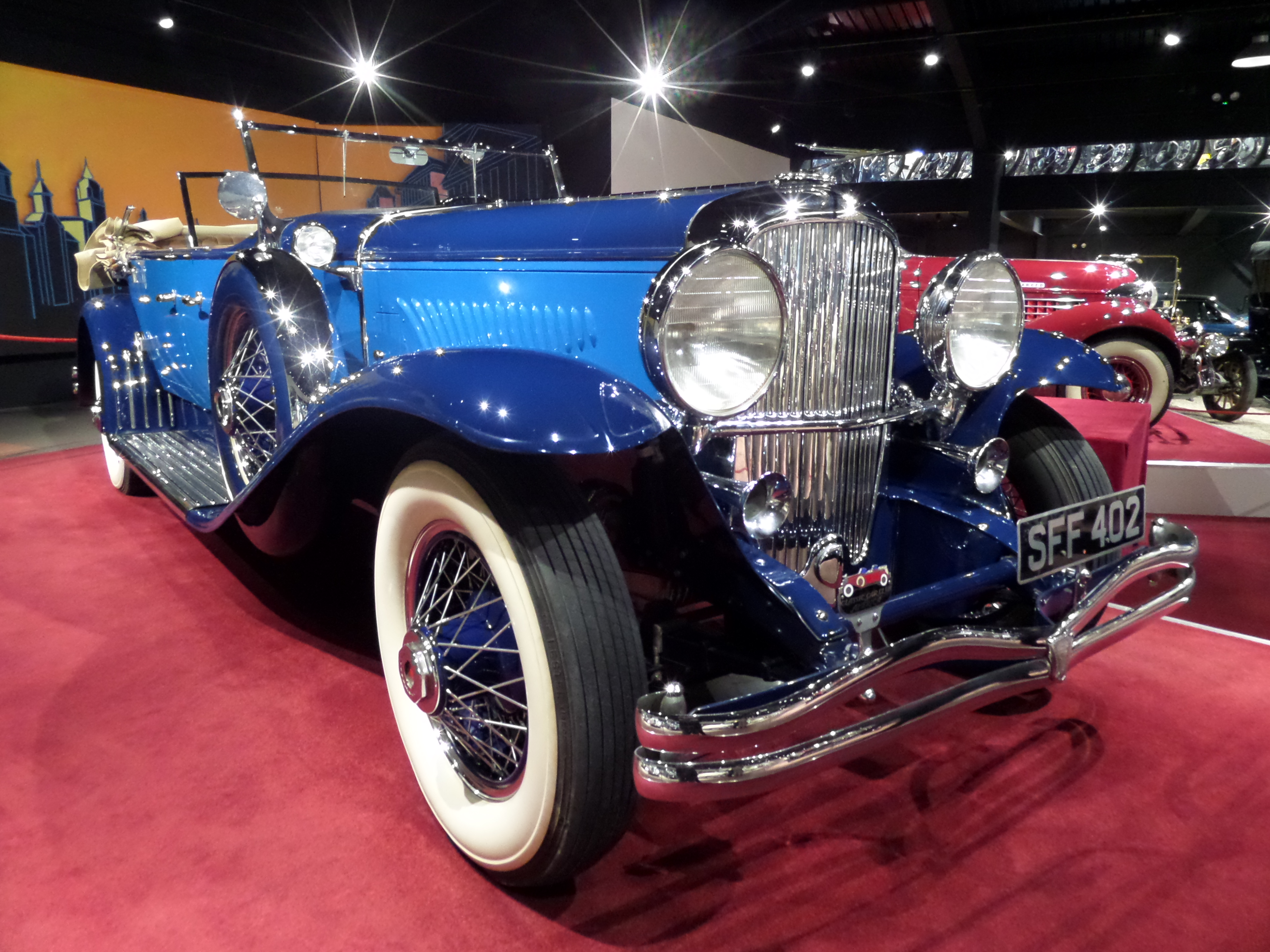
1931 Duesenberg Model J Derham bodied Tourster

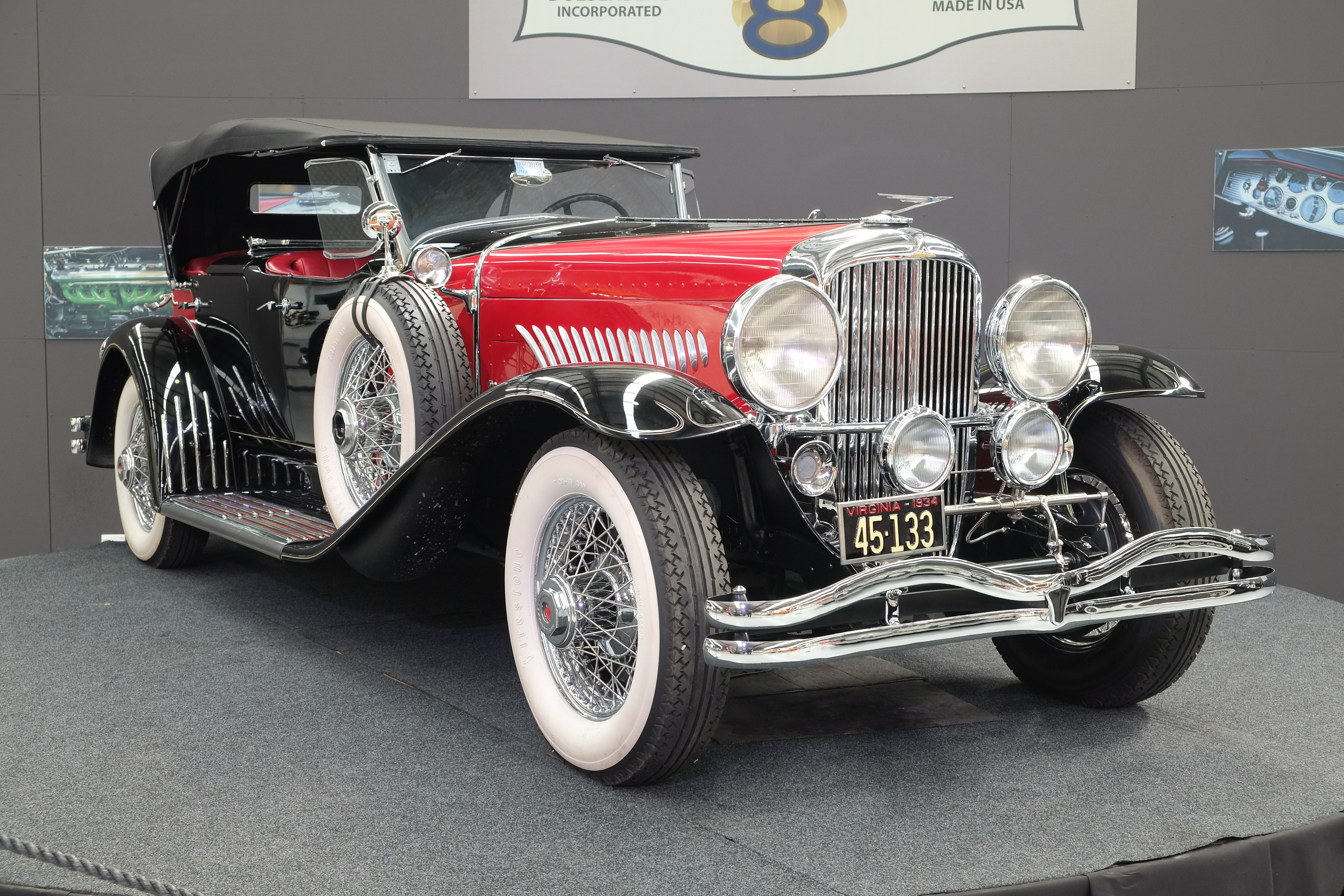
1934 Duesenberg Model J LaGrande Dual Cowl Phaeton by LeBaron

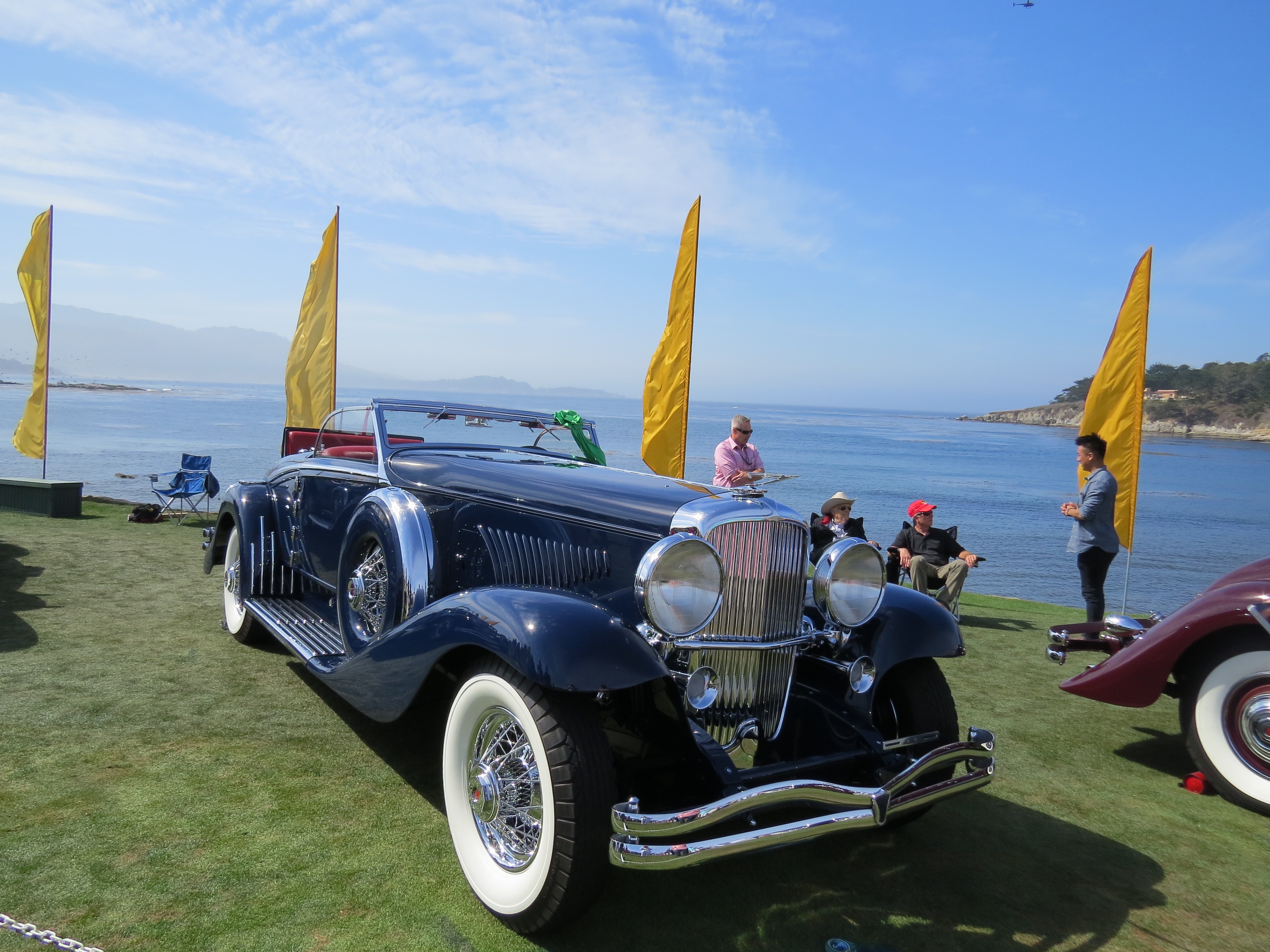
1934 Duesenberg J Walker-LaGrande Convertible Coupe

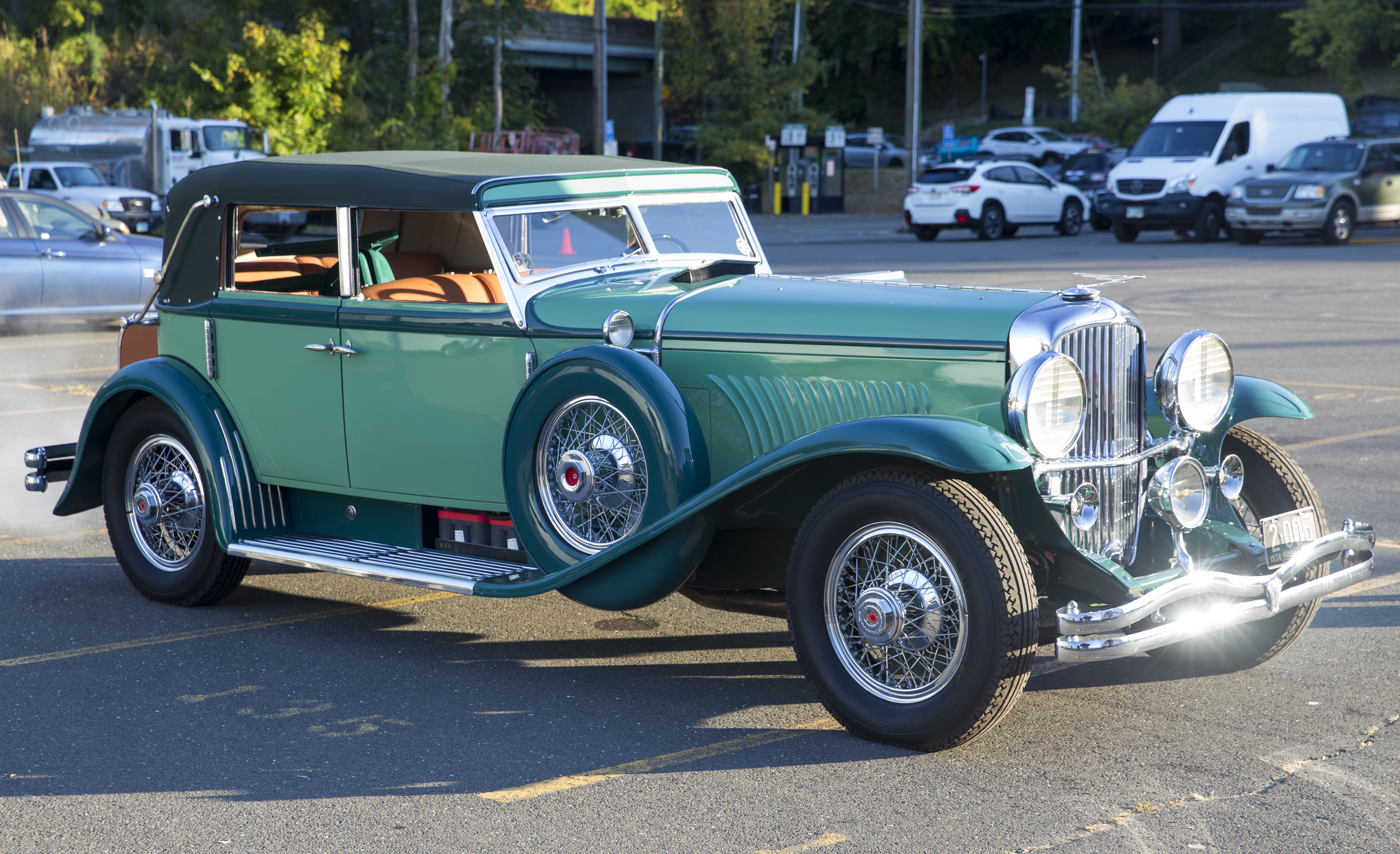
1934 Duesenberg Model J Convertible Sedan by Derham

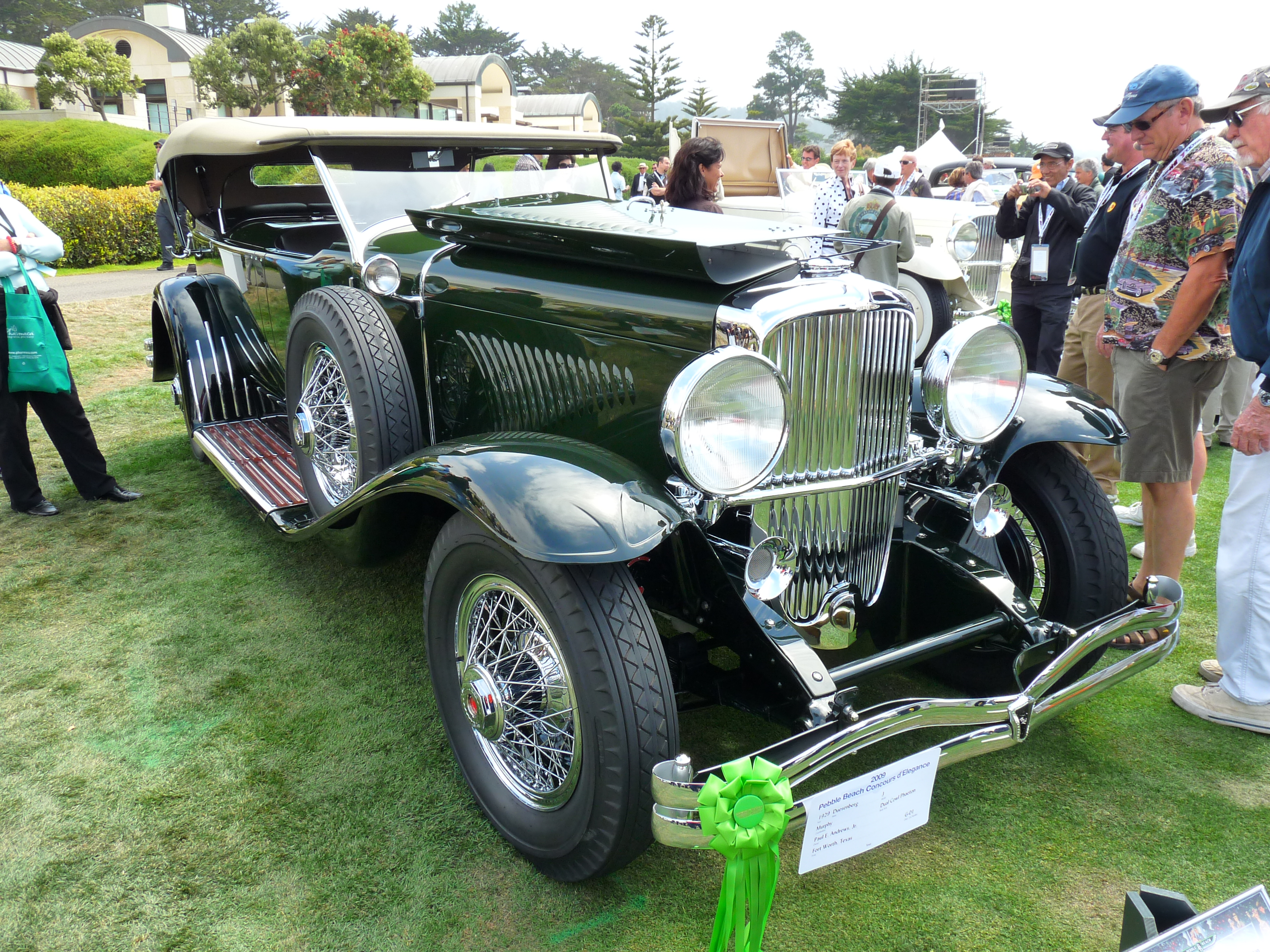
1929 Duesenberg J Murphy Dual Cowl Phaeton

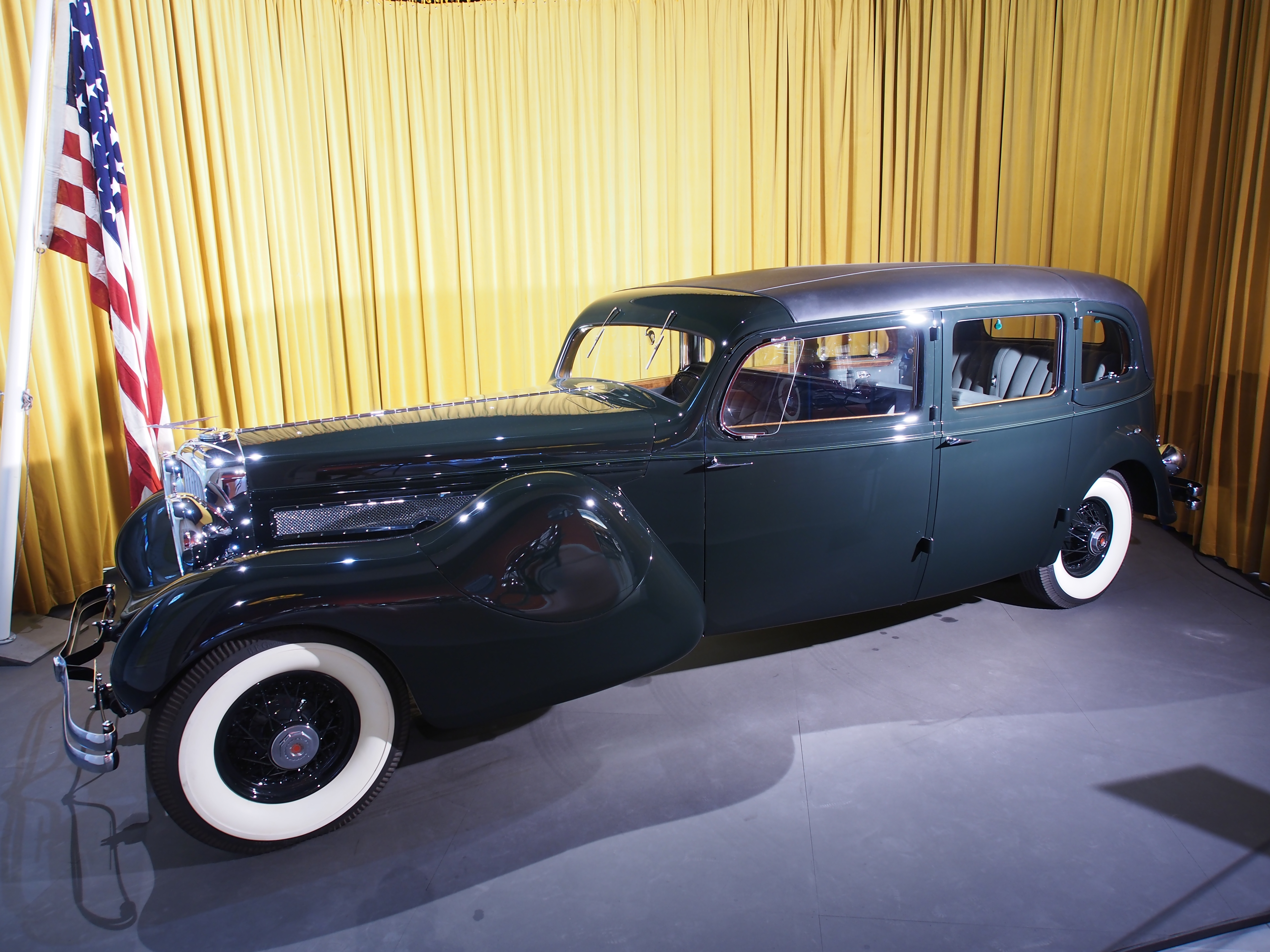
1937 Düsenberg Model J Limousine Landaulette

== Supercharged version (SJ) ==
A Duesenberg marketing slogan was that the only car that could pass a Duesenberg was another Duesenberg—and that was with the first owner's consent.

Reinforcing this claim was the powerful 320 hp (239 kW) supercharged "SJ" model developed on the 142.5 in (362 cm) wheelbase by Fred Duesenberg and introduced in May 1932. It reputed to be capable of 104 miles per hour (167 km/h) in second gear and have a top speed of around 130 mph (209 km/h) in third. Zero-to-60 mph (97 km/h) times of around eight seconds and 0–100 mph (0–161 km/h) in 17 seconds were reported for the SJ in spite of the unsynchronized transmissions, at a time when even the best cars of the era were not likely to reach 100 mph (160 km/h). Duesenbergs generally weighed around two and a half tons; up to three tons was not unusual, considering the wide array of custom coachwork available.

The SJ's supercharger was located beside the engine; the vertical driving shaft necessitated a redesigned exhaust manifold arrangement; originally this took the form of a one-piece eight into one Monel manifold that re-routed the exhaust away from the engine, outside the engine compartment and through a single hole in the right front fender. The eight port manifold was found to be prone to cracking and was quickly superseded by a second manifold arrangement that routed four branches through the right side panel of the hood and right front fender. At least one supercharged car retains its original eight port manifold while most can be recognized by the four exposed exhaust pipes encased within bright flexible metal conduit tubes, a design which Cord registered as a trademark and used in his supercharged Cords and Auburns. The flamboyant external exhaust pipes were offered both as an option on new normally aspirated Model Js and retrofit to earlier Model Js.

Fred Duesenberg died of pneumonia on July 26, 1932, resulting from injuries sustained in an automobile accident in which he was driving a Murphy SJ convertible. His brother, Augie, took over Fred's duties as chief engineer and Harold T. Ames became president of Duesenberg, Inc. Only 36 SJs were ever built.

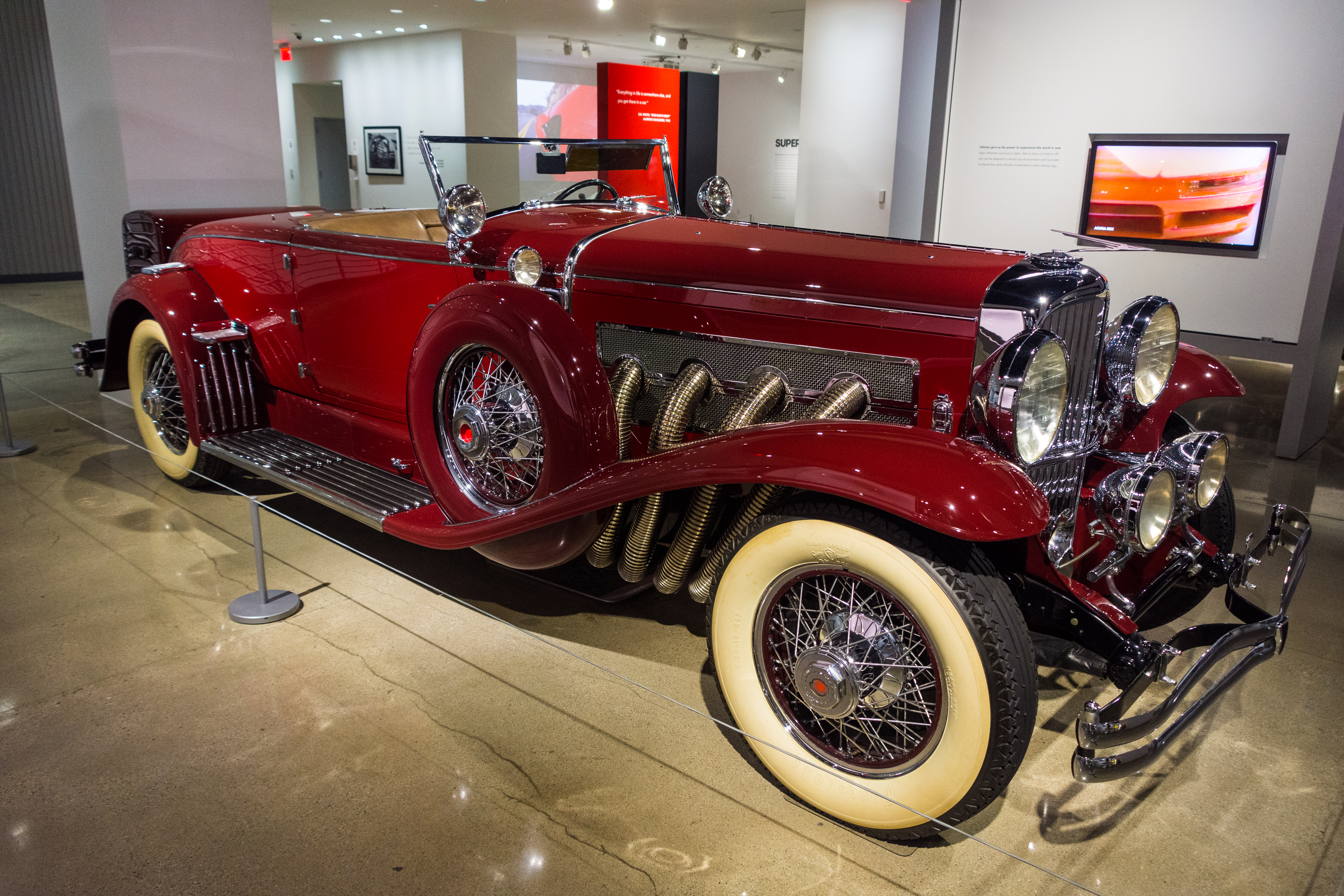
1933 Duesenberg SJ Convertible Coupe

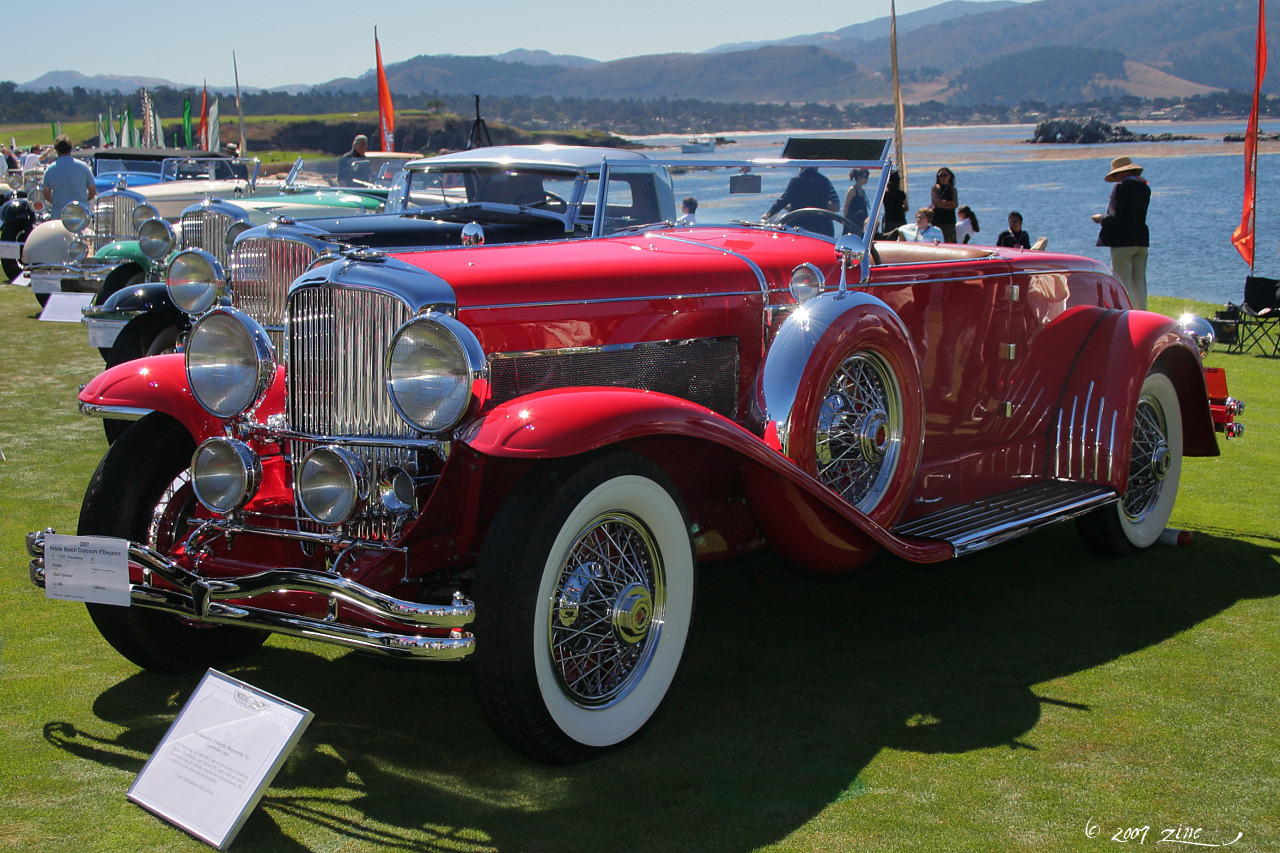
1930 SJ Disappearing Top Convertible Coupe by Murphy

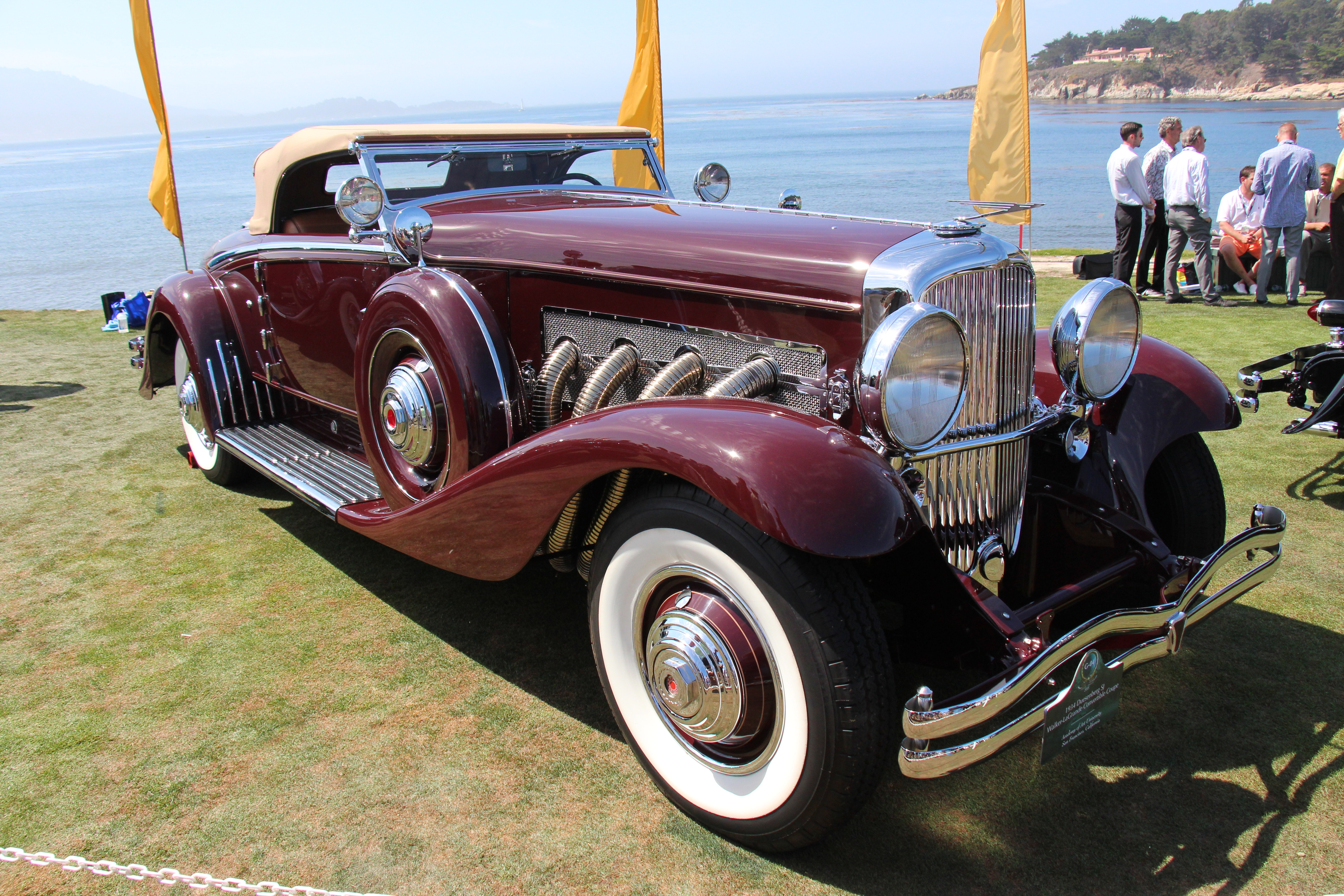
1934 Duesenberg SJ Convertible Coupe by Walker-LaGrande

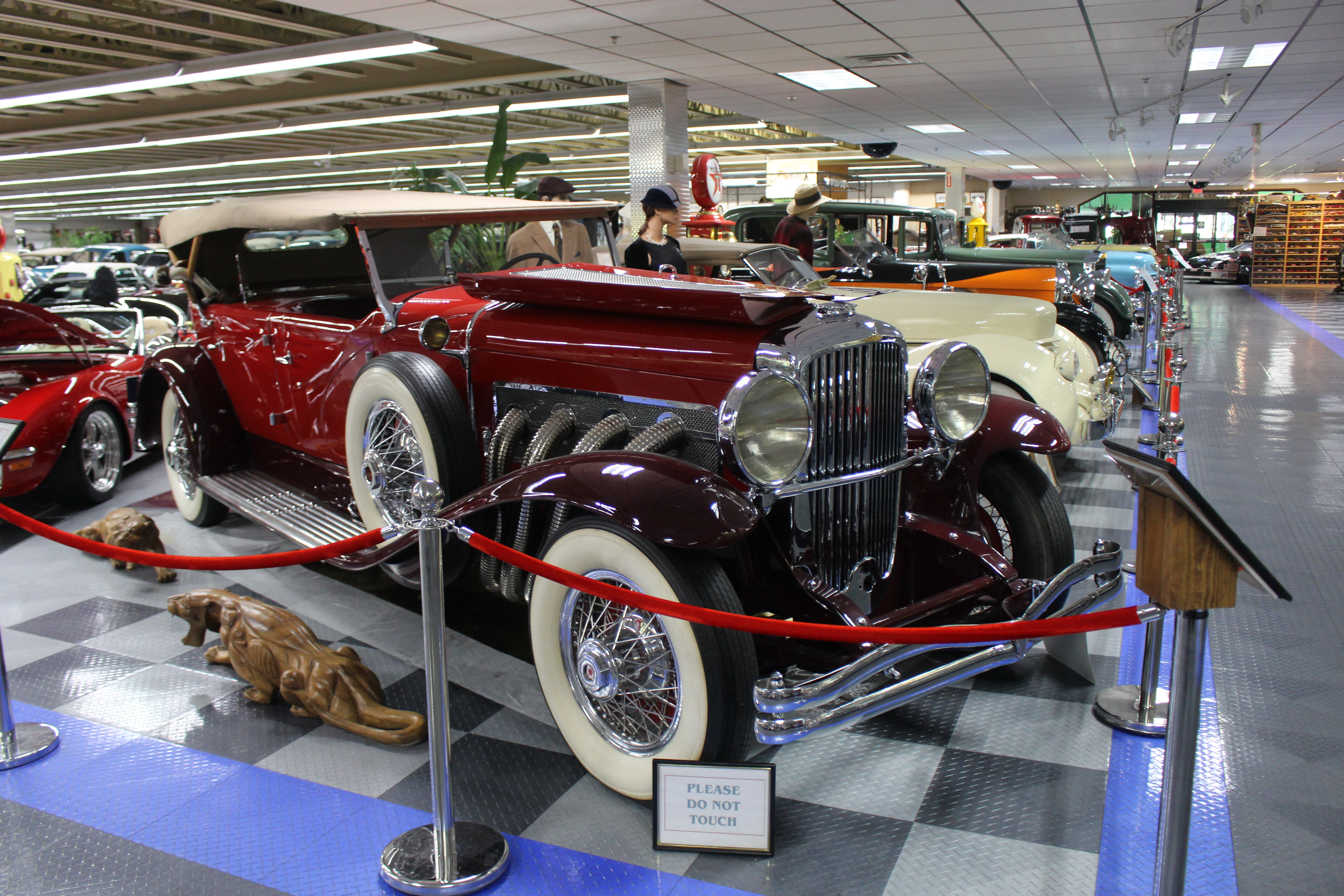
1931 Duesenberg Model J Dual Cowl Phaeton

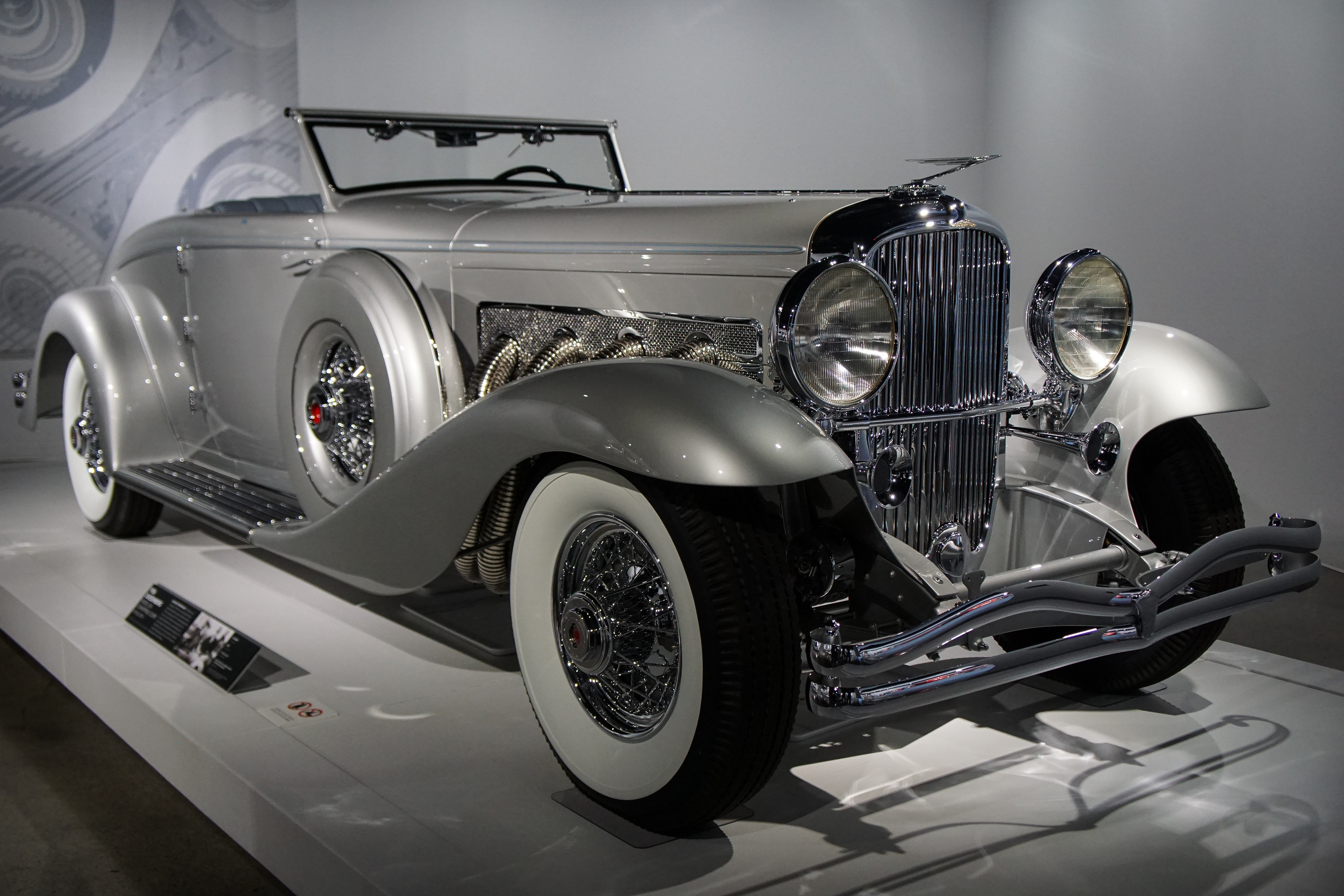
1936 Duesenberg Model SJN Convertible Coupe by Rollston & Company

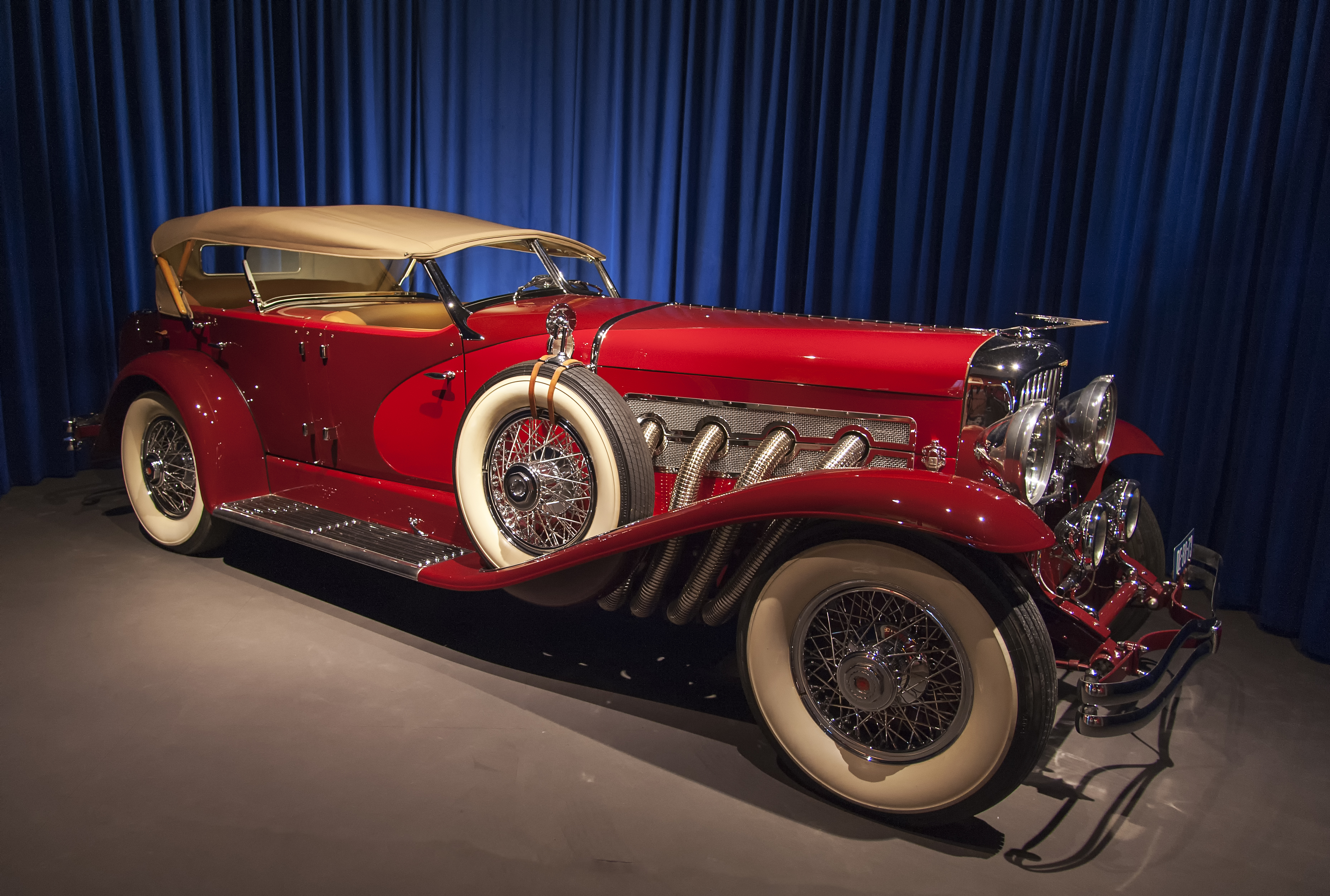
1935 SJ Walker-LaGrande Dual-Cowl Phaeton

=== Duesenberg Special ===
With financing from sponsors, Ab Jenkins commissioned the Duesenberg Special as a speed record car. It was built in 1935 on a supercharged Duesenberg Model J rolling chassis with a standard wheelbase, a modified front axle, and a non-standard high rear axle ratio. The engine was highly tuned by Augie Duesenberg. High performance parts developed for the Special, especially the "ram's horn" twin-carburetor inlet manifold, would be used on later supercharged Js. In October 1935, Jenkins drove the car to a one-hour record of 153.97 mph (247.79 km/h) and a twenty-four-hour record of 135.57 mph (218.18 km/h) at a circuit on the Bonneville Salt Flats. The 24-hour record would be held until 1961. The car was renamed "Mormon Meteor" after a Curtiss Conqueror aircraft engine was installed in place of the Duesenberg engine.

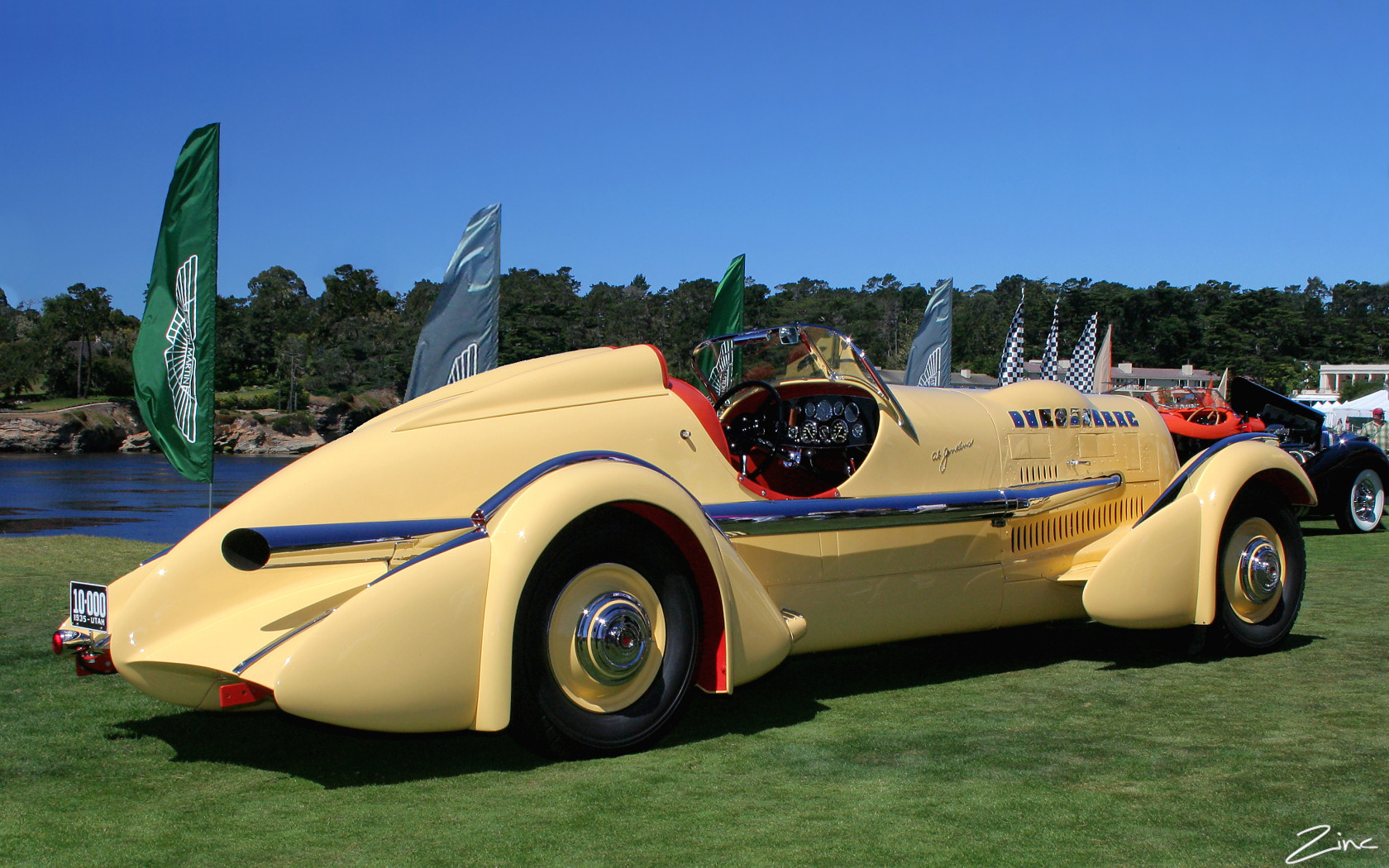
Duesenberg Special, a.k.a. Mormon Meteor

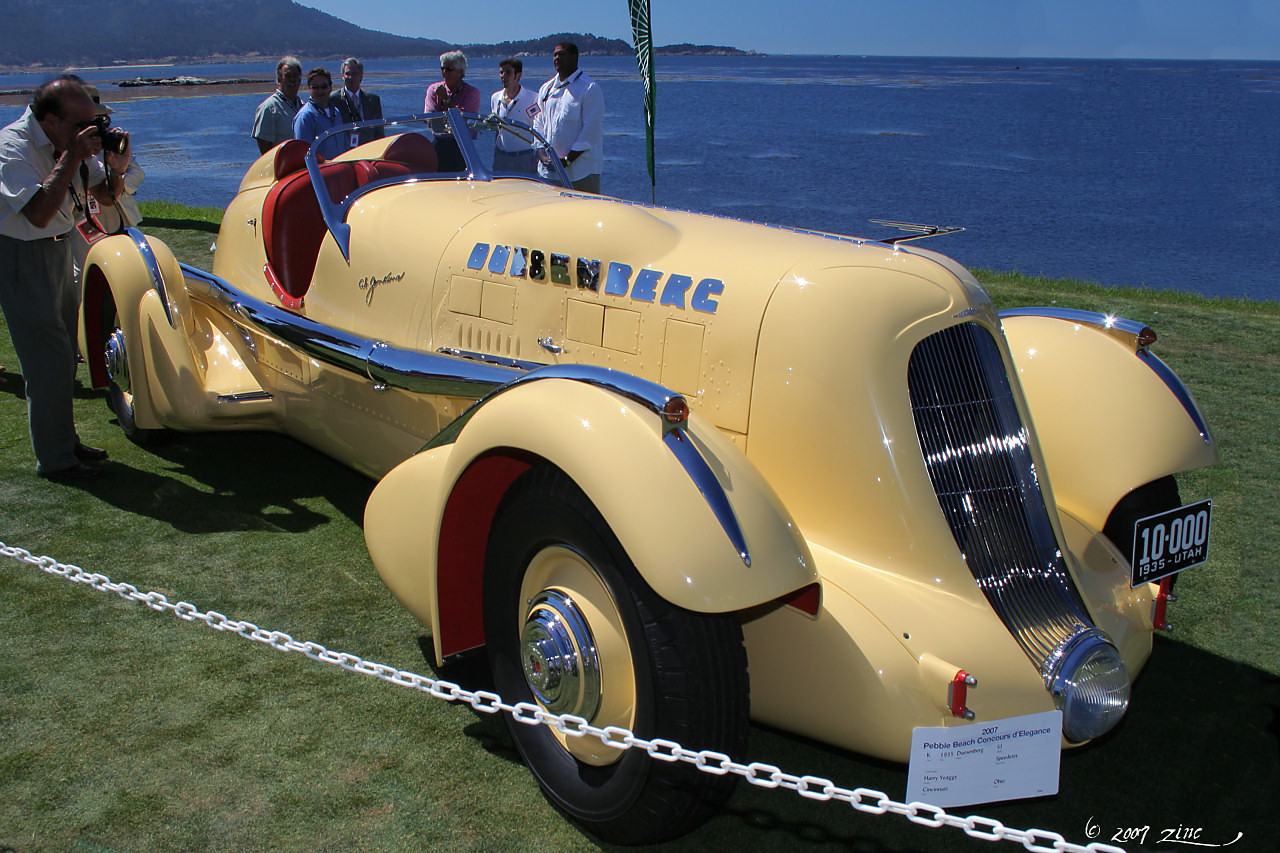
Duesenberg Special, a.k.a. Mormon Meteor

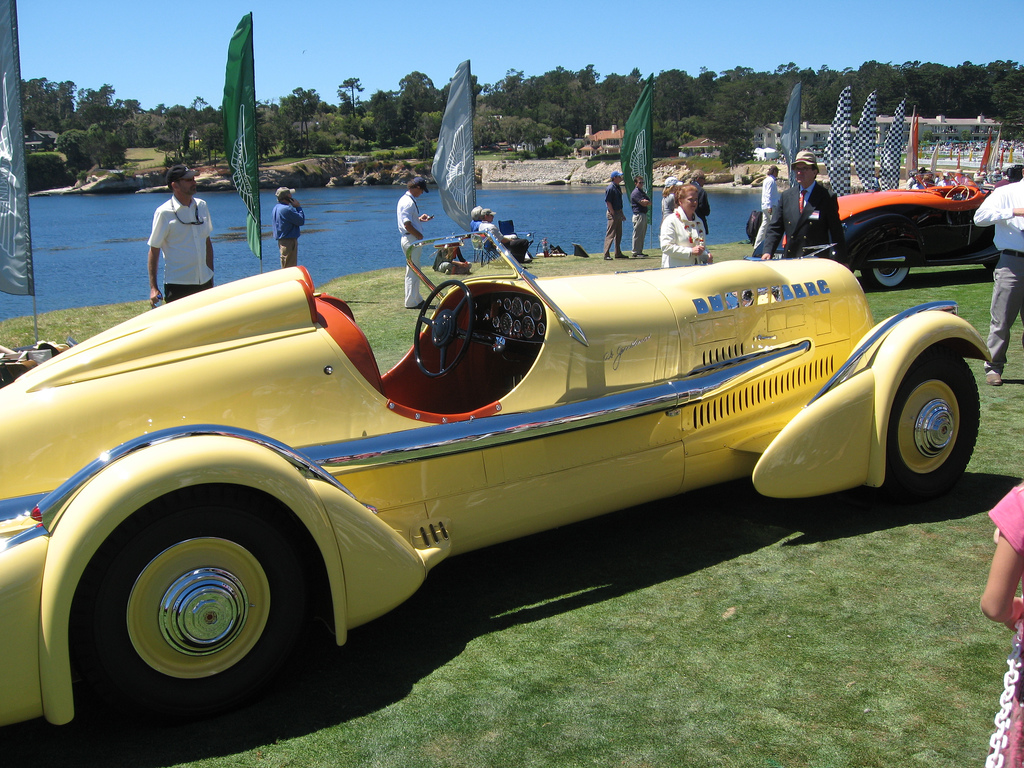
Duesenberg Special, a.k.a. Mormon Meteor

=== Twenty Grand ===
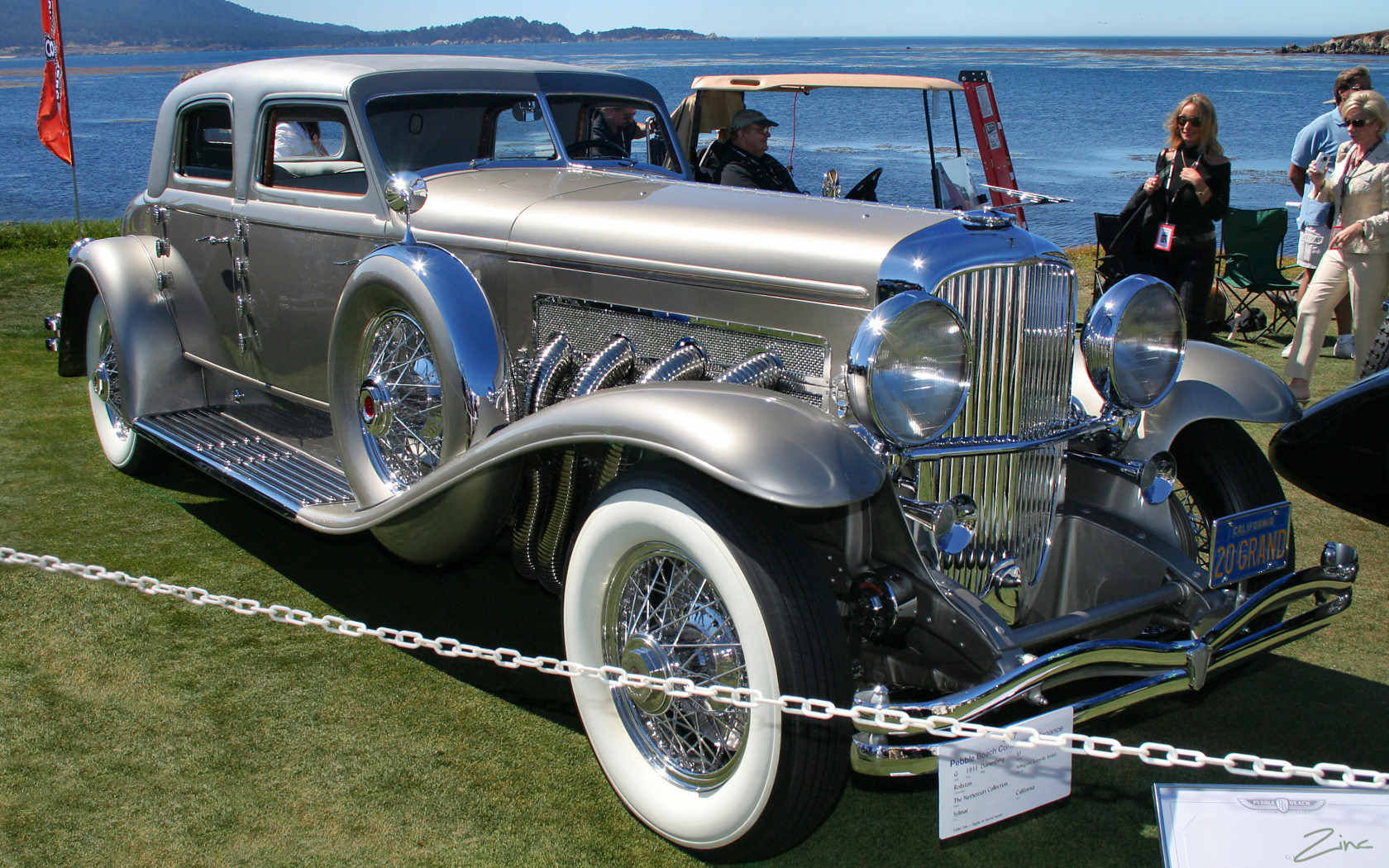
1933 Duesenberg SJ "Twenty Grand"

The one-off custom 1933 Rollston Arlington Torpedo-bodied Duesenberg SJ ultra-luxury sedan was the 2nd most expensive Duesenberg ever constructed and it is widely considered to be the most beautiful Duesenberg ever built. The Twenty Grand had a 320 horsepower supercharged DOHC engine and the car was built specifically for the "Dream Car" exhibition 1933 Century of Progress in Chicago. It is owned by the Nethercutt Collection.

=== SSJ ===
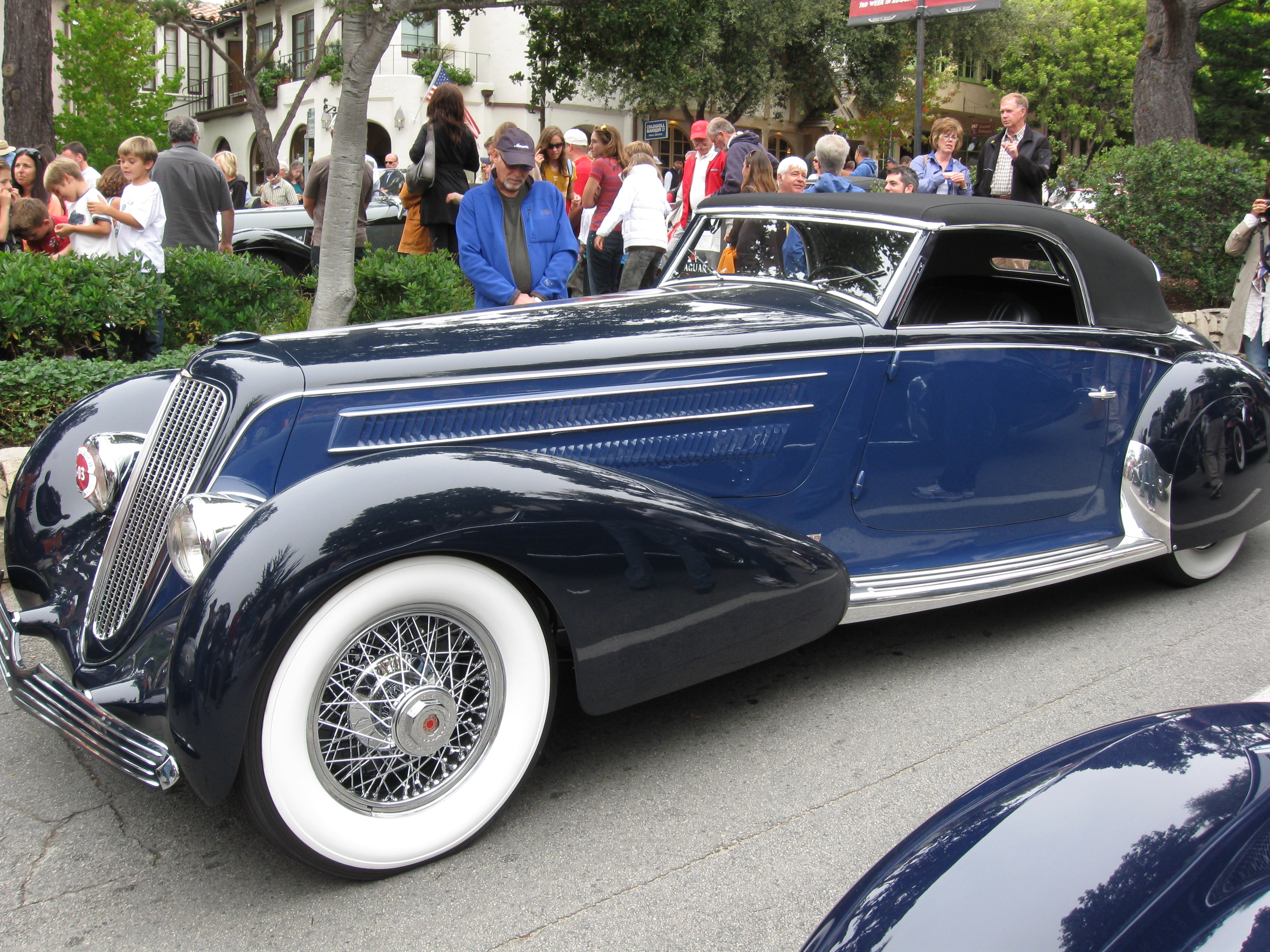
Duesenberg Model J cabriolet with a custom body by Graber

The short-wheelbase supercharged J, referred to by the public as the SSJ, had an extra-short wheelbase of 125 in (3,200 mm) and an engine delivering close to 400 hp (298 kW) through the use of the dual-carburetor "ram's horn" manifold developed for the Duesenberg Special. The "ram's horn" manifold has two branches, each of which splits into two more branches.

Only two were built; both had lightweight open-roadster bodies produced by Central Manufacturing Company, an Auburn subsidiary in Connersville, Indiana. At the rear, each short-wheelbase roadster had an external spare tire and smaller “later-style” round taillights.

The first short-wheelbase roadster was sold to the actor Gary Cooper in 1935. The other "SSJ" was lent by the company to actor and established Duesenberg customer Clark Gable in 1936. Cooper and Gable would race each other in the Hollywood Hills in these cars.

== JN ==
There is another version of the model J known as the Duesenberg JN (a name never used by the company either). All JNs were sold with Rollston coachwork and only 10 were produced in 1935. In an attempt to give a more modern look to an ageing design, the JN was equipped with smaller 17-inch-diameter wheels (versus 19 inches), skirted fenders, bullet-shaped taillights, and bodies set on the frame rails for a lower look. The battery box and tool box were redesigned slightly so that the doors could close over the frame. Supercharged JNs gained the logical SJN designation.

== Reception ==
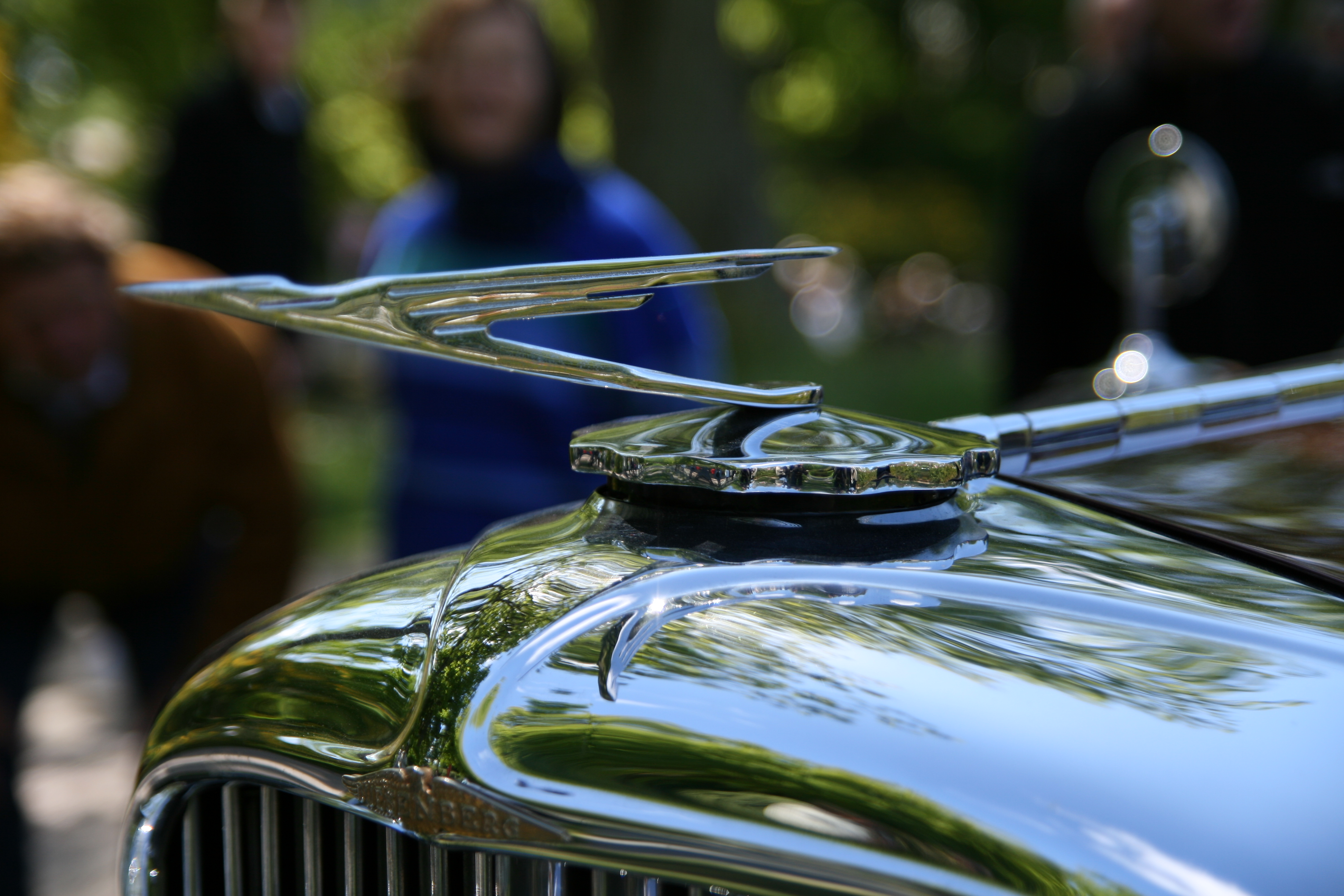
Duesenberg J hood ornament called "Duesenbird"

The Model J quickly became one of the most popular luxury cars as well as a status symbol in the United States and Europe, driven by the nobility; the rich and famous, among them Al Capone, Evalyn Walsh McLean, Greta Garbo, Ginger Rogers, Howard Hughes, Mae West, Marion Davies, Tyrone Power, Clark Gable, Bill "Bojangles" Robinson, William Randolph Hearst, the families Mars, Whitney, and Wrigley; members of European royalty such as the Duke of Windsor, Prince Nicholas of Romania, Queen Maria of Yugoslavia, and the Kings Victor Emmanuel III of Italy and Alfonso XIII of Spain. The last was very keen on motoring and chose his now missing Duesenberg J, among his cars, to go to exile after the proclamation of the Second Spanish Republic. Father Divine had the last Duesenberg chassis built with an extra-long 178-inch wheelbase. It weighed 7,800 lb (3,500 kg) and accommodated ten passengers. J. Herbert Newport was the designer. Built by Bohman & Schwartz and delivered in October 1937, it was 22 ft (6.7 m) long and 7 ft (2.1 m) wide. It was known as Father Divine's Throne Car because it had a removable rear top section that exposed two raised rear seats.

Originally, New York City supported the Model J. It was the financial capital of the United States in 1929, and many of its people could afford such an expensive car. As the Depression deepened, however, power shifted, and ultimately it was newly wealthy Hollywood that kept Duesenberg alive through much of the 1930s. It was so reputed and imposing that many Hollywood stars, such as James Cagney, posed next to the car to promote their careers.

There was a gradual evolution (up to the 1937 model) to preserve the "stately lines" while moving into a more integrated mode of styling. The final evolution of the Duesenberg engine was ram-air intakes, which were added to some of the last supercharged models to produce 400 hp (298 kW), referred to as "SSJ". Of the 481 Model Js (including all its versions) produced between 1928 and 1937, about 378 survive. Some are speculated to have been lost in the war, particularly those exported to Europe, while others may had been parted out or even altered beyond recognition during the late 1940s and early 1950s.

== Legacy ==
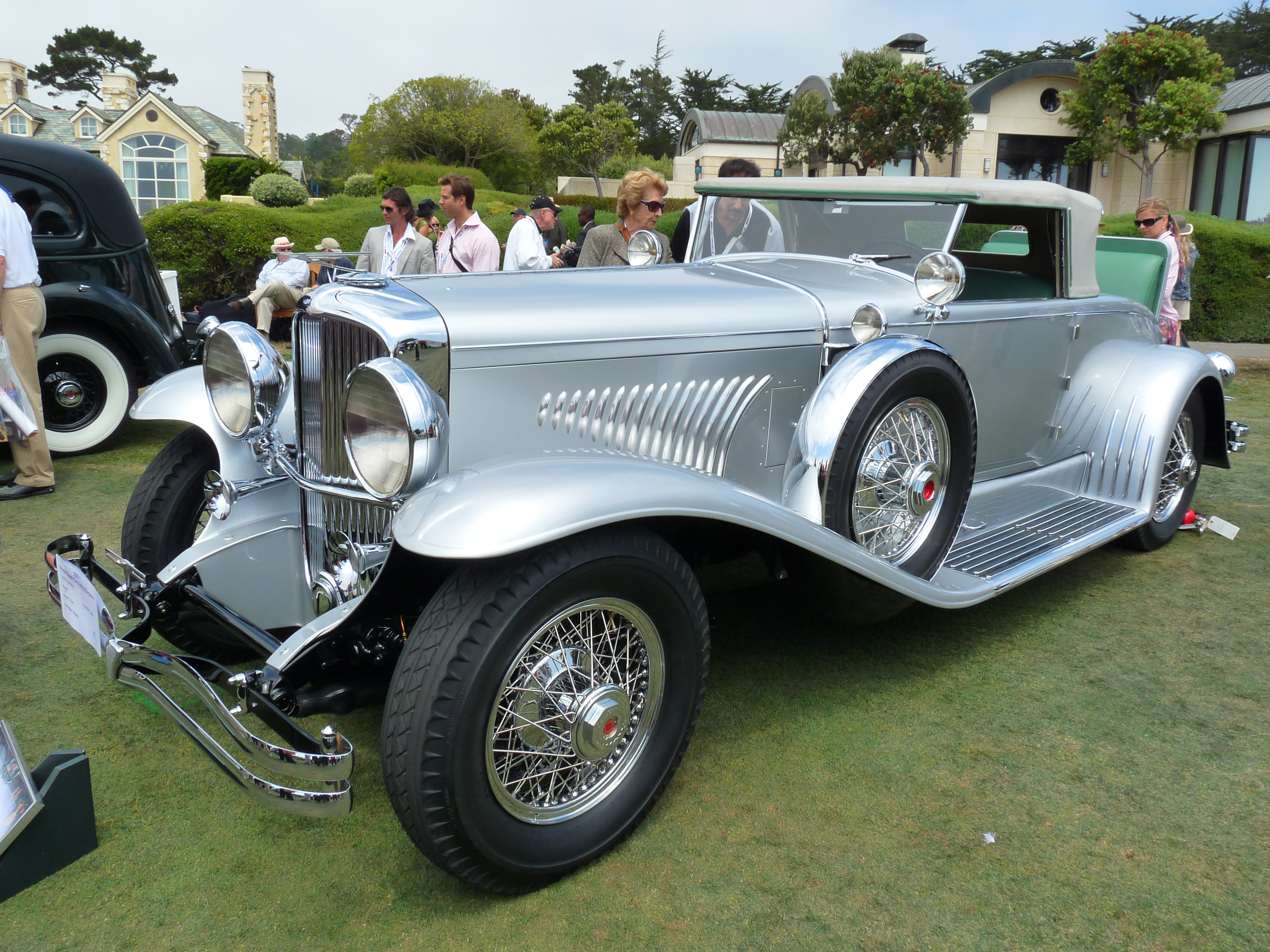
1929 Duesenberg J Murphy Convertible Coupe

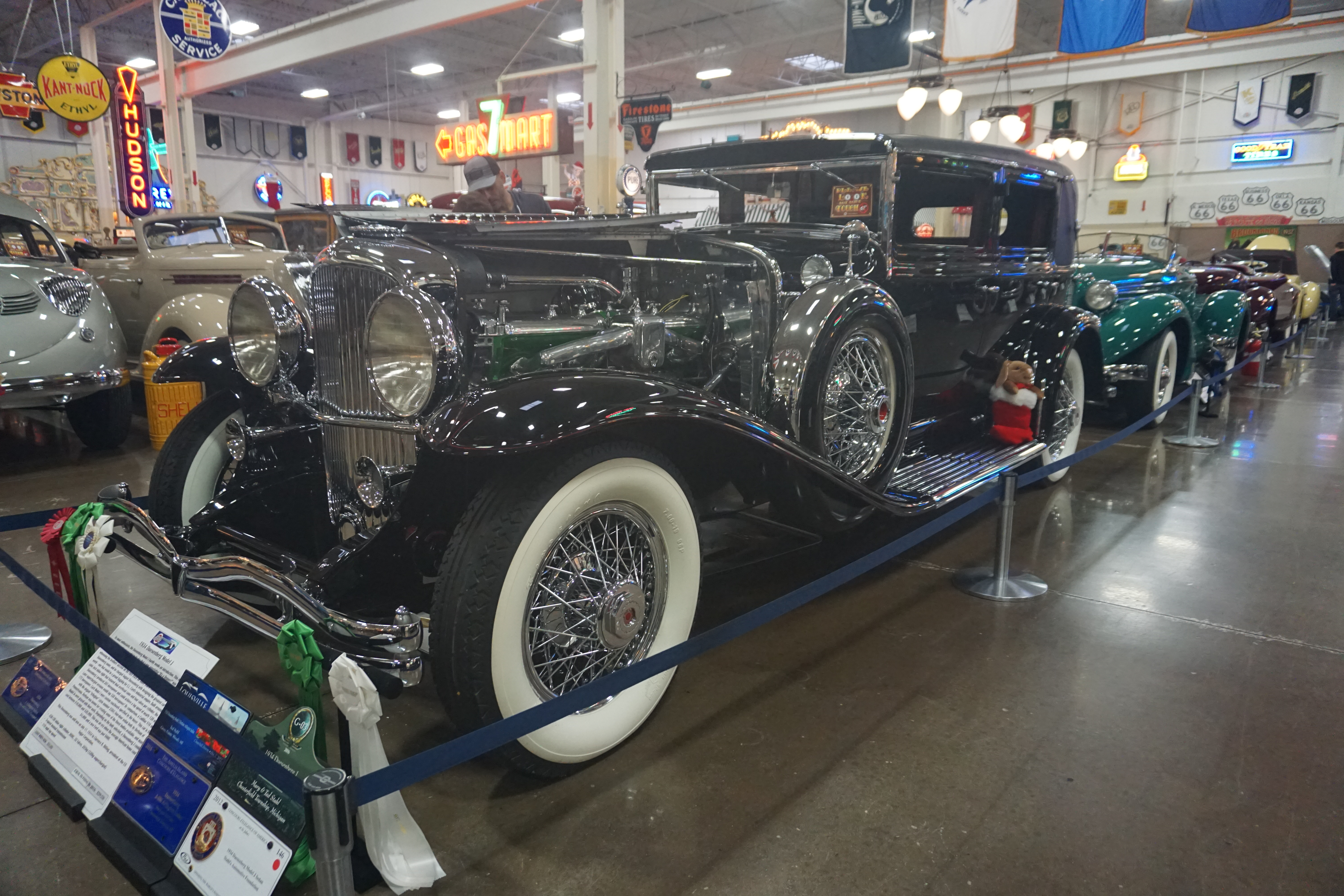
1934 Duesenberg Model J at Stahls Automotive Collection

Duesenberg ceased production in 1937 after Cord's financial empire collapsed. However, two more Duesenbergs were completed between 1937 and 1940. The first one was delivered by the coachbuilder Rollson to the German artist Rudolf Bauer in April 1940; it is both the longest Duesenberg and the last one delivered. The last one ever made was assembled from leftover parts between 1938 and 1940.

Duesenberg became far less popular during World War II, and by 1941 to 1942, used specimens were abundant and cheap, with advertised prices averaging around $700 ($13,793 in 2025 dollars) for the cars in excellent condition. Even still, a few used Model Js were advertised for around $300 to $400, with some ultimately selling for only $100 or $200.

Business rebounded in the 1950s, when classic and vintage cars became popular among collectors. Several Model Js were advertised in The New York Times in the fall of 1950, at prices as low as $500, though an exceptional restored example could exceed $2,000 ($26,763 in 2025 dollars) which was still within the reach of the average working American.

By 1959, a decent example could not be bought for less than $4,000, and an exceptionally fine specimen could approach $10,000 ($110,445 in 2025 dollars). A record price of $12,000 had been paid for a Duesenberg J in a private sale that year. In 10 years' time, by 1969, a Model J could fetch anywhere between $20,000 and $75,000 ($658,462 in 2025 dollars). A record price of $205,000 ($1,338,310 in 2025 dollars) was set at an auction in 1974 for a model J, surpassing Adolf Hitler's personal Mercedes-Benz 770, which sold for $153,000 the year prior.

The Duesenberg Special, a.k.a. "Mormon Meteor", was sold at an auction by Gooding & Co. in August 2004 for $4.5 million. Another SJ sold for $4.4 million at RM Auctions in Monterey, California, in 2007.

Liberace used a replica Duesenberg SJ encrusted with Austrian rhinestone crystals during his stage performances. The vehicle later went on to be exhibited at the Liberace Museum in Las Vegas, Nevada, and at The Cosmopolitan of Las Vegas, and its current location is at the "Liberace Garage" located in Las Vegas as well.

In 2018, a Duesenberg SSJ that was formerly owned by Gary Cooper was sold at auction for $22 million. This made it the most expensive American car ever sold.

== See also ==
- Timeline of most powerful production cars
