= Walter M. Murphy Company =

Defunct American motor vehicle body manufacturer

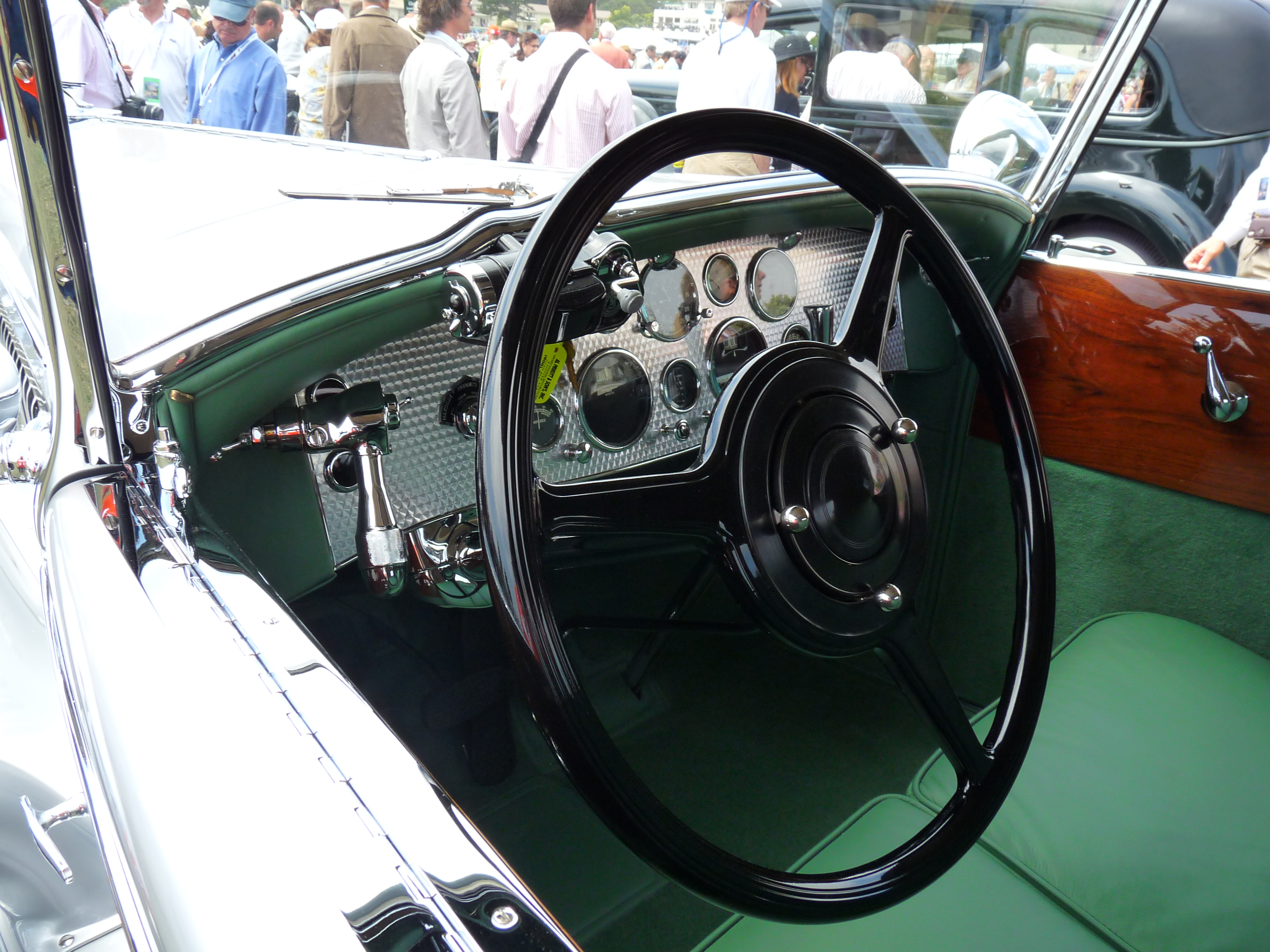
1929 Murphy convertible coupé on a Duesenberg J chassis

Walter M Murphy Company was an automobile coachbuilder which operated in Colorado Street, Pasadena, California. Founded in 1922, its business ended in 1932. Employees Bohman & Schwartz set up a new business in different premises and took over remaining regular customers.

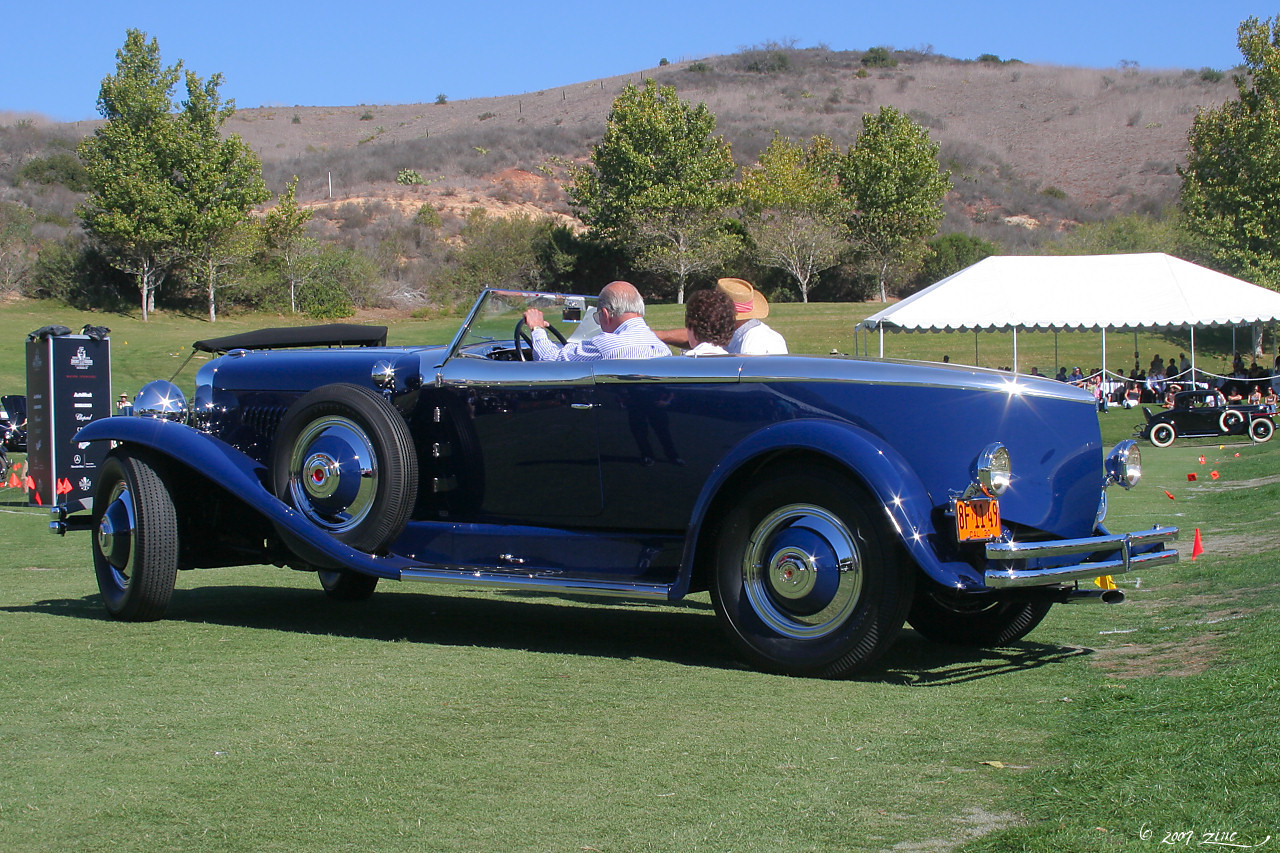
Disappearing top torpedo by Murphy on a 1930 Duesenberg J chassis
