= Mormon Meteor =

Duesenberg Special / Mormon Meteor
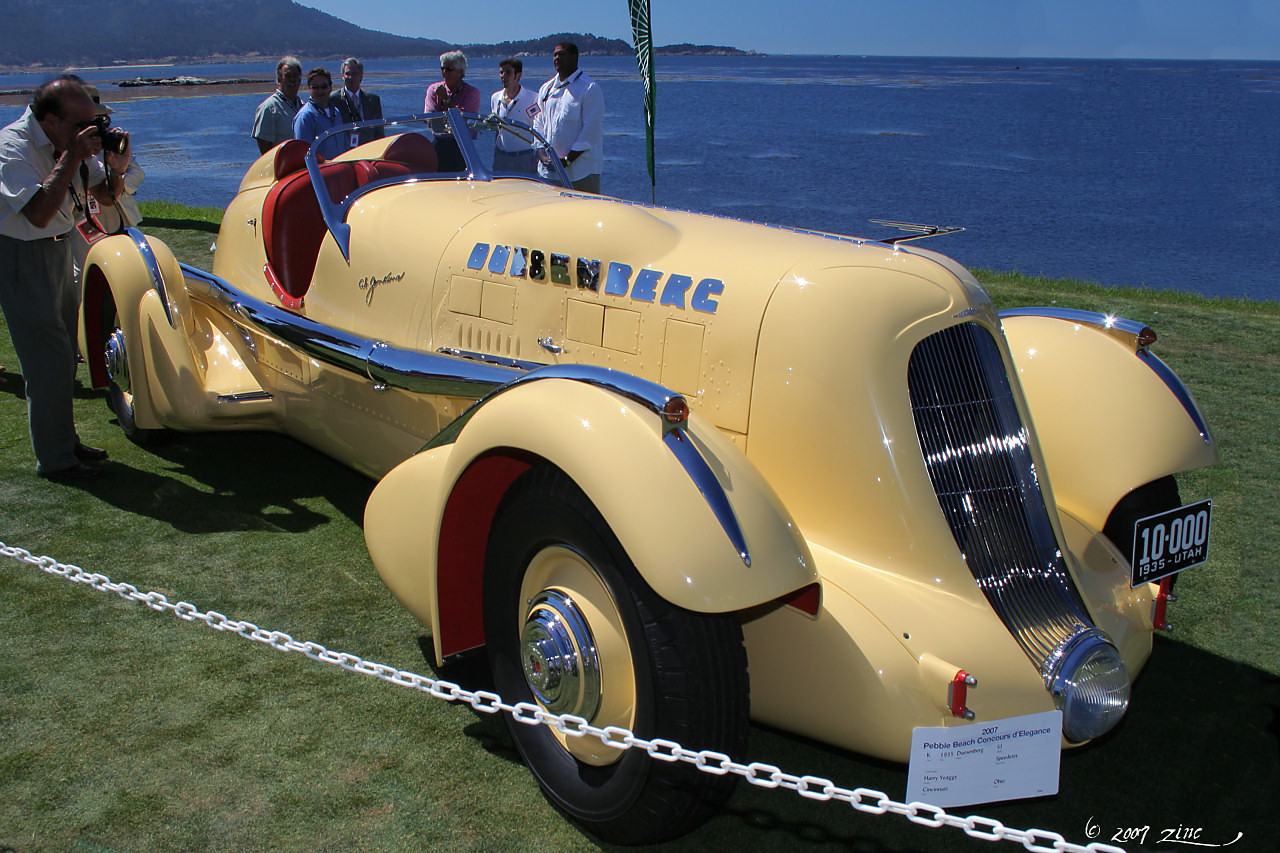

Overview
- Designer: J. Herbert Newport

Body and chassis
- Layout: FR

Powertrain
- Engine: Duesenberg Special: 420 cu in (7 L) 400 hp (298 kW) I8; Mormon Meteor: 1,570 cu in (26 L) Curtiss Conqueror 750 hp (559 kW) V12
- Transmission: 3-speed manual

Dimensions
- Wheelbase: 142.5 in (3,620 mm)

The Mormon Meteor I and III were two race cars built in the 1930s by American driver Ab Jenkins. They were customized Duesenberg cars, and set several land speed records.

== Duesenberg Special ==
The Duesenberg Special was a one-off speed record car. It was built in 1935 on a supercharged Duesenberg Model J rolling chassis with a standard wheelbase of 142.5 in (3,620 mm), a dropped front axle, 18 in (457 mm) wheels instead of the standard 19 in (483 mm) wheels, and a non-standard 3:1 rear axle ratio. The engine was highly tuned by August Duesenberg, with the compression ratio raised to 7.5:1 and different engine bearings being used. High performance parts developed for the Special, especially the "ram's horn" twin-carburetor inlet manifold, would be used on later supercharged Js (or "SJ"s as they were called by the public).

Financing for the Duesenberg Special came from sponsorship solicited by Ab Jenkins from oil companies and accessory manufacturers and distributors. Jenkins guaranteed his sponsors that he would break established speed records with the car. He delivered on his guarantee in October 1935, when he set a one-hour record of 153.97 mph (247.79 km/h) and a twenty-four-hour record of 135.57 mph (218.18 km/h) at a circuit on the Bonneville Salt Flats. The 24-hour record would be held until 1961.

== Mormon Meteor ==
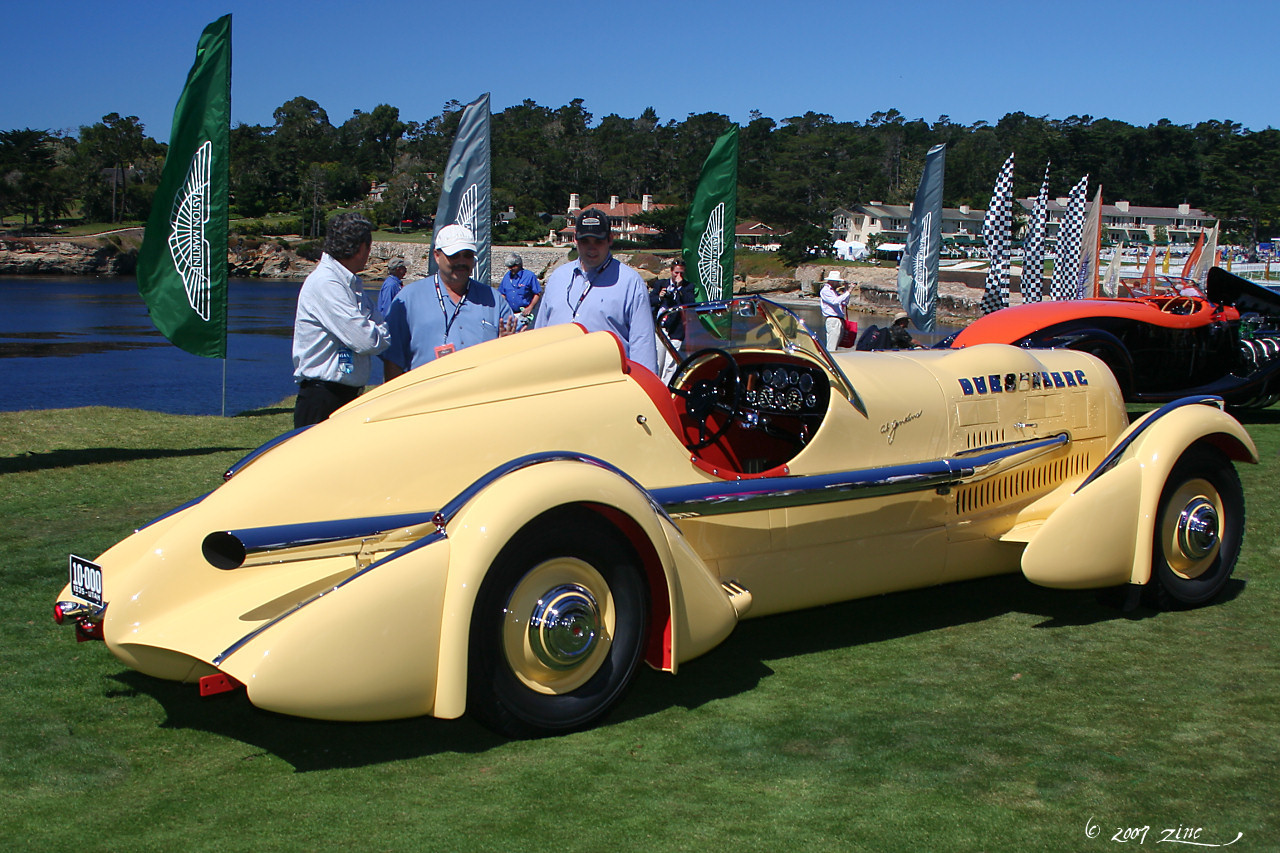
Rear view

In search of higher speed records, Jenkins had the Duesenberg Special modified by replacing the Duesenberg engine with a Curtiss Conqueror aircraft engine. August Duesenberg designed new parts to connect the aircraft engine to the car's drivetrain. Work on the car was supervised by August Duesenberg and done largely by him and by Ab Jenkins' son Marvin.

This version of the car was named Mormon Meteor and Ab Jenkins began breaking records with it in 1936, beginning with a 500 km (311 mi) record of 164.47 mph (264.69 km/h). Jenkins and Babe Stapp drove the car to a 24-hour average of 153.82 mph (247.55 km/h) and a 48-hour average of 148.64 mph (239.21 km/h). In 1937, Jenkins and Louis Meyer increased the car's 24-hour record to 157.27 mph (253.10 km/h).

The combination of the V12 aircraft engine and the almost stock Duesenberg chassis caused understeer at high speed. Jenkins had August Duesenberg, now an independent engineer after the closure of Duesenberg Inc., design and build a new chassis to contain the aircraft engine. After the aircraft engine was removed from the Mormon Meteor in 1938, the car was restored to Duesenberg Special specifications, the body was modified for road use, and the car was driven by Ab and Marv Jenkins on the streets for about 20,000 mi (32,000 km) until 1943.

The car was kept in street form until 2004. That year, the family that had owned it since 1959 had it sold at Gooding & Company's Pebble Beach Auction. The new owner had the car restored to its 1935 racing condition and entered it in the 2007 Pebble Beach Concours d'Elegance, which it won. It won the 2023 Las Vegas Concours d'Elegance at the Wynn Las Vegas.

=== Naming convention ===
The car was known in its original form as the "Duesenberg Special". After the aircraft engine was installed, the Deseret News held a contest to name the car. The winning name of "Mormon Meteor" was announced on August 1, 1936. Although the term "Mormon Meteor" refers to the car in aircraft-engined form, the car was still referred to as the Mormon Meteor after its original Duesenberg drivetrain was replaced. This has resulted in the Duesenberg Special being referred to as "Mormon Meteor I" and the actual Mormon Meteor being referred to as "Mormon Meteor II".

== Mormon Meteor III ==
Mormon Meteor III

Body and chassis
- Layout: FR

Powertrain
- Engine: 1,570 cu in (26 L) Curtiss Conqueror 750 hp (559 kW) V12
- Transmission: 3-speed manual

Dimensions
- Wheelbase: 156 in (3,962 mm)

The Mormon Meteor III was built in 1937 to handle the large Curtiss Conqueror airplane engine. It was built by both Ab's son Marv Jenkins and Augie Dusenberg. Ab sent Marv to build the car with Dusenberg at only age 17. This intimate knowledge of the Meteor III enabled Marv to complete the meticulous restoration that required most parts to be fabricated again from scratch many years later after his father Ab's passing. It had many unique features, such as the body offset by six inches on the frame to help the car turn on the track. In 1939, Jenkins drove the car 171 mph (275 km/h) and broke all of the 12-hour endurance records. The Mormon Meteor III set a 24-hour record of 161.180 mph (259.394 km/h) in 1940 that would not be broken until 1990. The car is permanently displayed at the Museum of Utah in Salt Lake City.
