= Walker Body Company Factory =

- U.S. National Register of Historic Places
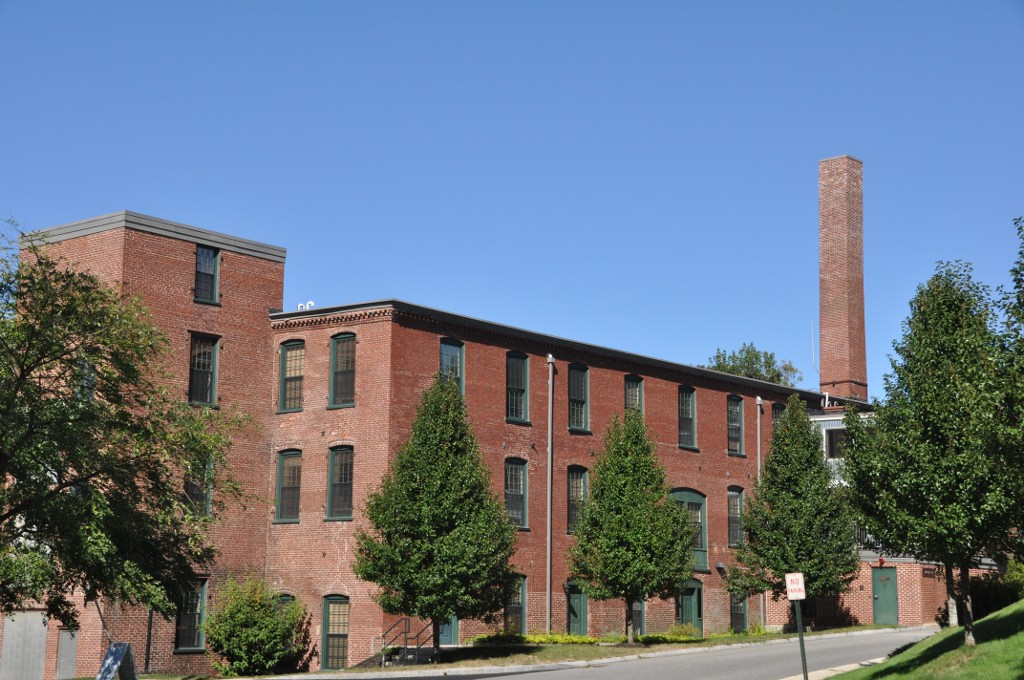

- Location within Massachusetts Location within the United States
- Location: Amesbury, Massachusetts
- Coordinates: 42.85246°N 70.92379°W
- Architect: Morse & Dickinson
- NRHP reference No.: 07000512
- Added to NRHP: September 28, 2007

The Walker Body Company Factory is a historic factory complex on Oak Street at River Court in Amesbury, Massachusetts. It has been converted to residential use.

The Walker Body Company, originally the Walker Carriage Manufacturing Company, was a major manufacturing concern in Amesbury during the late 19th and early 20th century. Its factory was located in an area known as "Carriage Hill" due to the large number of carriage builders in the area. Two of its buildings survive: mill #2, a c. 1885 structure built by the Hume Carriage Company, and mill #3, built in 1918 and expanded in 1929. The older building is a three-story brick structure, while the newer one is a wood-frame building designed by the Beverly, Massachusetts firm of Morse & Dickinson. Its wooden construction is unusual in that typical factory construction of the time usually involved brick or other firesafe materials.

The complex was listed on the National Register of Historic Places in 2007.

== See also ==
- National Register of Historic Places listings in Essex County, Massachusetts
