= Derham Body Company =

Defunct American motor vehicle body manufacturer

Derham Body Company of Philadelphia was a custom coachbuilding company founded by Irish wheelwright Joseph Derham (1865–1928) in 1887 to make carriages. As automobiles became more popular their clientele asked Derham to provide bodies for their cars. It was claimed only New York's Brewster had a similar reputation.

Following World War II Derham's business steadily declined. Most competitors had already been destroyed by the Great Depression. After the retirement of the last of the founder's sons in 1971 the entire premises were used as a Porsche-Audi and Ferrari dealership.

== Carriages ==
Derham's Landaus, Victorias, Meadowbrooks, Phaetons and Broughams were much in demand by Philadelphia's élite. Their requirements changed to automobile bodies.

== Automobile bodies ==
To cope with the increased activity Derham required larger premises so a purpose-built plant was erected in Rosemont, Pennsylvania where many of their customers lived.

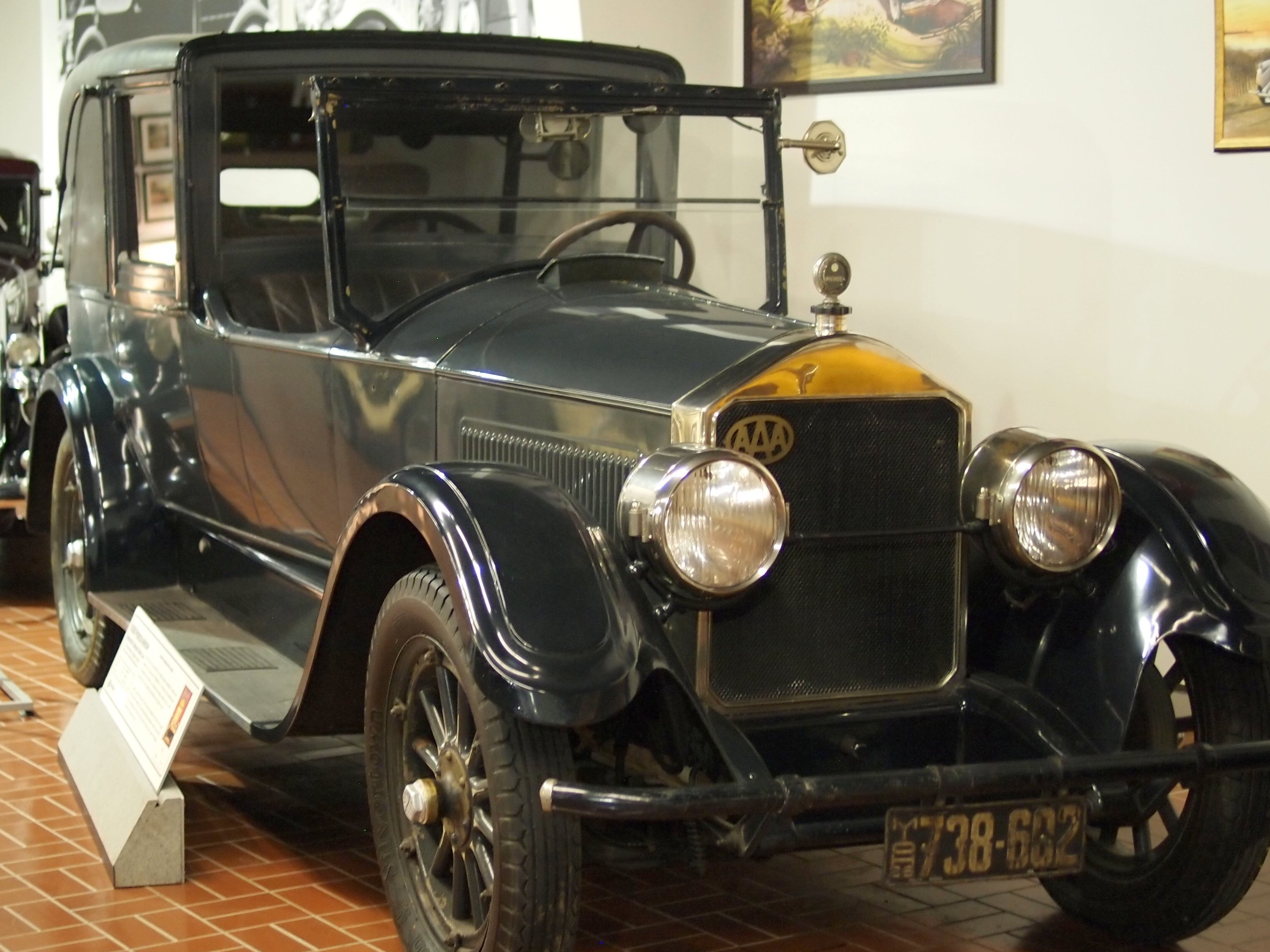
1926 Pierce-Arrow Series 80 town car

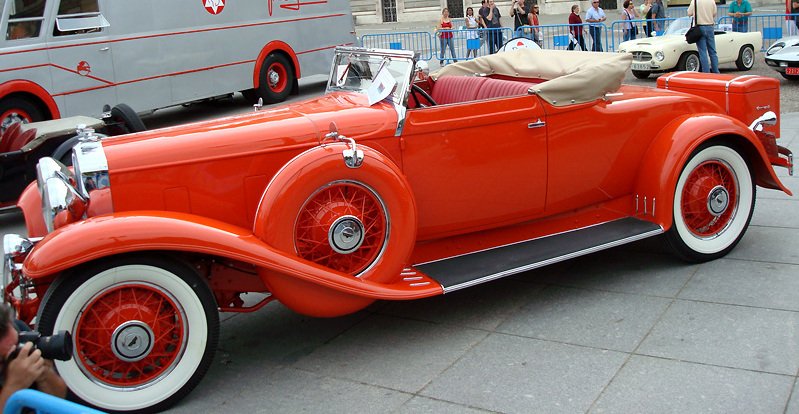
1932 Stutz S-V16

=== Custom bodies ===
Derham always made one-off custom bodies but they were financially stabilised by taking on regular series production work.

=== Semi-custom bodies ===
From early on dealers would order more than one body of a particular design and this cost-saving practice grew to become short production runs of perhaps 20 or more identical automobiles.

Cars made before the 1930s were mostly formal and intended to be chauffeur-driven but by the end of the 1920s Derham was making attractive convertibles and they became the bulk of production.

Derham developed their own distinctive automobile body style. Most of their bodies were built in series on Packards and Hudsons but they continued to build one-off cars on any chassis their customer required.

During the 1930s Derham survived by building some bodies on Ford V8s and by taking on a Plymouth - De Soto dealership. Once war began they moved to building mobile canteens for Philadelphia's shipyards. Aircraft components were added to their productions line.

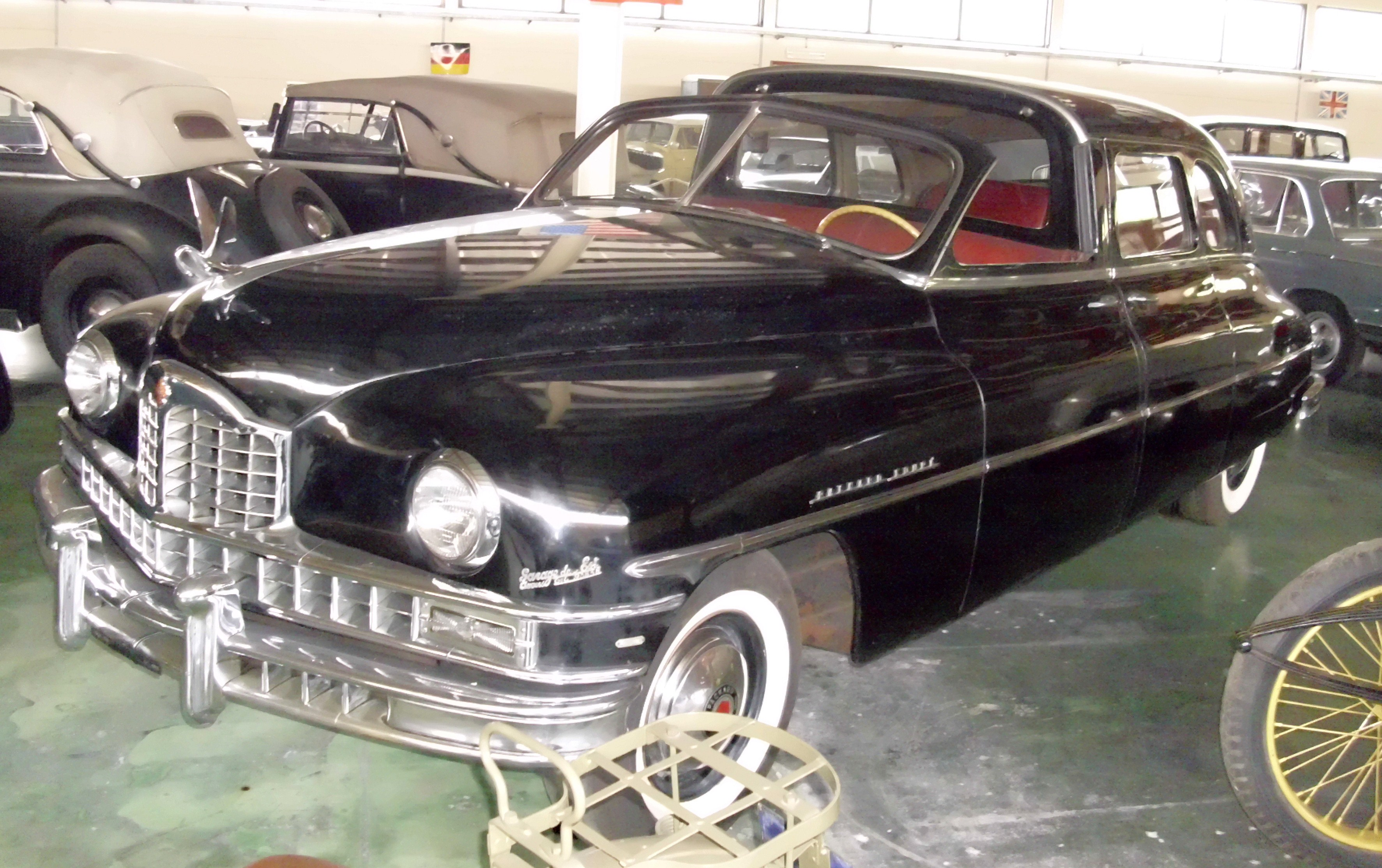
1949 Packard Super Eight town car

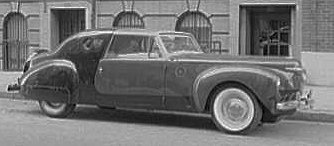
1946 body on a 1941 Lincoln Continental convertible for and designed by Raymond Loewy

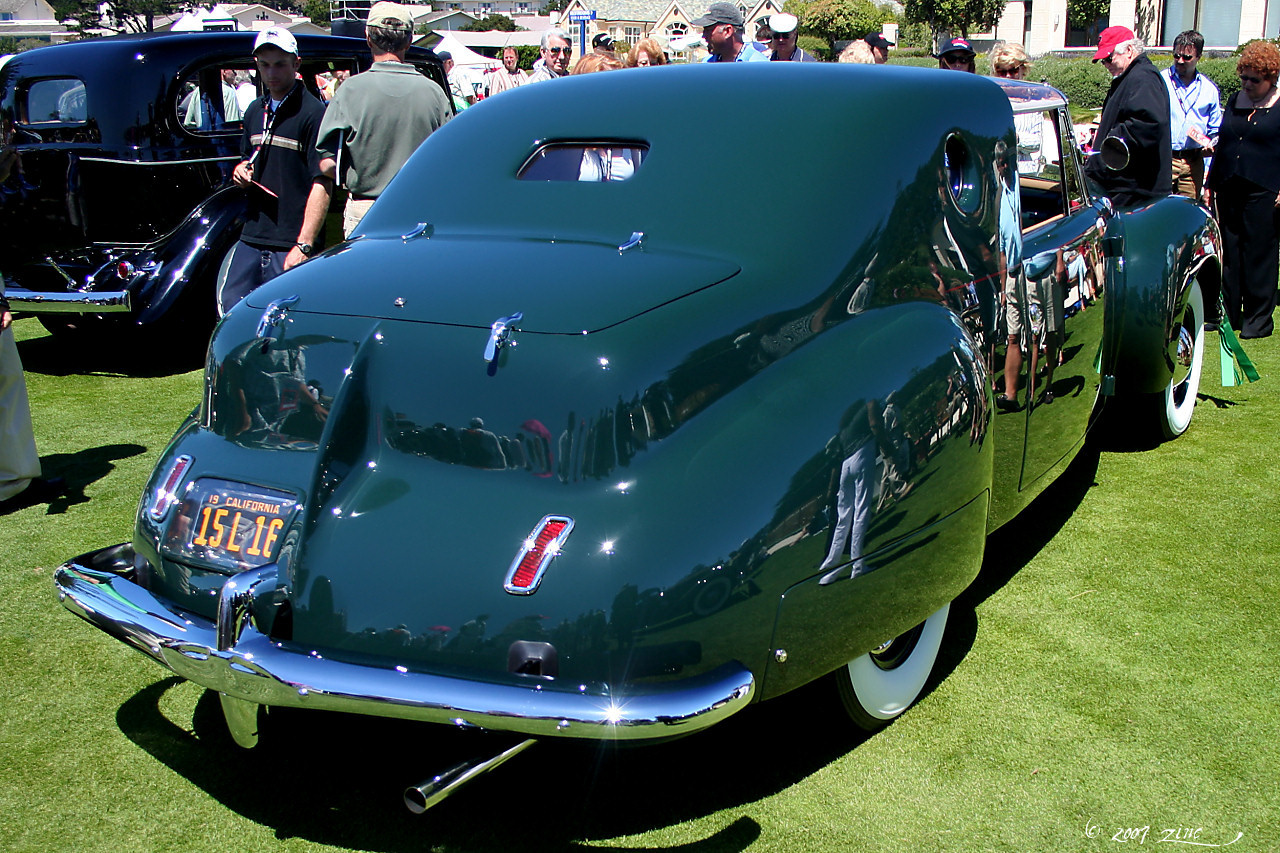
The same car in 2007 without the rear spare and with an altered grille

To combat cost increases Derham took to amending standard sedan bodies making them into limousines and also changing appearance by fixing soft padding over the standard sedan's top. Most of the standard structure remained intact. This allowed Derham to survive into the postwar period.

Business Week wrote about Derham Body in their April 22, 1950 issue. Derham reprinted it listing some current and former clients: Raymond Loewy, Pope Pius XII, Cardinal Spellman, Duke of Windsor, Harry Truman, Cole Porter, Gary Cooper, Louis B Mayer, James Forrestal, Herbert Pulitzer, Lily Pons, Leopold Stokowski, Bernard Baruch, Rodman Wanamaker and Marjorie Merriweather Post Davies.

During 1956 Derham built a prototype Lincoln Continental Mark II convertible but Ford's project did not result in any more cars.

== Garthwaite ==
The Derham business and its building were sold to Albert A. Garthwaite (Lee Tire and Rubber heir) in 1964 when business had been reduced to armoring Cadillac and Lincoln limousines and restoration of classic cars.

== Floyd-Derham ==
Disagreements after the founder's death led to one of his sons going out on his own with William Floyd, a European car importer. Floyd-Derham exhibited for the first time in the fall of 1928. The onset of the depression led Floyd to pull out of the partnership and Philip Derham began to work for Duesenberg.

The Derham archives are kept by the Classic Car Club of America.
