= Walker Body Company =

The Walker Body Company, a former carriage manufacturer based in Amesbury, Massachusetts, began manufacturing metal automobile bodies in 1911. It went bankrupt in 1930. The manufacturing site remains as the Walker Body Company Factory.

== History ==
In 1911, James Walker teamed up with Harlan P. Wells and incorporated autobody manufacturer Walker-Wells Body Co. An early major customer was Franklin Automobile Company of Syracuse, New York. James Walker was son of Scottish immigrant George T. Walker, Sr., founder in 1898 of carriage manufacturer Walker Carriage Company, and before that partner in other carriage manufacturing businesses.

Between 1914 and 1919 half of the company's production went to Franklin Co. The remaining orders were divided among the Buick, Paige, Holmes (Canton, Ohio), Jackson, Jordan, Lexington, Packard, REO and White.

== Demise ==
The company went bankrupt in 1930 following the precipitous decline in demand for luxury automobiles after the Stock Market Crash of 1929, along with all the other Amesbury, Massachusetts auto body manufacturers.
