= Duesenberg Model X =

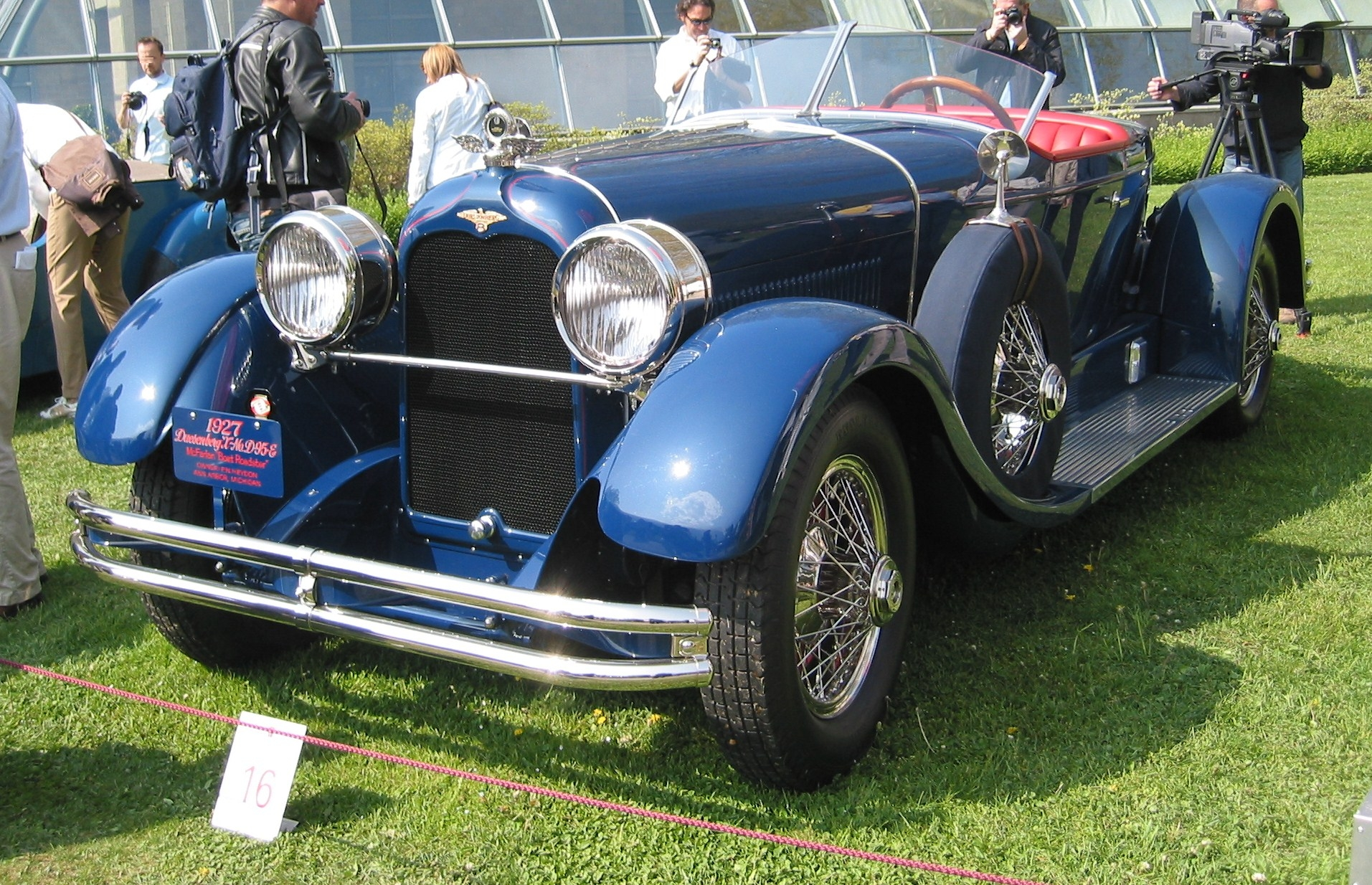
- 1927 Duesenberg Model X McFarlan speedster Runabout

Overview
- Manufacturer: Duesenberg
- Production: 1926–1927; 13 produced
- Assembly: Indianapolis, Indiana, United States
- Designer: Fred and August Duesenberg

Body and chassis
- Class: Luxury car
- Body style: Coachbuilt to owner's preference
- Layout: FR
- Related: Duesenberg Model A

Powertrain
- Engine: 4.3 L (260 cu in) OHC straight-eight engine
- Transmission: 3 speed manual

Dimensions
- Wheelbase: 3,454.4 mm (136 in)

Chronology
- Predecessor: Duesenberg Model A
- Successor: Duesenberg Model J

Duesenberg Straight 8

Overview
- Manufacturer: Duesenberg
- Production: 1926–1927

Layout
- Configuration: straight-eight engine
- Displacement: 4.3 L (260 cu in)
- Cylinder bore: 73.0 mm (2.875 in)
- Piston stroke: 127.0 mm (5.0 in)
- Cylinder block material: cast iron, 3 bearings
- Cylinder head material: cast iron, detachable
- Valvetrain: Shaft-driven SOHC, 2 valves/cyl.
- Compression ratio: 5:1

Combustion
- Fuel system: Single updraft Schebler 1 1/2 in carburetor
- Management: Delco coil and points, distributor mounted at end of starter/generator unit
- Fuel type: Gasoline
- Oil system: Wet sump, full pressure lubrication
- Cooling system: water cooled

Output
- Power output: 100 bhp (75 kW) @ 3600 rpm
- Torque output: 170 lb⋅ft (230 N⋅m) at 1500 rpm

Chronology
- Successor: Duesenberg Model J

The Duesenberg Model X is a luxury car made by the American manufacturer Duesenberg, an improved version of its previous Model A. It had an improved version of the company's previous 260 cu in (4.3 L) inline 8 SOHC 16-valve Duesenberg Straight Eight, which delivered 100 hp (75 kW) and a 100 mph (160 km/h) top speed).

It was produced as a 131 in (3,300 mm) rolling chassis with hydraulic four-wheel brakes. Only about 13 were turned out between 1926 and 1927.

== Background ==
Duesenberg was founded by brothers Fred and August Duesenberg, and initially gained fame through motorsport, including victories at the Indianapolis 500 and the 1921 French Grand Prix. The company entered receivership in 1924 amid financial difficulties but was acquired in 1926 by Errett Lobban Cord, who sought to reposition Duesenberg as a premier American luxury marque.

The Model X was developed in 1925 as an upgraded, performance-oriented derivative of the Model A (produced 1921–1927). It featured a reengineered chassis and powertrain intended to offer greater speed and refinement while retaining the straight eight engine architecture that had become a Duesenberg hallmark. Production was extremely limited, with rolling chassis supplied to coachbuilders for custom bodies, including by Locke & Company and McFarlan.

The model was exhibited at major auto salons, such as the 1927 New York and Chicago shows, in an effort to generate interest among wealthy clientele. By late 1927, Cord shifted focus toward a more ambitious and imposing flagship, the Model J, which featured a larger engine, greater power, and even more extravagant coachwork. As a result, the Model X program was curtailed, and some unfinished X chassis were repurposed or destroyed during the transition.

The Model X is often viewed as a bridge between Duesenberg's early production efforts and its peak luxury era in the late 1920s and 1930s.

== Design and engineering ==
=== Drivetrain ===
The engine had a new crankshaft, revised valve train and timing, different pistons, a relocated water pump generator, and all manifolds on the right side, resulting in a power increase from Model A's 88 hp to 100 hp.

== Production ==
Production totaled just 13 chassis, with only a portion receiving complete bodies. Estimates suggest that around five finished automobiles survive today. Several chassis were lost or converted during the shift to Model J production. The extreme rarity has made surviving examples highly prized among collectors, with public sales being exceptionally rare—the last notable one occurring in 1996. Notable surviving examples include:

- A 1927 Model X Boat Roadster (one-of-one, bodied by McFarlan), built for the 1927 New York Auto Salon. This influential design, with its tapered boattail and sporty proportions, is credited with inspiring later Auburn speedsters. Restored in the late 1990s, it won awards at Pebble Beach, Amelia Island, and European concours events before being donated to the Auburn Cord Duesenberg Automobile Museum, where it is prominently displayed.
- A 1927 Model X Dual-Cowl Phaeton by Locke & Company (chassis D95D), originally delivered to paper mill owner C. Walter Pratt. This is believed to be the only surviving example of its body style. It passed through notable collections, including Harrah's Automobile Collection (where it was restored and frequently driven by Bill Harrah), before entering private ownership. It has been certified by the Auburn Cord Duesenberg Club.
- A sedan originally owned by the chief engineer of General Electric.
- Additional examples, including one acquired by comedian and collector Jay Leno in the early 2000s.

== Competition ==
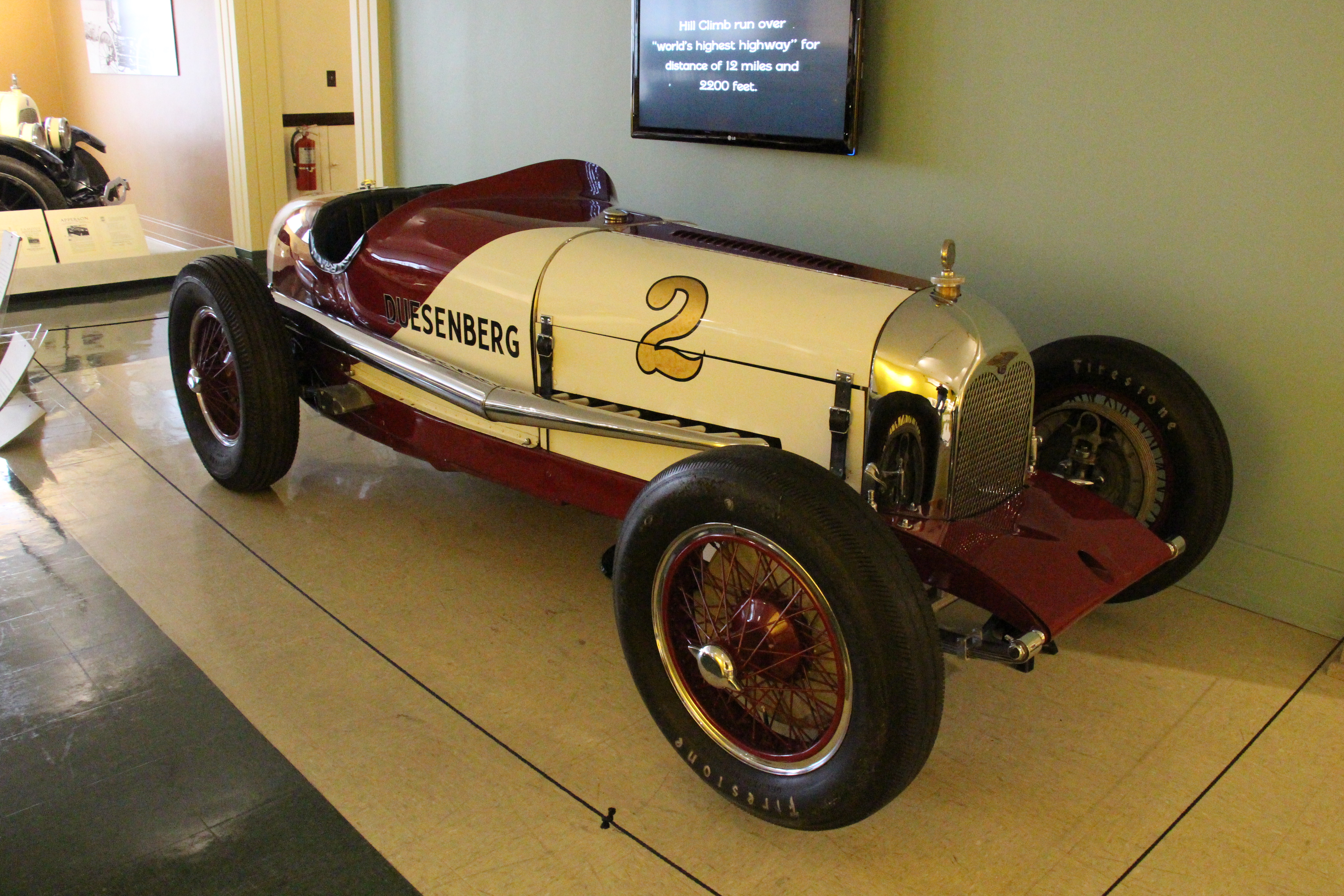
Duesenberg 91 Indianapolis 500 race car (1926–1929) at Auburn Cord Duesenberg Automobile Museum

Duesenberg was based in Indianapolis, Indiana. Fred Duesenberg won numerous prestigious competitions in 1925, 1926, and 1927 with a supercharged 1.4L racing version of the 8-cylinder Duesenberg Straight Eight, including the Indianapolis 500 and the American Motor Racing Championship.

- 1925: Victory in the 1925 American Motor Racing Championship, with 6 wins by driver Peter DePaolo.
- 1925: Victory in the 1925 Indianapolis 500, with driver Peter DePaolo.
- 1926: 5th in the 1926 Indianapolis 500, with driver Peter DePaolo.
- 1927: Winner of the 1927 Indianapolis 500, with driver George Souders, at an average speed of 156.9 km/h.

== Legacy ==
Though overshadowed by the Model J, the Duesenberg Model X represents a pinnacle of American engineering ingenuity in the 1920s. Its advanced chassis dynamics, high-performance straight-eight engine, and exclusive coachbuilt bodies embodied the era's blend of speed, luxury, and custom craftsmanship.

== Sources ==
- Kimes, Beverly Rae, ed. (1990). "Duesenberg". The Classic Car. Des Plaines, IL USA: Classic Car Club of America. pp. 229–269. ISBN 0-9627868-0-2. LCCN 90084421.
- Mueller, Mike (2006). "Chapter 6 - Chariot of the Gods Duesenberg Straight Eight". American Horsepower 100 Years of Great Car Engines. St. Paul, MN USA: Motorbooks. pp. 49–54. ISBN 978-0-7603-2327-4. LCCN 2006017040.
- Robson, Graham (2001). "Duesenberg Model A". The Illustrated Directory of Classic Cars. St. Paul, MN USA: MBI Publishing. pp. 180–181. ISBN 0-7603-1049-1.
