= Duesenberg Model A =

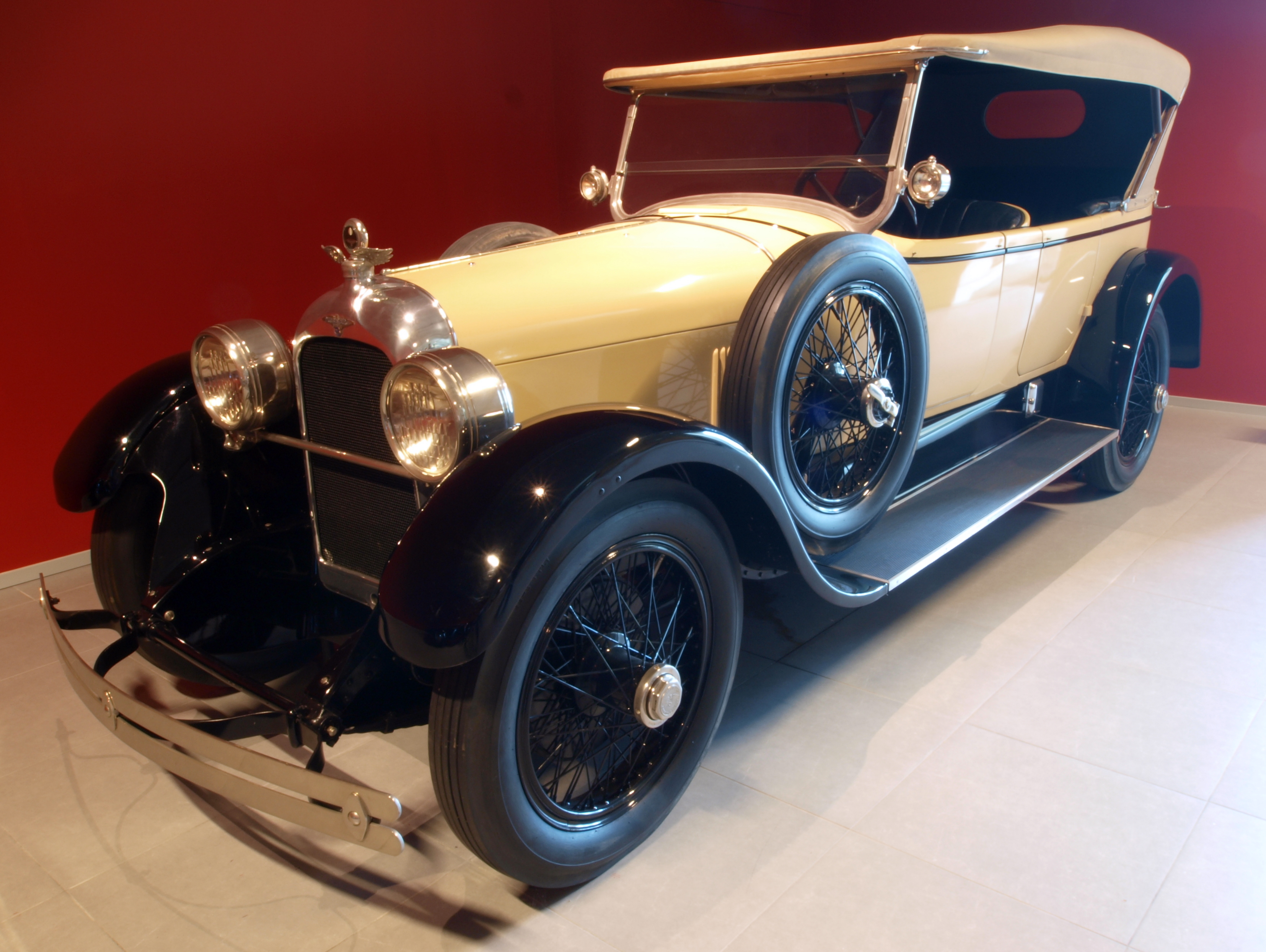
- 1923 Duesenberg Model A with touring car body by Leon Rubay

Overview
- Manufacturer: Duesenberg
- Also called: Duesenberg Straight Eight
- Production: 1921–1926
- Assembly: Indianapolis, Indiana, United States
- Designer: Fred and August Duesenberg

Body and chassis
- Class: Luxury car
- Body style: By arrangement with coachbuilder
- Layout: FR
- Related: Duesenberg Model X

Powertrain
- Engine: 260 cu in (4.3 L) OHC straight-eight engine
- Transmission: 3-speed manual

Dimensions
- Wheelbase: Standard: 3,403.6 mm (134 in); Long: 3,581.4 mm (141 in)

Chronology
- Successor: Duesenberg Model X

Duesenberg Straight 8

Overview
- Manufacturer: Duesenberg
- Production: 1921–1926

Layout
- Configuration: straight-eight engine
- Displacement: 4.3 L (260 cu in)
- Cylinder bore: 73.0 mm (2.875 in)
- Piston stroke: 127.0 mm (5.0 in)
- Cylinder block material: Cast iron, 3 bearings
- Cylinder head material: Cast iron, detachable
- Valvetrain: Shaft-driven SOHC, 2 valves/cyl.
- Compression ratio: 5:1

Combustion
- Fuel system: Single updraft Schebler 1 1/2 in carburetor
- Management: Delco coil and points, distributor mounted at end of starter/generator unit
- Fuel type: Gasoline
- Oil system: Wet sump, full pressure lubrication
- Cooling system: Water cooled

Output
- Power output: 88 bhp (66 kW) @ 3600 rpm
- Torque output: 170 lb⋅ft (230 N⋅m) at 1500 rpm

Chronology
- Successor: Duesenberg Model X

The Duesenberg Model A is a large straight eight powered luxury car produced between 1921–1926 by the American automobile manufacturer Dusenberg.

Officially known as the Duesenberg Straight Eight, the rear wheel drive Model A was first shown in late 1920 in New York City. Production was delayed by substantial changes to the design of the car, including a change in the engine valvetrain from horizontal overhead valves to an overhead camshaft; also during this time, the company had moved its headquarters and factory from New Jersey to Indiana. The Model A was manufactured in Indianapolis, Indiana, from 1921 to 1925 by the Duesenberg Automobiles and Motors Company and from 1925 to 1926 at the same factory by the restructured Duesenberg Motor Company. The successors to the company began referring to the car as the Model A when the Model J was introduced.

The Model A was the first automobile in series production to have hydraulic brakes and the first automobile in series production in the United States with a straight-eight engine. It was produced as a rolling chassis and received a wide variety of coachbuilt body styles, and was succeeded by the Duesenberg Model X.

== Background ==
Fred and August Duesenberg built aircraft and marine engines during World War I, and used this expertise to design and build racing engines and to design a car. The Duesenberg Automobiles and Motors Company was incorporated in Delaware and founded to manufacture and market the production car while Duesenberg Brothers, a separate organization, built racing cars and engines.

== Introduction and delay ==
The Duesenberg Straight Eight was introduced in late 1920 at the Commodore Hotel in New York City, but production did not begin until late 1921. The main reason for the delay was Fred Duesenberg's decision to redesign several aspects of the car, including the valvetrain. The headquarters and manufacturing facilities of the Duesenberg Automobiles and Motors Company were relocated from Newark, New Jersey, to Indianapolis, Indiana during this time. The move was completed in May 1921, but the redesign was not.

== Design and engineering ==
=== Drivetrain ===
The Straight Eight was the first car in series production in the United States with a straight-eight engine. The engine had a cast iron block, a detachable cast iron cylinder head with hemispheric combustion chambers, and an aluminum lower crankcase and oil pan. The crankshaft ran in three main bearings. While the prototype Straight Eight shown at the model's introduction had horizontal valves of the type used in earlier Duesenberg-designed marine and racing engines, the model that entered production had a shaft-driven single overhead camshaft which used rockers to operate two valves per cylinder.

The engine used a single updraft carburetor; early versions used a Stromberg unit, which was replaced by a Schebler unit. The carburetor was on the right side of the engine, the mixture went into a passage through the engine block to the intake manifold on the left side of the engine. Ignition was by Delco coil and breaker points, with the distributor at the end of the generator/starter unit.

With a 2.875 in (73.0 mm) bore and a 5 in (127.0 mm) stroke, the engine had a displacement of 260 cu in (4.3 L). The standard compression ratio of five to one yielded 88 hp (66 kW) at 3600 rpm and 170 lb⋅ft (230 N⋅m) of torque at 1500 rpm. This gave the Model A a top speed of 71 miles per hour (114 km/h).

The transmission was an unsynchronized three-speed gearbox with a single dry-plate clutch. The drive shaft was enclosed in a torque tube and drove the live rear axle through a spiral bevel drive.

=== Chassis ===
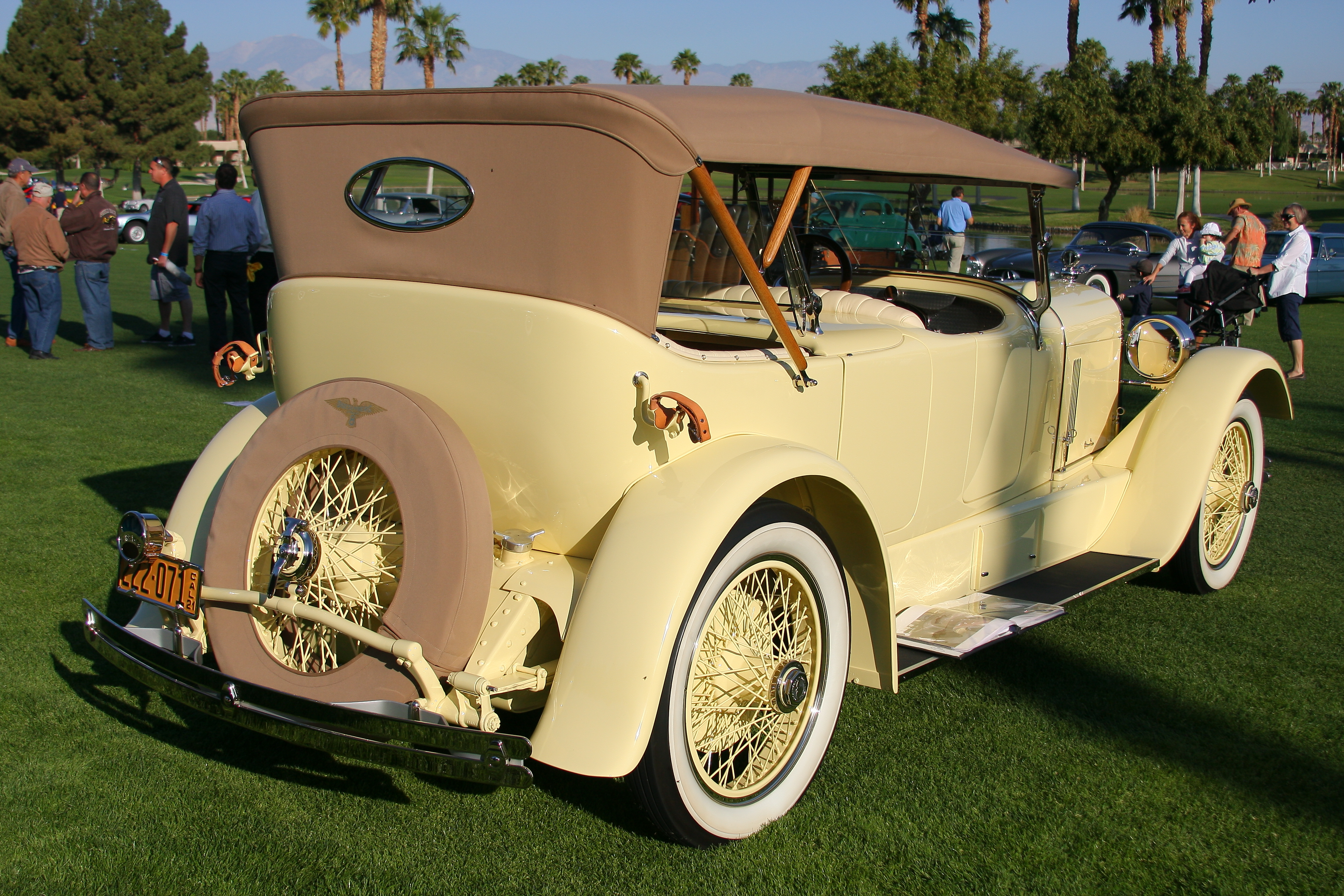
1922 Duesenberg Model A Dual Cowl Phaeton by Fleetwood

The chassis was based on a pressed steel ladder frame with channel-section side members and fabricated and tubular cross members. Suspension was by semi-elliptic leaf springs and Watson Stabilator dampers front and rear, with a tubular beam axle at the front and a live axle and radius rods at the rear. The standard wheelbase was 134 inches (3,400 mm), stretched to 141 inches (3,600 mm) for seven-passenger bodies. The front and rear tracks were both 56 inches (1,400 mm) wide. Center-locking wire wheels with 5" x 33" tires were used front and rear.

The Duesenberg Straight Eight was the first production automobile to use Lockheed Corporation hydraulic brakes on all four wheels. The brakes on the front wheels were 16 inches (410 mm) in diameter and were finned to dissipate heat. The fluid used in the system was a mixture of glycerine and water.

== Production ==
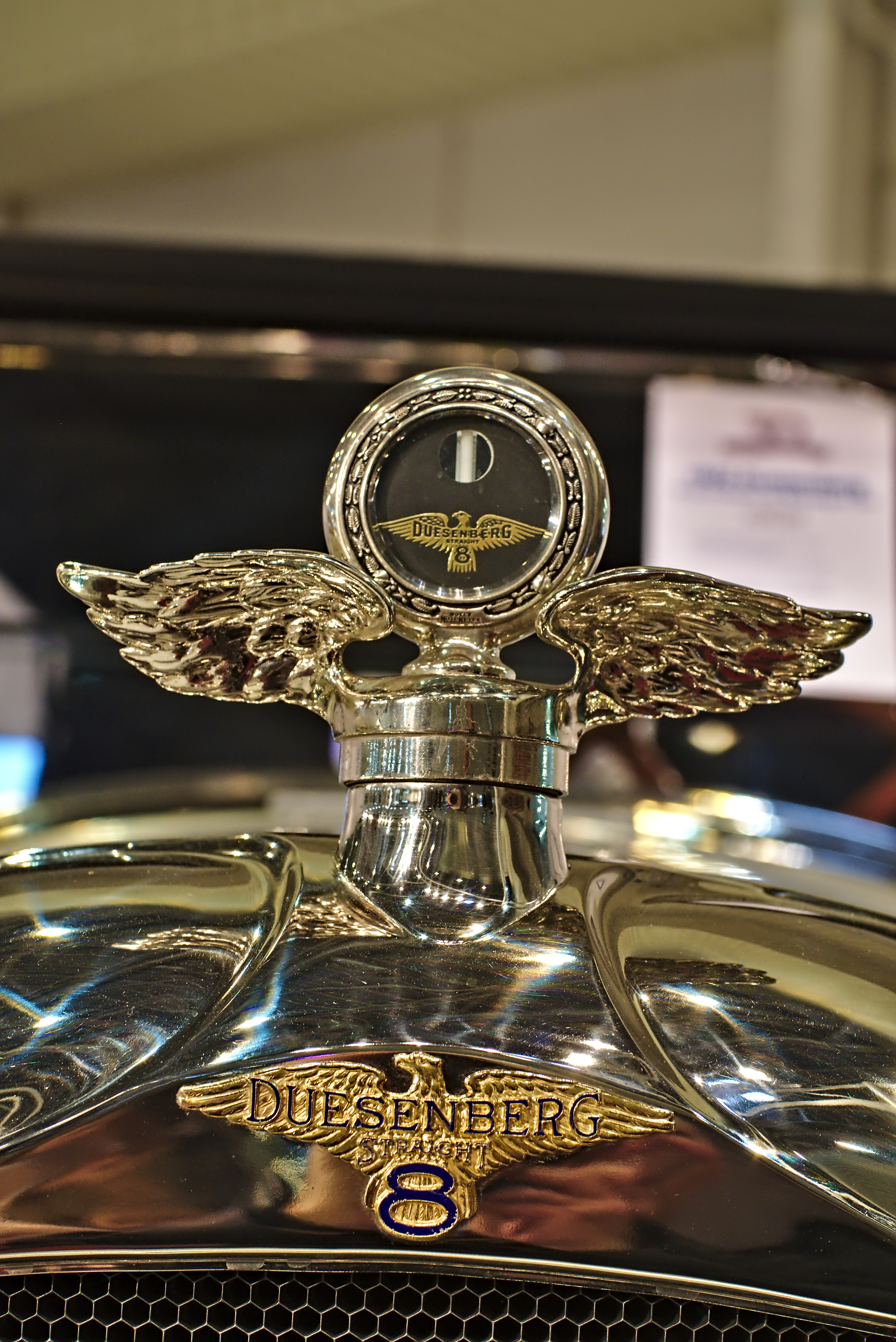
Duesenberg Model A badge and mascot

The initial production target was 100 cars per month. By the end of 1922, after slightly more than a year of production, fewer than 150 Duesenberg Straight Eights had been built. Manufacture continued through several changes in management, placement of the Duesenberg Automobiles and Motors Company into receivership in January 1924, and the restructuring of the company into the Duesenberg Motor Company in February 1925. Production was ended following the October 1926 purchase of the company by E. L. Cord, with some 650 Straight Eights having been built.

== Legacy ==
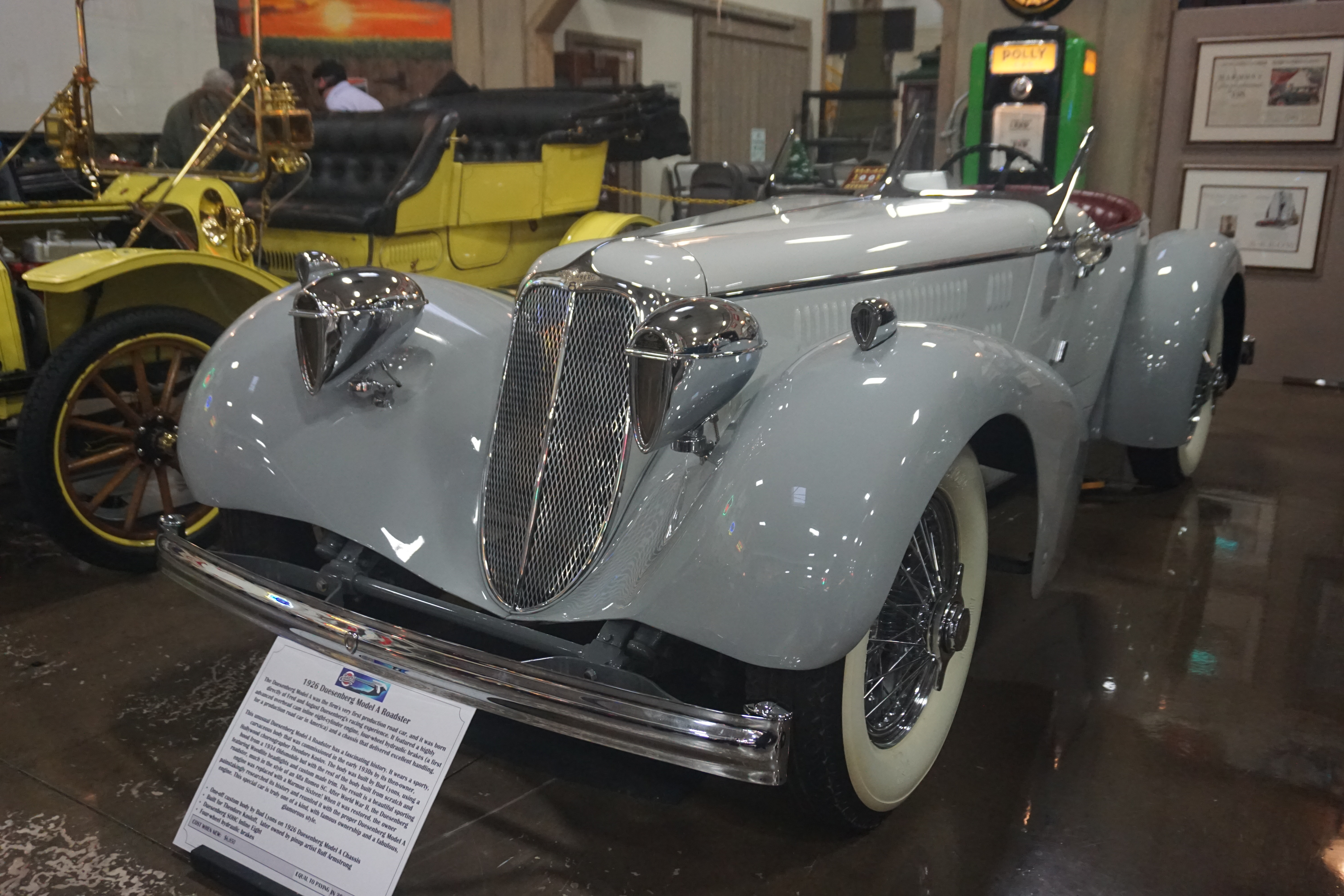
1926 Duesenberg Model A Roadster at Stahls Automotive Collection

The Model A was succeeded in 1927 by the Model X, a larger derivative with an exceedingly small production run of approximately twelve units.

It rode on a 135 in (3,400 mm) wheelbase, and had an engine of the same bore and stroke but with a non-crossflow head that delivered 100 horsepower (75 kW).

Despite its regional and worldwide automotive firsts, the Straight Eight has been obscured by the later Model J. It is no longer widely known by the Straight Eight name under which it was marketed and sold, having been renamed the "Model A" after the introduction of the Model J.
