= Sunbeam 3-litre =

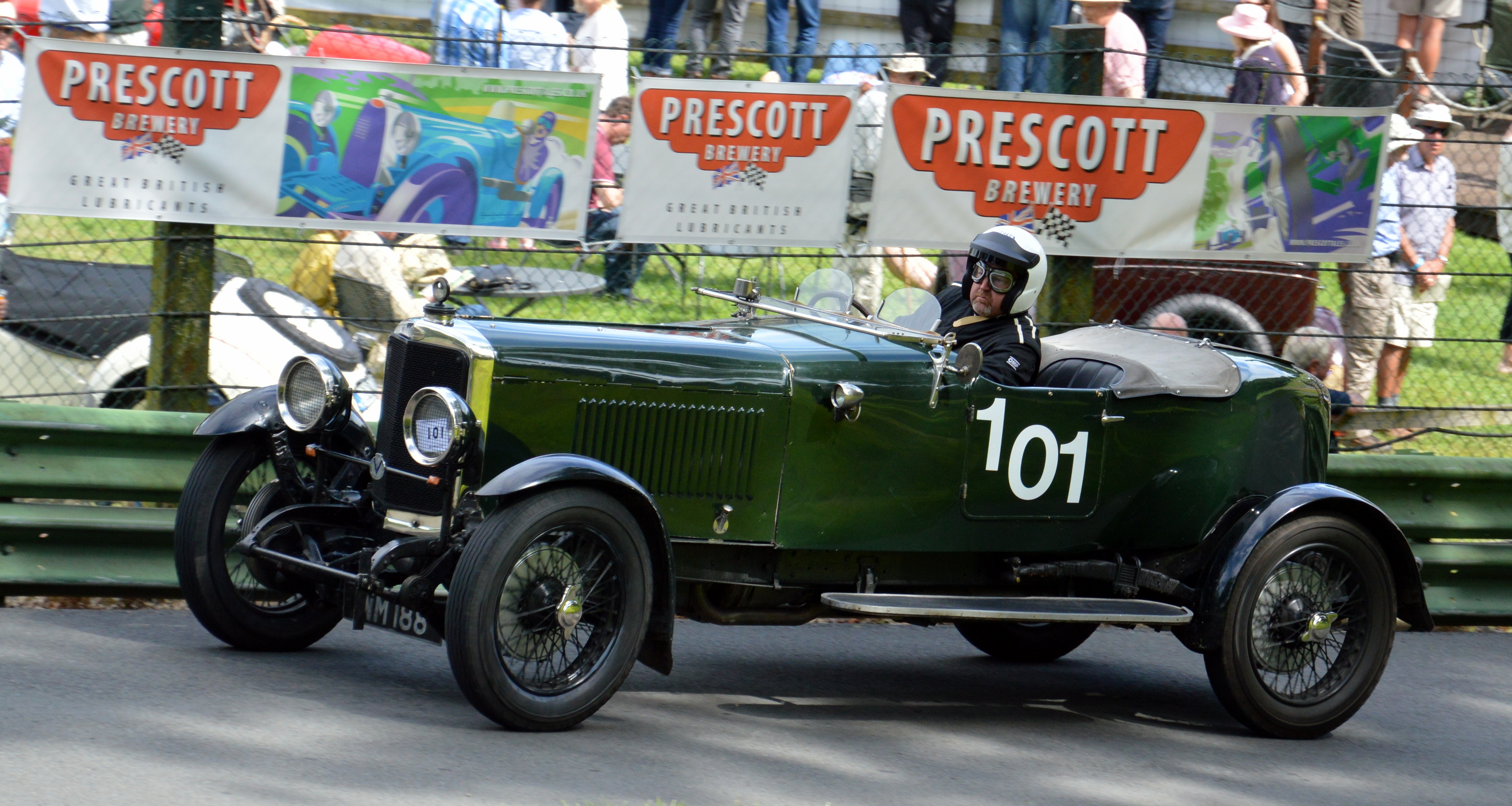
- 1926 Sunbeam 3-litre Super Sports 2-door

Overview
- Manufacturer: Sunbeam
- Production: 1926–1930

Body and chassis
- Body style: lightweight open tourer

Powertrain
- Engine: 2920 cc Straight-6 dohc
- Transmission: 4-speed manual sliding-pinion

Dimensions
- Wheelbase: 130.5 in (3,315 mm)

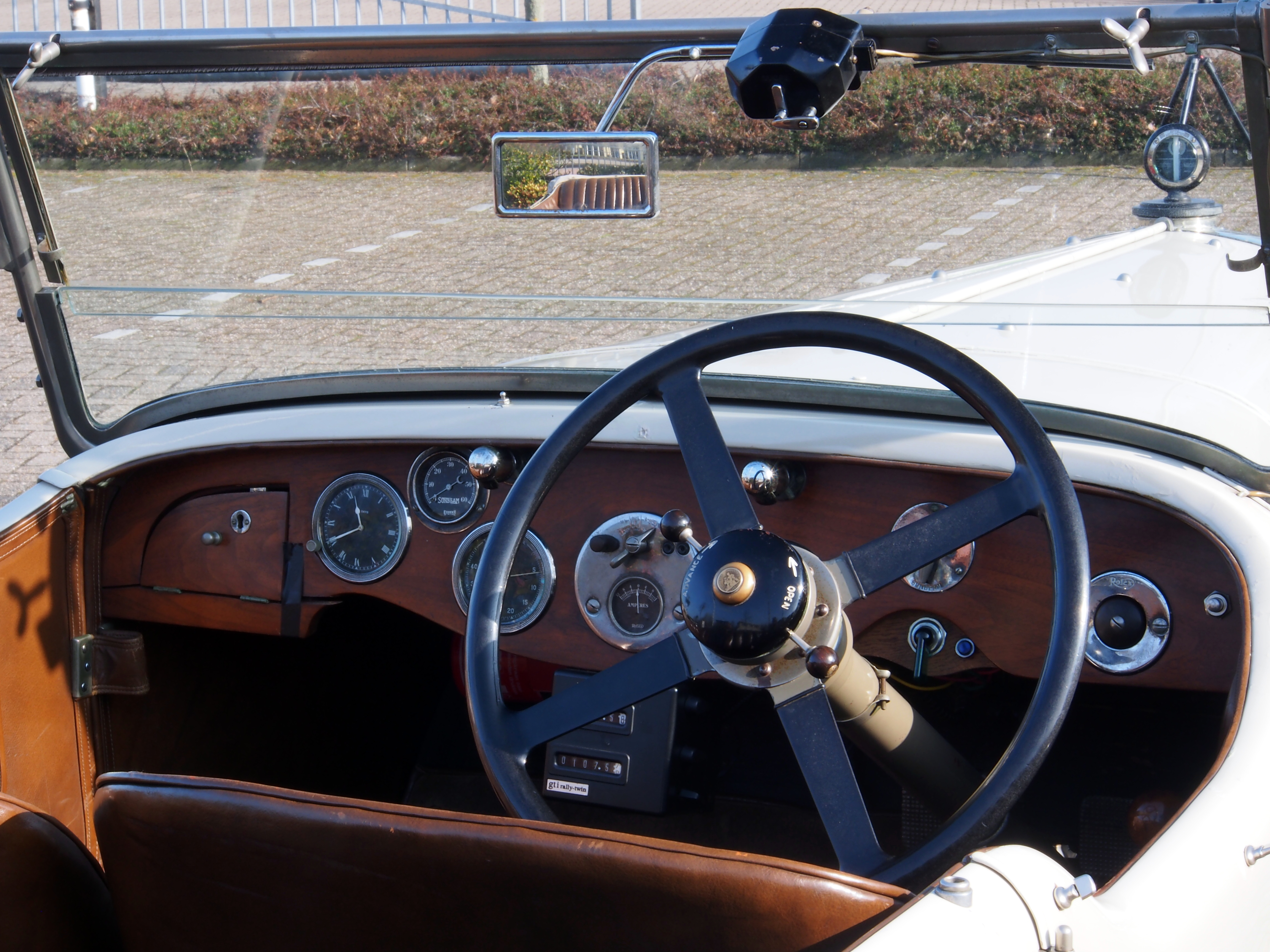
1926 Sunbeam 3-litre 4-door open tourer

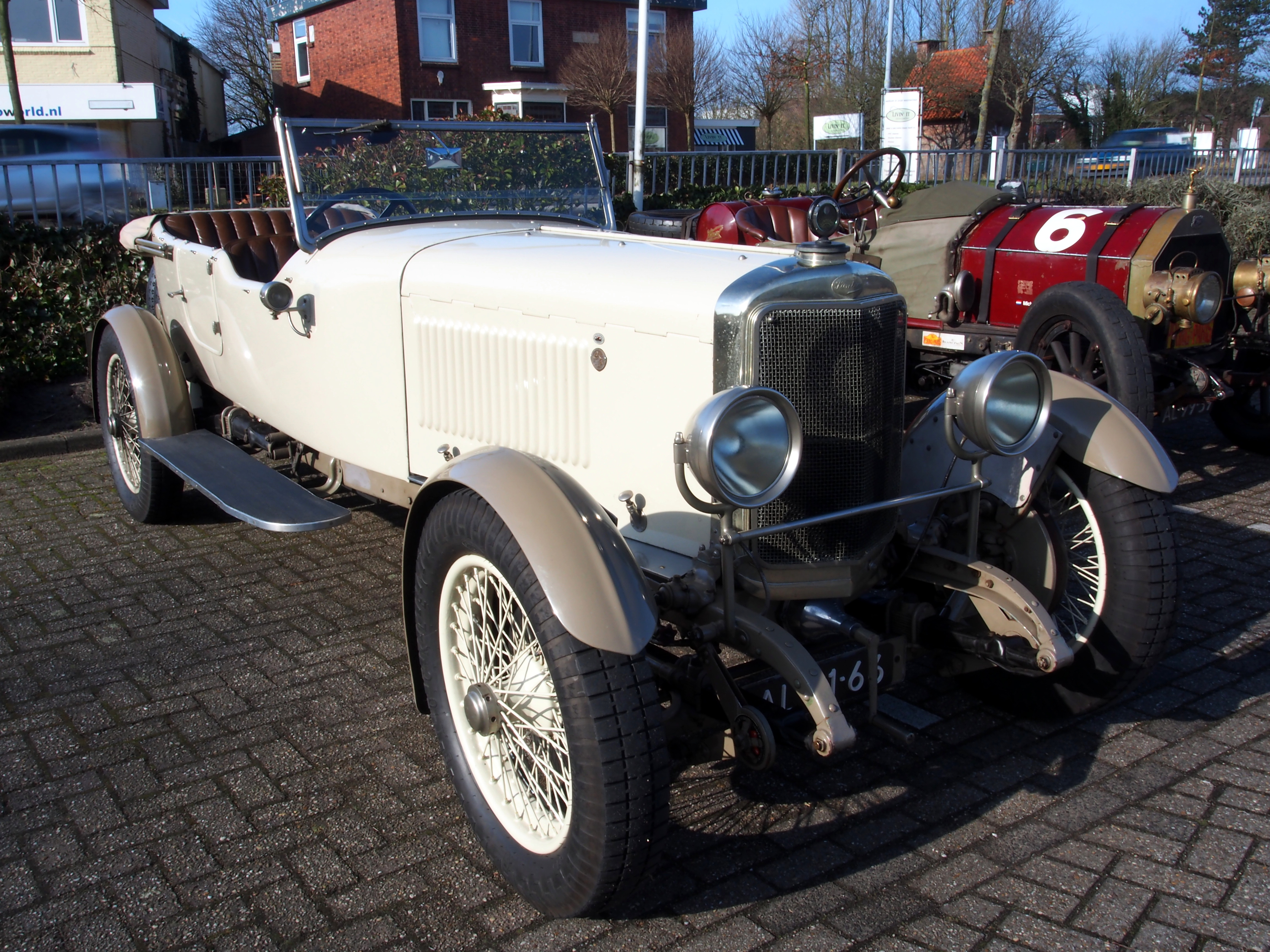
1926 Sunbeam 3-litre 4-door open tourer

The Sunbeam 3-litre is a 26 long cwt (2,912 lb; 1,321 kg) sports car introduced by Sunbeam in October 1925 at the London Motor Show, and was offered from 1926 until 1930. It was seen at the time and subsequently as the retort of Louis Hervé Coatalen, Sunbeam's energetic chief engineer, to the Bentley 3 Litre which by then was beginning to make its mark, having won at Le Mans earlier that year.

The Sunbeam's engine was of 2,920 cc, distributed between six cylinders. It featured inclined valves operated via easily adjustable tappet levers by two overhead camshafts, an important innovation at the time. The detailed design of the engine followed many of the principles of the engines which were gathering plaudits for the company on European racing circuits. The cylinder head and block were formed from a single casting which was then considered normal for high-performance engines. One of the novel features of the engine was its use of dry-sump lubrication whereby engine oil was drawn from a tank positioned beside the engine. In 1929 a supercharger was added, increasing the power output to 135bhp.

The cylinder bores translated into a fiscal horse-power rating of 20.9 hp which under the system operating in the 1920s attracted an annual Road Fund Tax of £21. The big four-cylinder engines of the competitor vehicles from Bentley incurred an annual Road Fund Tax of £16. The difference of £5 might be considered immaterial for anyone who could afford to purchase and run a car of this type, but £5 was at the time more than the average weekly wage in Britain, so the annual saving to the Bentley buyer may well have been significant even in this class.

The Bentley gained a reputation as the more robust of the two cars, although in standard form the Sunbeam was reported to be marginally quicker. Two Sunbeams were entered in the 1925 Le Mans, one driven by Henry Segrave and George Duller, the other by Jean Chassagne and Sammy Davis. Segrave and Duller were forced to retire but Chassagne and Davis achieved second place, beaten only by the Lorraine-Dietrich of Rossignol and de Courcelles. In retrospect the Sunbeam's achievement became eclipsed by the extent to which the race came to be dominated by Bentleys during the second half of the decade.

Although the sturdily constructed chassis was based on that from earlier Sunbeams, the hitherto characteristic semi-elliptical leaf springs were, at the back, replaced by cantilever rear springs which during the second half of the decade became a Sunbeam hallmark.
