= Chrysler Turbine Car =

Turbine-powered automobile produced by Chrysler from 1963 to 1964

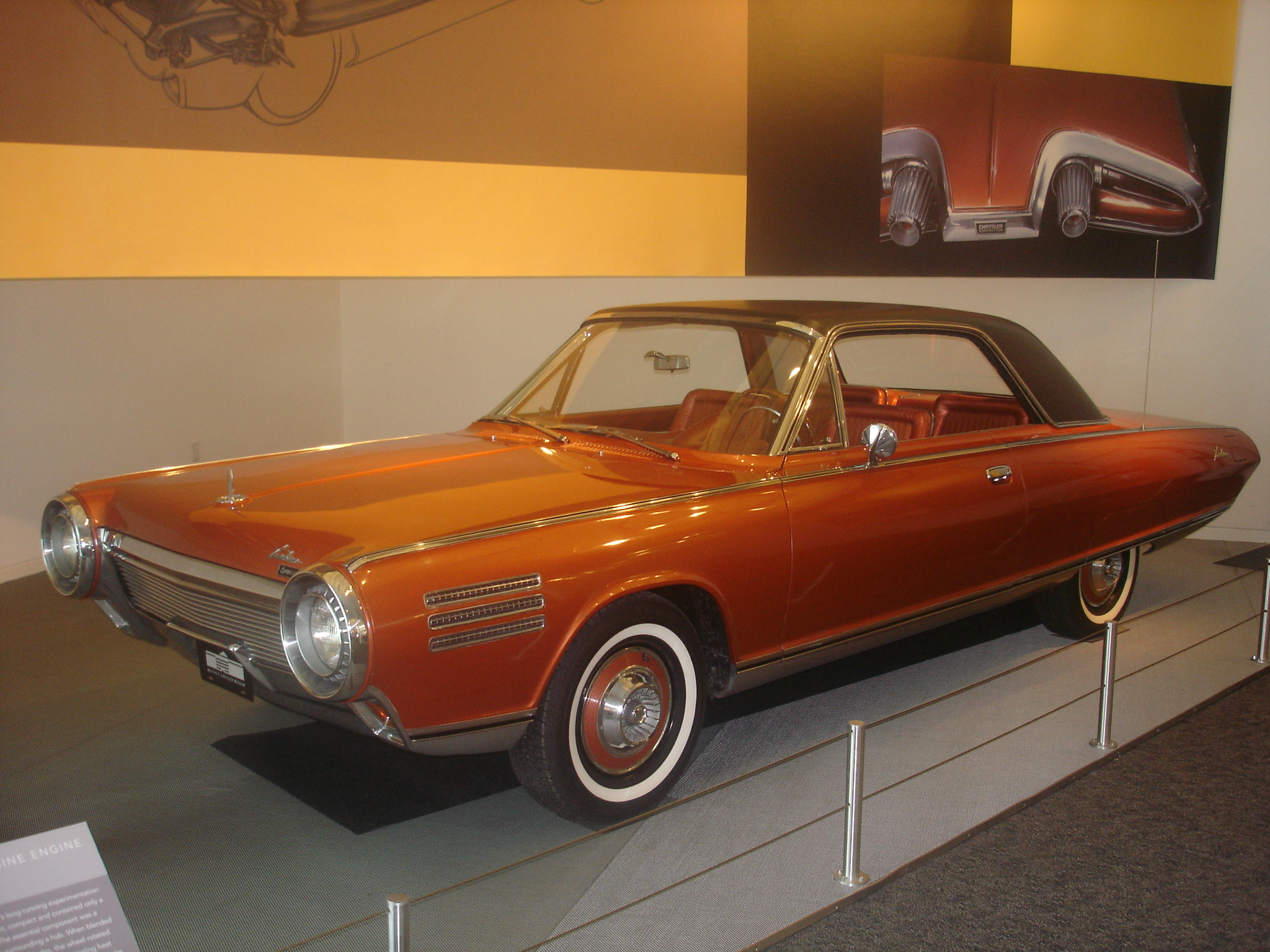
- Chrysler Turbine Car at the Walter P. Chrysler Museum in Auburn Hills, Michigan

Overview
- Manufacturer: Chrysler
- Production: 1963–1964; 55 produced
- Assembly: Turin, Italy (bodywork); Detroit, Michigan, United States
- Designer: Elwood Engel

Body and chassis
- Class: Concept car
- Body style: 2-door coupe
- Layout: FR layout

Powertrain
- Engine: Chrysler A-831 gas turbine
- Transmission: 3-speed TorqueFlite

Dimensions
- Wheelbase: 110 in (2,794 mm)
- Length: 201.6 in (5,121 mm)
- Width: 72.9 in (1,852 mm)
- Height: 53.5 in (1,359 mm)
- Curb weight: 3,952 lb (1,793 kg)

The Chrysler Turbine Car is an experimental two-door hardtop coupe powered by a turbine engine and was manufactured by Chrysler from 1963 to 1964. Italian design studio Carrozzeria Ghia constructed the bodywork, and Chrysler completed the final assembly in Detroit. A total of 55 cars were manufactured: five prototypes and a limited run of fifty cars for a public user program. All have a signature metallic paint named "turbine bronze", roughly the color of root beer. The car was styled by Elwood Engel and Chrysler studios. They featured power brakes, power steering, and a TorqueFlite transmission.

The Chrysler turbine engine program that produced the Turbine Car began during the late 1930s and created prototypes that completed long-distance trips in the 1950s and early 1960s. The A-831 engines that powered the Ghia-designed Turbine Car could operate on many fuels, required less maintenance, and lasted longer than conventional piston engines. However, they were much more expensive to produce.

After testing, Chrysler conducted a user program from October 1963 to January 1966 that involved 203 drivers in 133 cities in the United States cumulatively driving more than one million miles (1.6 million km). The program helped the company determine problems with the cars, notably with their complicated starting procedure, relatively unimpressive acceleration, and sub-par fuel economy and noise. The experience also revealed the advantages of the turbine engines, including their remarkable durability, smooth operation, and relatively modest maintenance requirements.

After the user program ended in 1966, Chrysler reclaimed the cars and destroyed all but nine; Chrysler kept two cars, six are displayed at museums in the United States, and one is in comedian Jay Leno's private collection. Chrysler's turbine engine program ended in 1979, mainly due to the failure of the engines to meet government emissions regulations, relatively poor fuel economy, and as a condition of receiving a government loan in 1979.

== Background ==
Chrysler began researching turbine engines for aviation applications during the late 1930s, led primarily by executive engineer George Huebner. After World War II, Huebner was part of a group of engineers who began exploring the idea of powering a car with a turbine. Other members of the secretive Chrysler research team that worked on automotive turbines included fellow engineers Bud Mann and Sam B. Williams. The concept intrigued them, mainly because turbine engines have fewer moving parts than their piston-powered counterparts and can run on a variety of fuels. According to historian Charles K. Hyde, by the mid-1950s Chrysler "led the way in terms of gas turbine research" (although General Motors and Rover also built operational turbine cars after World War II).

After improving their turbine design, most notably by engineering a regenerator to resolve an issue with heat exchange, the Chrysler team's efforts reached early maturity when they mated a turbine to an otherwise-stock 1954 Plymouth Belvedere. Heating, cooling, and emissions were among the principal engineering challenges in designing a car around a turbine engine. Chrysler tested the Belvedere, claiming that its turbine engine contained 20% fewer parts and weighed 200 pounds (91 kg) less than comparable, conventional piston engines. On June 16, 1954, the company publicly unveiled the turbine-powered Belvedere at its Chelsea Proving Grounds in Chelsea, Michigan, in front of over 500 reporters.

Chrysler unveiled its next turbine car, a 1956 Plymouth, on March 23, 1956; Huebner drove it 3,020 miles (4,860 km) on a four-day trip from New York City to Los Angeles. Although the car was shadowed by a 14-person convoy of mechanics with fuel and spare parts, it only required two minor repairs on the trip (neither of which were engine-related). The coast-to-coast journey's success led Chrysler to double the size of its turbine program and move it from the Highland Park Chrysler Plant to a larger facility on Greenfield Road in Detroit.

The program began generating several patent applications in 1957, due mainly to the contributions of metallurgist Amedee Roy and engineer Giovanni Savonuzzi. The next iteration of the Chrysler turbine engine (the second-generation engine) was placed into a 1959 Plymouth, which averaged 19.4 miles per US gallon (12.1 L/100 km; 23.3 mpg_{‑imp}) on a trip from Detroit to Woodbridge, New Jersey. This mileage was substantially higher than the 13 mpg_{‑US} (18 L/100 km; 16 mpg_{‑imp}) achieved with the first-generation turbine on the 1956 New York-to-Los Angeles journey.

After Chrysler named former accountant Lynn Townsend its new president in 1961, the company unveiled its next, third-generation turbine engine on February 28; the CR2A was the first Chrysler turbine engine to be officially named. Unlike its more experimental predecessors, the CR2A was designed with an eye on costs and production methods. While the engine was under development in May 1960, Huebner said that it would serve as its own torque converter, generate 140 horsepower (100 kW), have an acceleration lag of 1.5 seconds (compared with nine seconds for its predecessor), and weighed 150–450 lb (68–204 kg) less than a comparably sized piston engine.

Third-generation turbines were mated to a variety of vehicles, including a 2.5-ton 1960 Dodge truck and the Chrysler Turboflite concept car. Refined CR2A turbines were installed into a 1962 Dodge Dart and Plymouth Fury; the Dart was driven from New York City to Los Angeles in December 1961, and the Fury completed a journey from Los Angeles to San Francisco in January 1962. After Huebner arrived in Los Angeles with the Dart, he spent two hours giving journalists rides in the turbine-powered car.

Chrysler had barnstormed its fleet of turbine cars to dealers across North America, Europe, and Mexico by February 1962, visiting 90 cities, giving rides to almost 14,000 people, and being seen by millions more. The third-generation turbine program ended at the 1962 Chicago Auto Show that month, where the company displayed its turbine-powered fleet. Shortly before the show, Chrysler announced an upcoming fourth-generation turbine engine it planned to install in a limited run of 50–75 cars which would be loaned to the public at no cost in late 1963, a decision primarily due to enthusiastic public response to the barnstorming tour.

== Engine ==
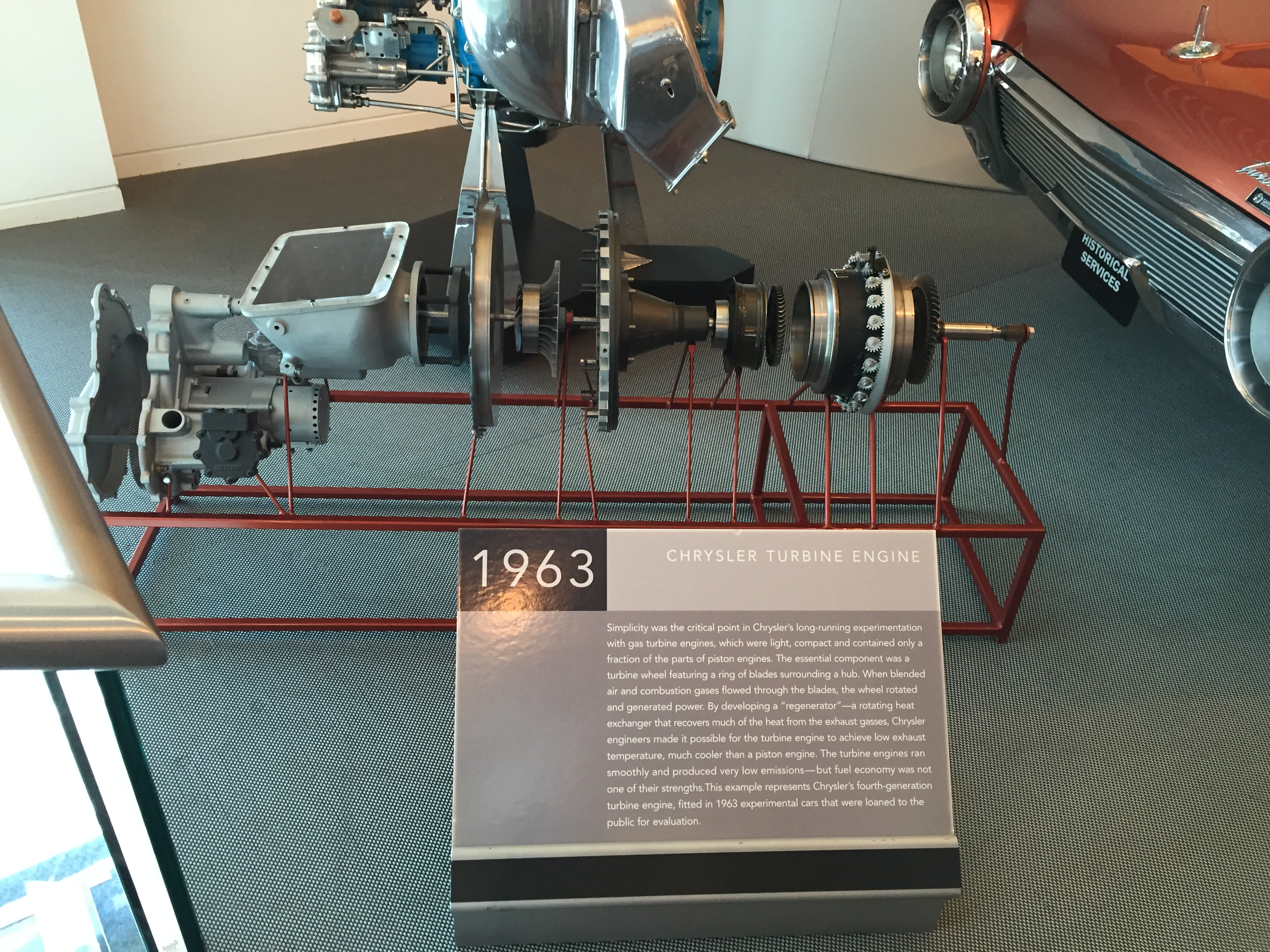
Exploded view of the A-831 turbine engine at the Walter P. Chrysler Museum

The Chrysler Turbine Car is powered by the A-831, Chrysler's fourth-generation turbine engine. The most notable difference from its predecessor, the CR2A, was its use of twin regenerators (one mounted on either side of the gasifier) instead of a single top cover-mounted heat exchanger. This design helped the A-831 trim 40 pounds (18 kg) from the CR2A's weight, reducing it to a relatively light 410 lb (186 kg). Due to their construction, the engines did not require antifreeze, a cooling system, a radiator, connecting rods, or crankshafts.

The A-831 could operate on diesel fuel, unleaded gasoline, kerosene, and JP-4 jet fuel; leaded gasoline damaged it. According to Chrysler, it could burn a variety of unusual fuels ranging from furnace oil and perfume to peanut and soybean oils. Mexican President Adolfo López Mateos ran one of the cars on tequila after Chrysler engineers confirmed that it would do so.

The engine produced 130 bhp (97 kW) at 36,000 revolutions per minute (rpm) and idled between 18,000 and 22,000 rpm. At stall, the engine was capable of delivering 425 lb⋅ft (576 N⋅m) of torque. At idle, its exhaust did not exceed 180 °F (82 °C). When driven at 120 mph (193 km/h), the turbine ran at its maximum of 60,000 rpm. The A-831's compressor had a pressure ratio of 4:1 and an efficiency of 80%; its combustor operated at 95% efficiency.

Compared to conventional piston engines, turbine engines generally require less maintenance, last longer, and start more easily in cold conditions; the A-831 started properly at temperatures as low as −20 °F (−29 °C). The first car to receive an A-831 was a Plymouth Fury. In this Ghia-built turbine car, the engine had a 0-to-60 mph (97 km/h) time of about 12 seconds. Due to the exotic materials and strict tolerances needed to build the engines and the investment casting method with which they were made, the A-831s were very expensive to produce; Chrysler never disclosed their actual cost.

== Design ==
The Turbine Car was styled in the Chrysler studios under the direction of Elwood Engel, who had worked for the Ford Motor Company before moving to Chrysler. Due to its resemblance to the Engel-designed Ford Thunderbird, the car is occasionally called the "Englebird". According to Huebner, the design was intended to compete with the Chevrolet Corvette in addition to the Thunderbird.

The car's bodies were handmade by Italian design studio Ghia, which had built several concept cars for Chrysler (including the Imperial limousines and the Norseman). The mostly completed Turbine Car bodies, which were assembled, painted, trimmed, and upholstered by Ghia in Italy, were shipped to Chrysler's Greenfield Road turbine facility in Detroit for final assembly; this consisted of installing the turbine engines, TorqueFlite transmissions, electrical wiring, and components such as radios and heaters. Building an individual car may have cost as much as $55,000 (equivalent to $571,000 in 2025); Virgil Exner, Jr., estimates that the bodies themselves cost about $20,000 (equivalent to $208,000 in 2025). However, Chrysler never revealed the cost of each turbine engine.

The first five cars were completed in early 1962 as prototypes used for troubleshooting; each was slightly different from the others, varying in exterior color, interior upholstery, and roof material. Early problems discovered from the prototypes included sluggish acceleration (attributed in part to the relatively heavy hand-built bodies) and vibration, ultimately determined to be caused by the tire treads and noticeable due to the unusual smoothness of the turbine engine.

A total of 50 identical Turbine Cars were built between October 1963 and October 1964. They were all two-door hardtop coupes, with air-over-oil power brakes and power steering. The cars had independent front suspension with a coil spring at each front wheel, eschewing Chrysler's contemporary-standard independent front longitudinal torsion bar system (although their rear suspension utilized off-the-shelf leaf springs). All four wheels were equipped with power-assisted drum brakes.

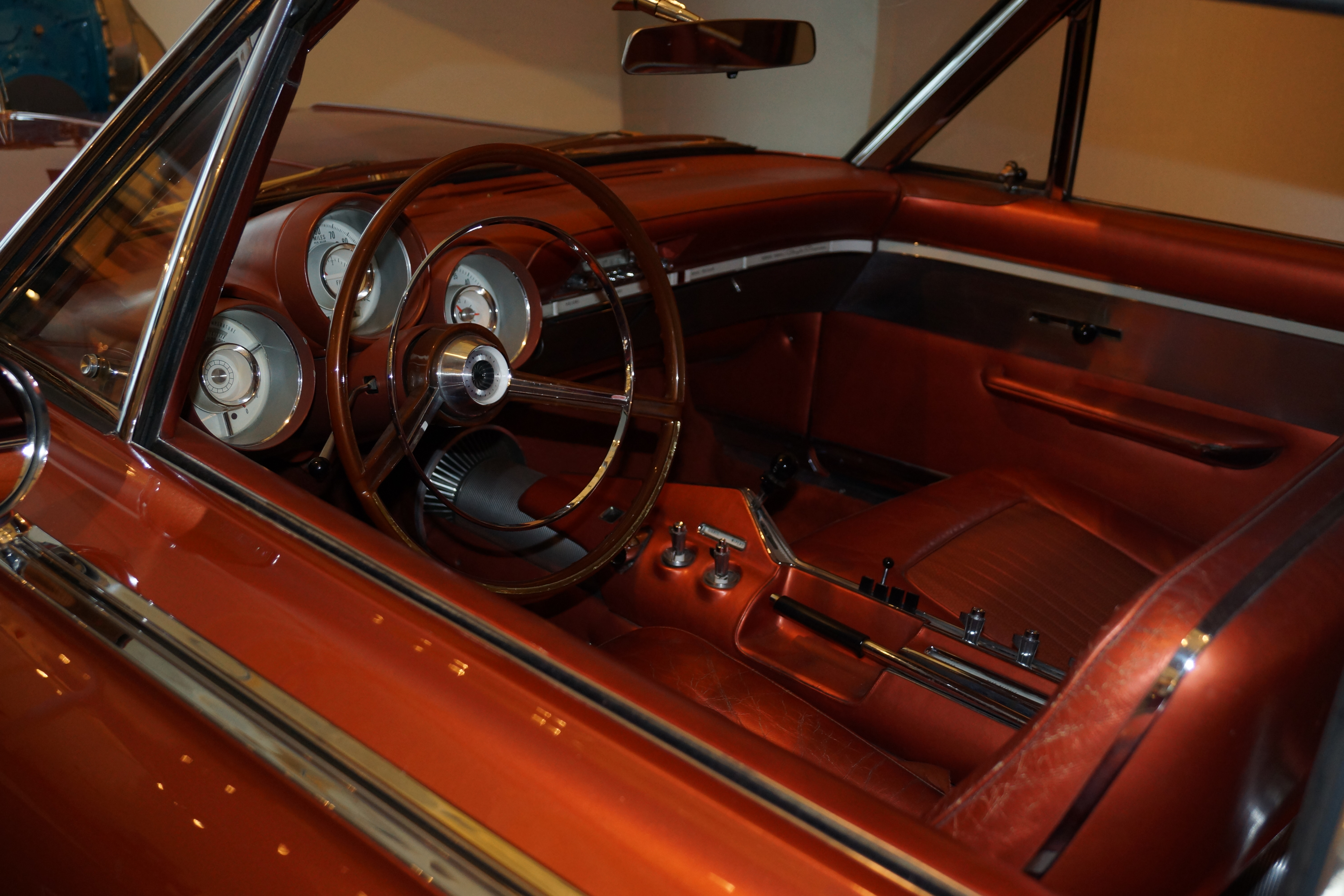
The Turbine Car interior

The car body is finished in a metallic, root beer-colored paint known as "turbine bronze". Its headlights, deeply-recessed taillights, turn signals, and pod-shaped backup lights are mounted in chrome bezels. The turbine-inspired style carries through to the center console design of the interior, which has bronze-colored leather upholstery, deep-pile bronze carpet, and brushed aluminum accents. The cars have black vinyl covered hardtop roofs, leather-upholstered bucket seats for front and rear passengers, and whitewall tires.

The Turbine Car's dashboard is dominated by three large gauges: a speedometer, a tachometer, and pyrometer, the latter monitoring the temperature of the turbine inlet (the engine's hottest component). Its appearance is mostly stock, although the tachometer and pyrometer display abnormally high readings compared to piston-engine cars: 46,000 rpm and 1,700 °F (930 °C), respectively. All 55 turbine cars had identical ignition keys.

== User program ==
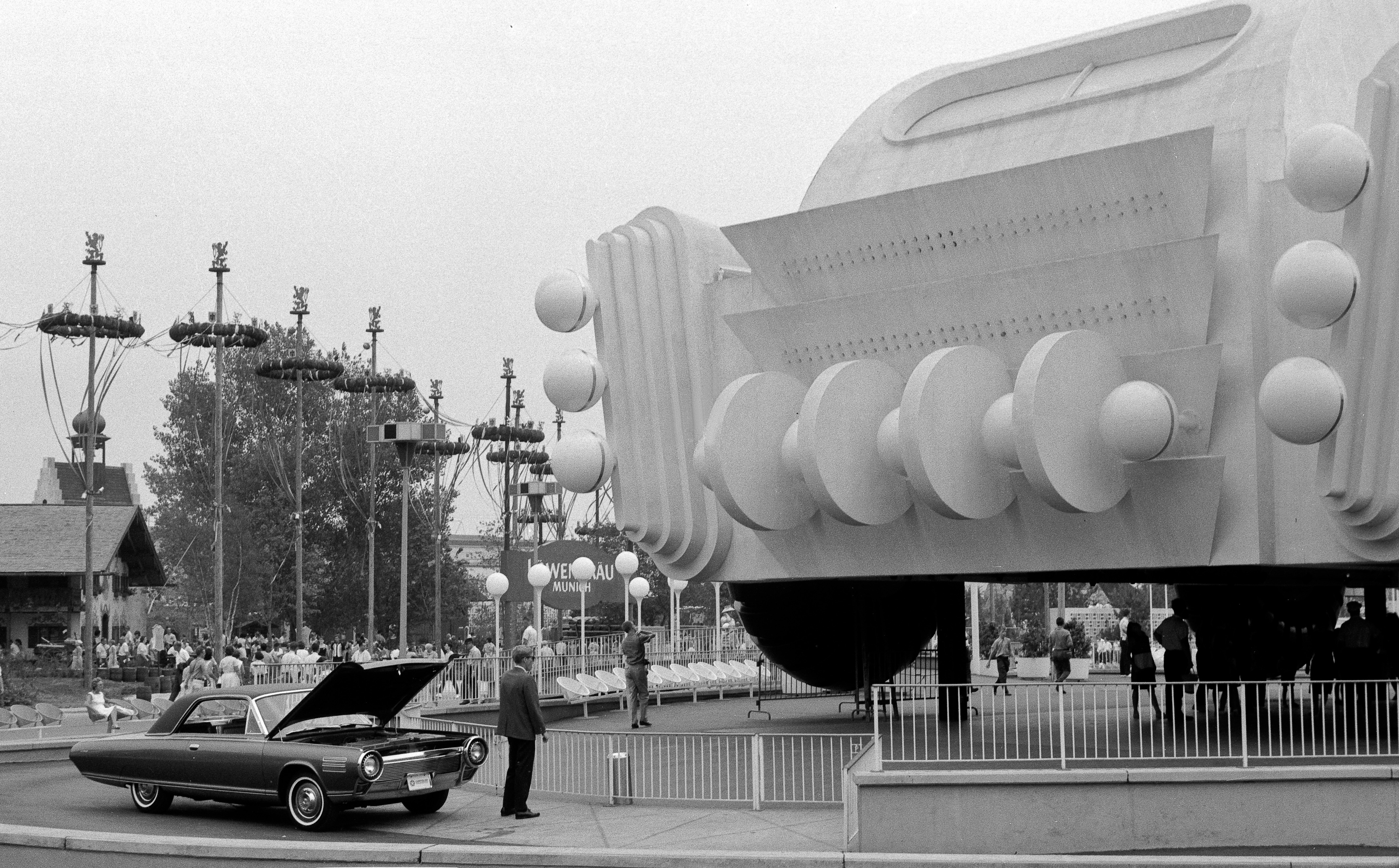
Chrysler Turbine Car at the 1964 New York World's Fair

Two of the cars gave rides to visitors at the 1964 New York World's Fair, and another went on a worldwide tour; 50 were lent to the general public as part of a user program. The cars were given to drivers for three months at no charge, aside from fuel costs; participants also gave Chrysler in-depth interviews within two weeks of returning their cars. During the user program, which ran from October 1963 to January 1966, the cars' operational downtime was reduced from four percent early on to one percent by its conclusion.

The user program helped identify a variety of problems with the cars, including starter malfunction at high altitudes, difficulty in mastering the unusual eight-step starting procedure (which, for some users, resulted in engine damage), and the cars' relatively unimpressive acceleration. Nonetheless, the turbine engines were remarkably durable in comparison to contemporary piston engines. The most-cited advantages of the turbine engine, according to the participants' interviews, were its smooth and vibration-free operation, reduced maintenance requirements, and ease of starting in different conditions; the most-common complaints concerned its slow acceleration, sub-par fuel economy, and relatively high noise level. Investigating the latter complaint, Chrysler found that the distinctive sound of the car's turbine (reminiscent of a jet engine) was positively received by about 60% of those involved in the user program and disliked by about 20% of their fellow users.

The cars had conspicuous warning labels cautioning drivers to avoid using leaded gasoline; although the turbine engine could run using leaded fuel, it left debilitating deposits in the engine. This left Chrysler recommending against the very fuel that was most common and easily obtained at the time of the program. Fuels commonly used by those participating in the user program included diesel and home heating oil.

More than 1 million miles (1.6 million km) were accumulated in testing by the 50 cars given to the public, which were driven by 203 users before the program ended in January 1966. The users lived in 133 cities in the 48 contiguous states and Washington, D.C.; 180 were male and 23 were female, their ages ranged from 21 to 70, and 60% were Chrysler owners.

== Legacy ==
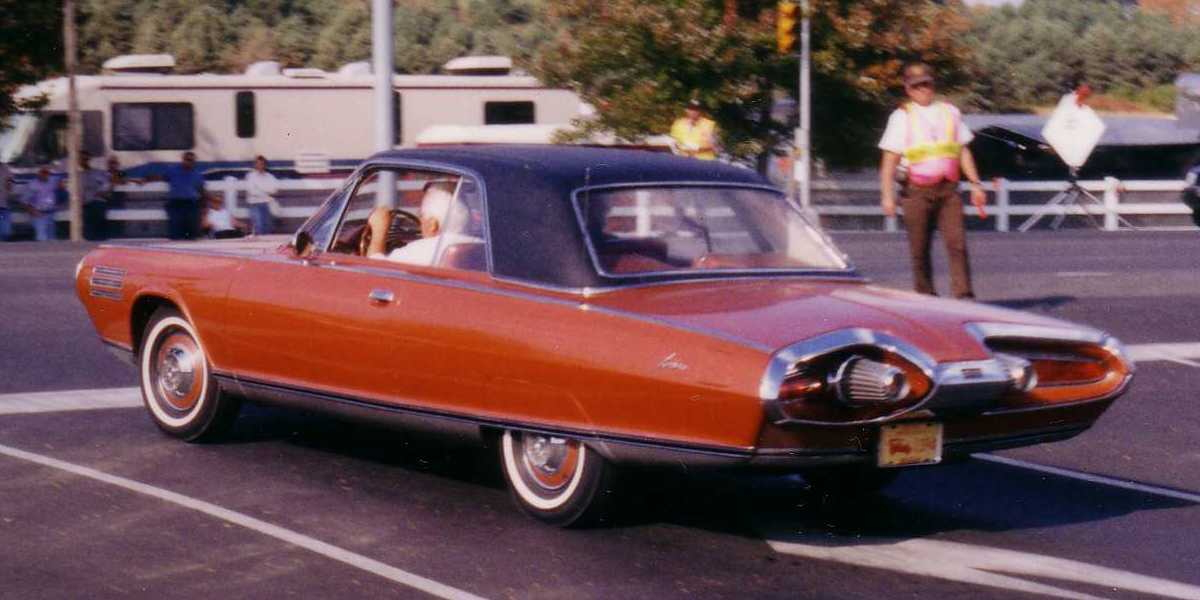
Chrysler Turbine Car at the 1999 Antique Automobile Club of America show in Hershey, Pennsylvania

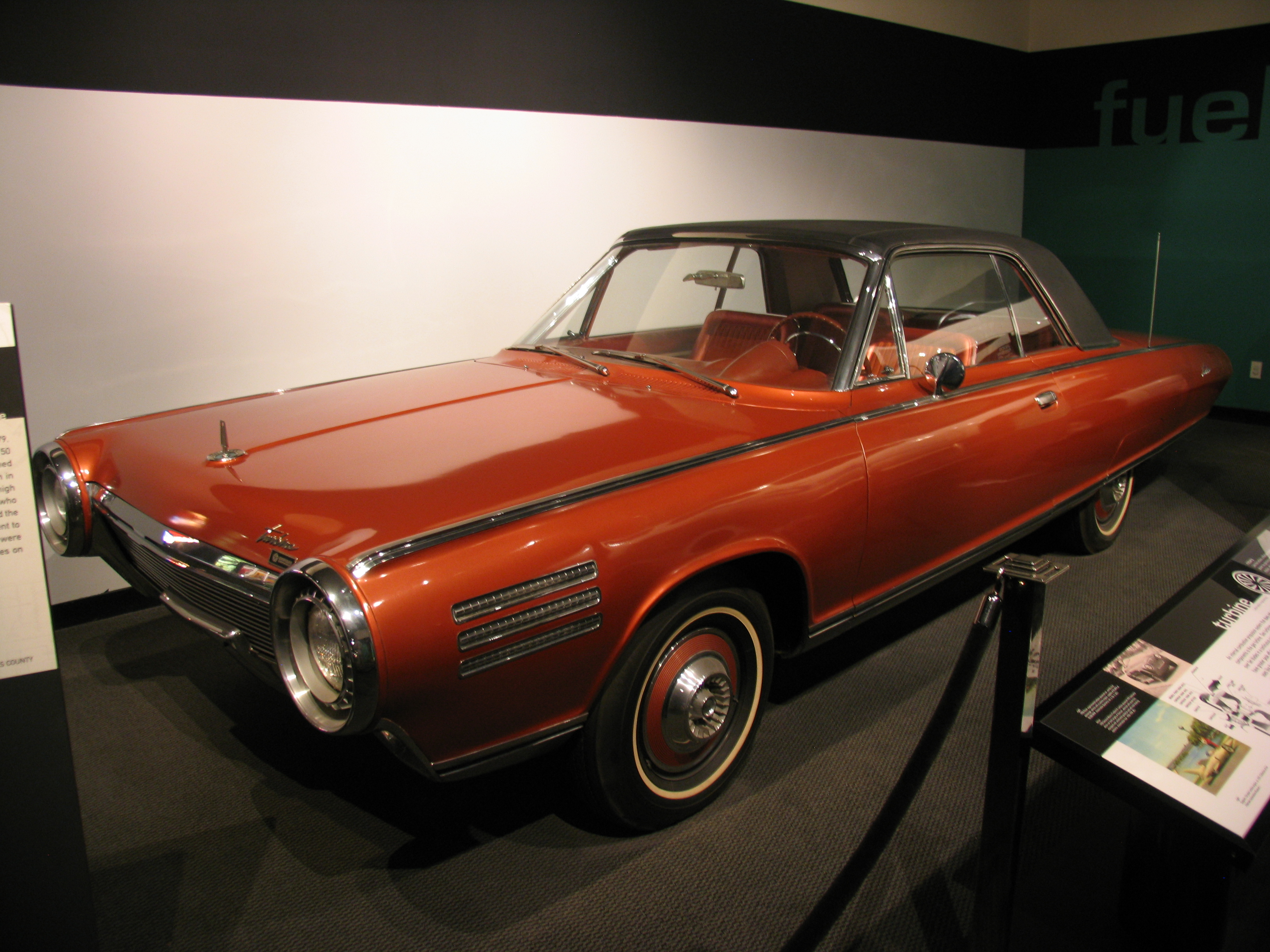
Chrysler Turbine Car at the Petersen Automotive Museum in Los Angeles

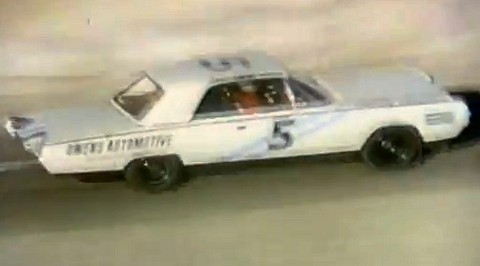
Still of a Turbine Car in the 1964 film The Lively Set

In April 1966, Product Planning and Development Vice President, Harry E. Chesebrough, noted that the 50 test cars would be taken off the road regardless of whether the Chrysler Turbine Car went into production. Chrysler destroyed 46 of the cars after it finished the user program and other public displays. Forty-five of the cars were burned and crushed at a scrapyard south of Detroit, and the other was destroyed at Chrysler's Chelsea Proving Grounds. A widely circulated explanation was that the cars were destroyed to avoid a substantial tariff on the imported Ghia bodies, although author Steve Lehto claims that this idea has been "largely discredited". The destruction of the cars was in line with the automobile industry's practice of not selling non-production or prototype cars to the public. According to Lehto, the decision was influenced by Chrysler's public relations concerns: the potential difficulty of keeping the cars running and fears that owners would replace the turbine powerplants with piston engines. A Chrysler executive was quoted in Look: "Our main objective is research, and we did not want turbines turning up on used-car lots." A similar practice was later used by General Motors with its EV1 when it terminated the program and destroyed most of the cars in 2003.

Chrysler's development of turbine engines continued from the late 1960s into the 1970s, resulting in the creation of fifth- and sixth-generation engines. The turbines ultimately failed to meet government emissions regulations and had relatively poor fuel economy, despite promising early results and a $6.4 million contract from the Environmental Protection Agency. According to Charles K. Hyde, the company's effort to enlarge and diversify its turbine program was unsuccessful and spread its "already-thin executive talent pool even thinner". An October 1967 Department of Commerce report concluded that the turbine engine was "unsuited to automobiles". Development continued on automotive turbines, in part because turbine exhaust contains fewer unburned hydrocarbons and lower concentrations of other pollutants. In March 1971, the Williams Research Corporation continued developing a turbine engine with funding from the National Air Pollution Control Administration. Chrysler's turbine engine development continued through the mid-1970s, with later compact versions of the engines installed in the Dodge Aspen. However, the program and the seventh-generation engine were discontinued in 1979 as a requirement of the Chrysler Corporation Loan Guarantee Act of 1979, as well as due to its inability to attain fuel economy goals. One Chrysler Turbine Car appeared in the 1964 film The Lively Set, painted white with blue racing stripes; it was the only Turbine Car not painted bronze.

Nine Chrysler Turbine Cars have survived. Initially, three were retained by Chrysler, two of which it still owns; six are on display at museums around the United States; and one is owned by a private collector. Chrysler has displayed one of its cars at the now closed Walter P. Chrysler Museum in Auburn Hills, Michigan. Five of the six cars on museum display were donated to the Detroit Historical Museum; the Henry Ford Museum in Dearborn, Michigan; the National Museum of Transportation in Kirkwood, Missouri; the Petersen Automotive Museum in Los Angeles; and the Smithsonian Institution in Washington, D.C. In 2005, the Detroit Historical Museum lent its car, which had been in warehouse storage, to the Gilmore Car Museum in Hickory Corners, Michigan. All the cars donated to museums had their fan assemblies removed to render their engines inoperable, although the car owned by the National Museum of Transportation was restored and returned to operating condition in the 1980s, allowing it to appear at car shows.

The sixth Chrysler Turbine Car on museum display has been owned by Stahls Automotive Collection in Chesterfield, Michigan, since being acquired at auction in March 2021. This car was originally donated to the former Harrah Collection in Reno, Nevada, later purchased by Domino's Pizza founder Tom Monaghan, and then sold to Frank Kleptz of Fort Wayne, Indiana. The only other Turbine Car ever to be privately owned is in the collection of comedian and television host Jay Leno, who purchased one of the three cars originally retained by Chrysler in 2009. Leno's car was featured in the BBC television show James May's Cars of the People. Both his car and the car now owned by Stahls Automotive Collection are operational.

=== Locations of surviving cars ===
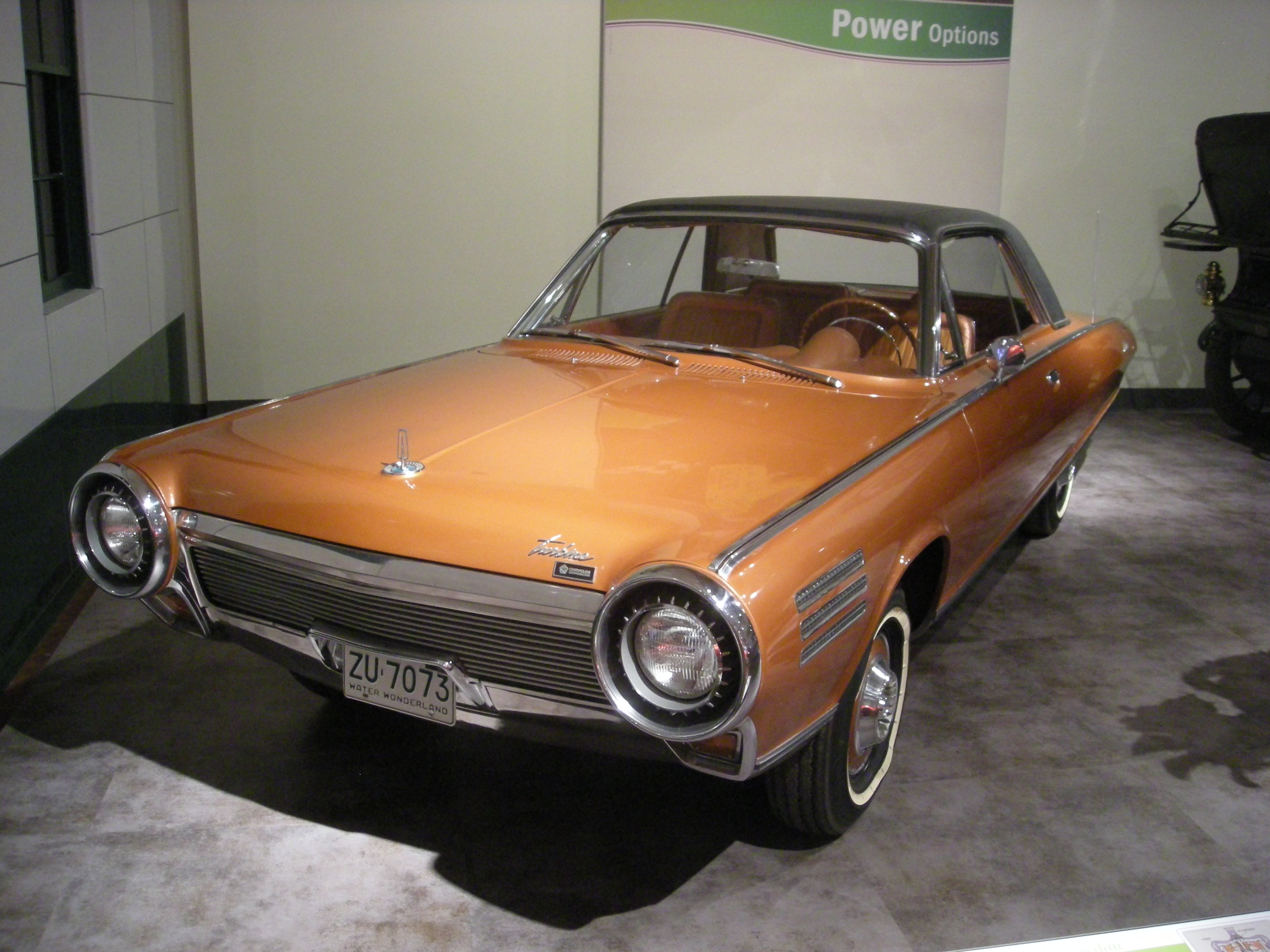
Chrysler Turbine Car at the Henry Ford Museum in Dearborn, Michigan

- #991211: National Museum of Transportation, Kirkwood, Missouri
- #991225: Detroit Historical Museum, Detroit, Michigan
- #991230: Walter P. Chrysler Museum, Auburn Hills, Michigan
- #991231: Stahls Automotive Collection in Chesterfield, Michigan (formerly in Frank Kleptz's private collection in Indiana)
- #991234: Henry Ford Museum, Dearborn, Michigan
- #991242: Jay Leno's private collection in California (formerly at the Walter P. Chrysler Museum, Auburn Hills, Michigan)
- #991244: Petersen Automotive Museum, Los Angeles, California
- #991245: Smithsonian Institution, Washington, D.C.
- #991247: Walter P. Chrysler Museum, Auburn Hills, Michigan

== Other gas-turbine concept cars ==
- EcoJet concept car
- Fiat Turbina
- General Motors Firebird
- Jaguar C-X75
- Renault Étoile Filante
- Rover JET1
- Rover-BRM
- Toyota GTV

== Sources ==
- Hyde, Charles K. (2003). Riding the Roller Coaster: A History of the Chrysler Corporation. Wayne State University Press. ISBN 0-8143-3091-6.
- Lehto, Steve (2010). Chrysler's Turbine Car: The Rise and Fall of Detroit's Coolest Creation. Chicago Review Press. ISBN 978-1-56976-771-9.
- Norbye, Jan P. (1975). The Gas Turbine Engine: Design, Development, Applications. Chilton. ISBN 0-8019-5753-2.
