= Chrysler turbine engine =

Series of gas turbine engines developed by Chrysler

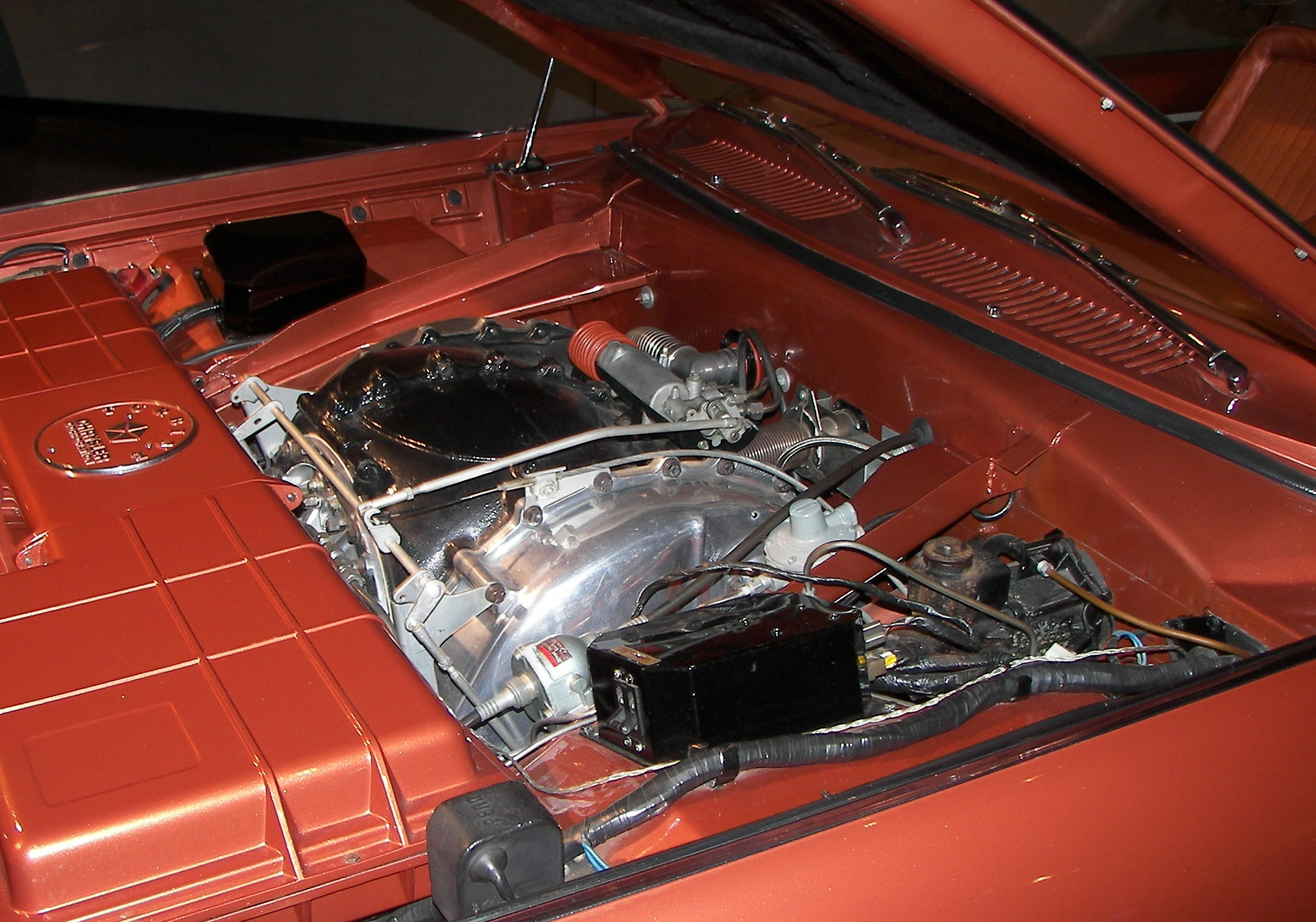
Engine compartment of a 1963 Chrysler Turbine automobile

The Chrysler turbine engine is a series of gas turbine engines developed by Chrysler intended to be used in road vehicles. In 1954, Chrysler Corporation disclosed the development and successful road testing of a production model Plymouth sport coupe which was powered by a turbine engine.

== Development ==
Tests of the Chrysler Turbine were first run in 1954 and proved successful enough to convince project lead George Huebner of the engine's viability for further development.

With the aim of keeping price competitive with its contemporaries, the team sought to address concerns with the engine of throttle response and noise, and to see if it was even possible to power a car using a jet engine. Likewise, new materials were developed to be resistant to the high temperatures of the engine's combustion chamber while remaining economical to manufacture at the scale of a mass-produced automobile.

A number of benefits were also identified; the turbine engine being conceptually simpler than a piston engine drove an attendant reduction in parts count from the roughly 300 of a typical engine to only 60. This resulted principally in a longer engine life, longer service intervals, and substantially improved power density over a conventional engine of comparable output. Numerous factors of the turbine's performance were identified as superior to its piston contemporaries – particularly ease of cold starting, reduced noise and vibration, and a resistance to stalling under sudden load.

== Testing ==
The first successful test of a gas turbine engine in a car (CR1) took place in 1954 at Chrysler's testing grounds. In 1956, the first successful cross-country trip using a turbine-engined car took place using a Plymouth Belvedere.

Further engineering work resulted in the second generation (CR2), which improved fuel economy and increased horsepower.

In 1961, a third-generation engine (CR2A) was installed in a 1962 Dodge Dart, which successfully drove from New York City to Los Angeles, through snowstorms, rain and heavy winds.

The fourth-generation engine, installed in the Chrysler Turbine Car, was put into use in 1963. This engine runs at up to 44,500 revolutions per minute, according to the owner's manual, and could operate using diesel fuel, unleaded gasoline, kerosene, JP-4 jet fuel, and even vegetable oil. The engine can run on virtually anything with combustible properties and "Chrysler claimed the turbine could gulp everything from peanut oil to Chanel No. 5." The then-incumbent President of Mexico tested this theory by running one of the first cars—successfully—on tequila, after Chrysler engineers confirmed that the car would operate successfully. No air/fuel adjustments are required to switch from one fuel type to another and the only evidence of which fuel was used is the odor of the exhaust.

The turbine spins on simple sleeve bearings for vibration-free running. Its simplicity offers the potential for long life, and because no combustion contaminants enter engine oil, no oil changes are considered necessary. The 1963 Turbine's engine generated 130 brake horsepower (97 kW; 132 PS) and an instant 425 pound force-feet (576 N⋅m) of torque at stall speed, making it good for 0 to 60 mph (0 to 97 km/h) in 12 seconds at an ambient temperature of 85 °F (29 °C)—it can sprint quicker if the ambient air was cooler and denser.

The lack of many moving parts and the lack of liquid coolant eases maintenance, while the exhaust does not contain carbon monoxide, uncombusted carbon, or raw hydrocarbons. Nevertheless, the turbine generates nitrogen oxides and the challenge of limiting them proved an ongoing problem throughout development.

The power turbine is connected, without a torque converter, through a gear reduction unit to an only moderately modified TorqueFlite automatic transmission. The flow of the combustion gases between the gas generator and free power turbine provides the same functionality as a torque converter but without using a conventional liquid medium. Twin rotating recuperators transfer exhaust heat to the inlet air, greatly improving fuel economy. Varying stator blades prevent excessive top end speeds and provide engine braking on deceleration.

Throttle lag and exhaust gas temperatures at idle plagued generations 1 and 2; Chrysler was able to remedy or mitigate these to some degree. Acceleration lag, however, remained a problem, and fuel consumption was excessive, although it improved with each generation. Acceleration was excellent provided the turbine was spun up (by applying power) prior to releasing the brakes. The Turbine Car also featured a fully stainless steel exhaust system, the exits of which were flat in cross section. This was intended to spread the exhaust gases thinly and thus cool them further, in order to allow the vehicle to stand in traffic without risking damage to following traffic. The combustor, or burner, was primitive by the standards of modern turbojet engines. A single reverse-flow canister featuring a more-or-less standard spark plug for ignition was employed. Had the engine been further developed, annular combustion chambers along with a second power turbine might have improved power and economy even more. The transmission has an "idle" position instead of "neutral".

After the user testing period completed, Chrysler collected all of the cars, destroying 40 out of the original 50. Chrysler kept two, then sent the remaining examples to museums.

== Later development and project end ==
Chrysler's turbine engine program did not end with the Chrysler Turbine Car. A new coupe body, which was to become the 1966 Dodge Charger was considered for a new fifth-generation turbine engine. However, Chrysler went on to develop a sixth generation gas-turbine engine which finally met US nitrogen oxide regulations, and installed it in a 1966 Dodge Coronet, though it was never introduced to the public.

A smaller, lighter, seventh generation engine was produced in the early 1970s, when the company received a grant from the United States Environmental Protection Agency (EPA) for further development, and a one-off, special bodied, turbine Chrysler LeBaron was built in 1977 as a prelude to a production run. However, by 1978 the company was encountering significant financial difficulties and new CEO Lee Iacocca needed U.S. government loan guarantees to avoid bankruptcy. A government condition of that 1979 deal was that the gas-turbine program be abandoned because they believed it was "too risky" for an auto company of Chrysler's size.

While the automotive division of Chrysler never mass-produced a turbine powered vehicle, Chrysler Defense (later General Dynamics Land Systems) would ultimately employ the unrelated Honeywell AGT1500 in the M1 Abrams Main Battle Tank.

== Engine series ==
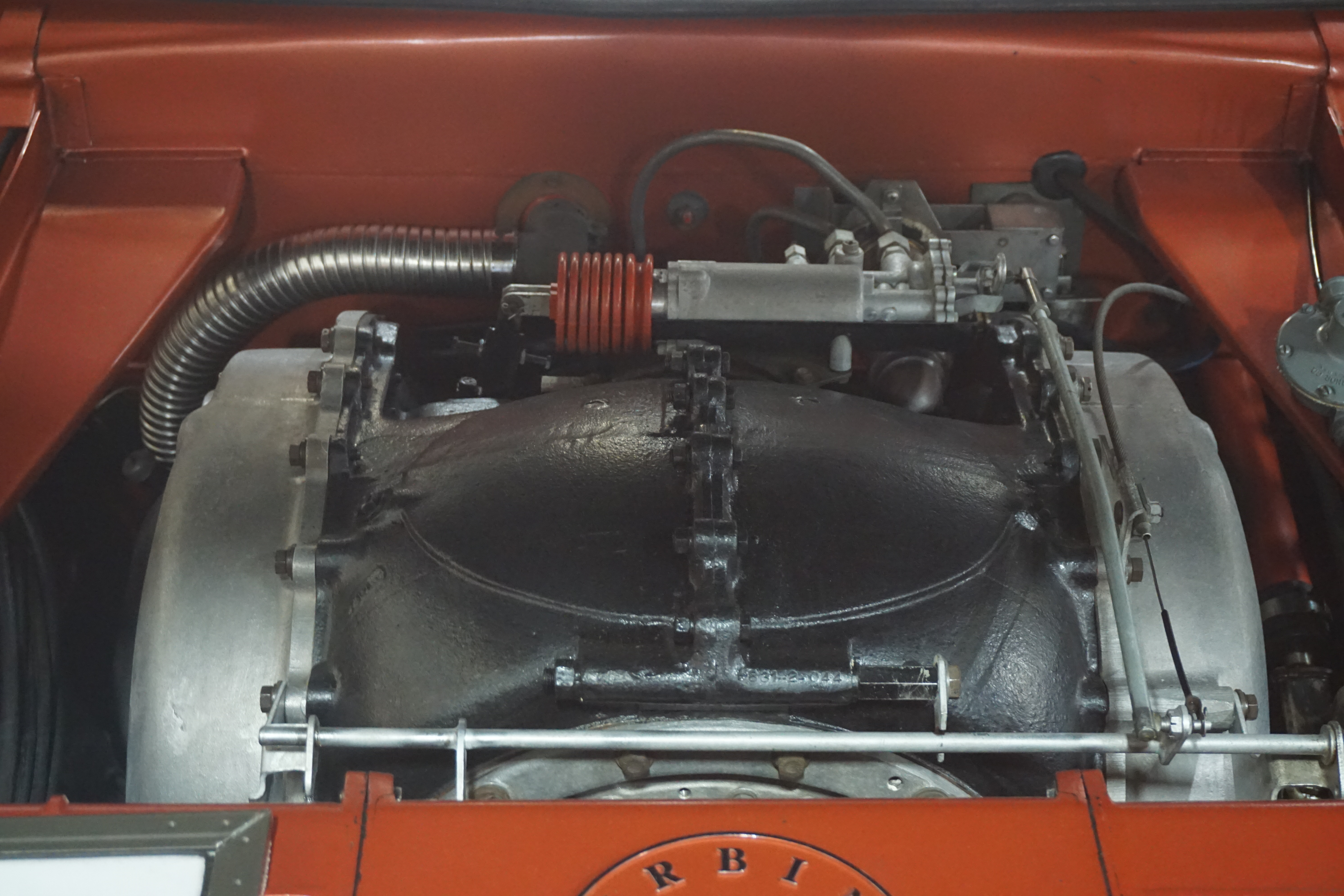
1963 Chrysler Turbine Car engine at Stahls Automotive Collection

- CR1 1954–1956: Plymouth Belvedere 4-door
  - ~100 hp (75 kW)
  - No engine braking
  - Slow spool up
- CR2 1956–1957: 1956 Plymouth Belvedere, 1957 Plymouth Fury
  - Better regenerator
  - Better fuel economy (18 US mpg)
- CR2A 1960–1962: 1960 Plymouth Fury, 1962 Plymouth Fury (2), 1962 Dodge Dart (2), 1961 Dodge 2½ ton stake
  - Turboflite show car
  - 140 hp (104 kW), 375 lbf·ft (508 N·m)
  - Adjustable nozzle blades
- A831 1963–1966: 1963 Chrysler Turbine Cars (50)
  - 130 hp (97 kW), 425 lbf·ft (576 N·m)
  - Much less lag
  - 50 cars + 5 prototypes. All but nine were destroyed.
  - Surviving examples, location and operational status
    - #991211 - National Museum of Transportation, St. Louis, Missouri – Active
    - #991225 - Gilmore Car Museum, Hickory Corners, Michigan – Inactive
    - #991230 - Walter P. Chrysler Museum, Auburn Hills, Michigan – Active
    - #991231 - Private Collection in Terre Haute, Indiana – Active
    - #991234 - Henry Ford Museum, Dearborn, Michigan – Inactive
    - #991242 - Jay Leno Private Collection in Burbank, California – Active (Rebuilt after failure)
    - #991244 - Los Angeles County Natural History Museum, Los Angeles, California – Inactive
    - #991245 - Smithsonian Institution, Washington, D.C. – Inactive
    - #991247 - Walter P. Chrysler Museum, Auburn Hills, Michigan – Active
- A875 1964: 1964 Plymouth Furys (2)
  - Same as A831 but with larger regenerators
- Gen6 1964–1973: Prototype Dodge Charger, 1966 Dodge Coronet, 1973 B-Body sedans (3)
  - Same as A875 but with split accessory drive
- Gen7 Coupe 1977: 1976 4-door Dodge Aspen (3), Concept F-body 79 Mirada, Concept 1980 Chrysler Lebaron
  - 104 hp (78 kW) (could be raised to 125 hp (93 kW))

== See also ==
- Sam B. Williams
- Williams International
- GM Whirlfire engine, comparable series of contemporaneous prototype engines
