= Chrysler Museum =

Chrysler Museum may refer to:

- Chrysler Museum of Art in Norfolk, Virginia
- Walter P. Chrysler Museum in Auburn Hills, Michigan
