= The Lively Set =

1964 film by Jack Arnold

- 1964 theatrical poster
- Directed by: Jack Arnold
- Screenplay by: Mel Goldberg; William Wood
- Story by: Mel Goldberg; William Alland
- Produced by: William Alland
- Starring: James Darren; Pamela Tiffin; Doug McClure; Joanie Sommers
- Cinematography: Carl E. Guthrie (as Carl Guthrie)
- Edited by: Archie Marshek
- Music by: Bobby Darin
- Production company: Universal Pictures
- Distributed by: Universal Pictures
- Release date: October 24, 1964
- Running time: 95 minutes
- Country: United States
- Language: English

The Lively Set is a 1964 American color action drama sport film directed by Jack Arnold and starring James Darren, Pamela Tiffin, Doug McClure and Joanie Sommers.

== Plot ==
Casey Owens, a young mechanic, has developed a design for a turbine car engine, paving the way for a jet-powered auto certain to set a new land speed record. Wealthy playboy Stanford Rogers hires Casey to build the car for him to race in the Tri-State Endurance Run. Chuck Manning, an engineering student whom Casey had met in a drag race, discovers potential flaws in the car's design. After an unsuccessful test run, Rogers abandons the turbine-powered car for a traditional racing model, but Casey and Chuck rework the turbine vehicle to compete with Rogers in the endurance run. Chuck's sister Eadie becomes Casey's love interest.

== Cast ==
- James Darren as Casey Owens
- Pamela Tiffin as Eadie Manning
- Doug McClure as Chuck Manning
- Joanie Sommers as Doreen Grey
- Marilyn Maxwell as Marge Owens
- Charles Drake as Paul Manning
- Peter Mann as Stanford Rogers
- Carole Wells as Mona
- Frances Robinson as Celeste Manning
- Greg Morris as Highway Patrol Officer
- Ross Elliott as Ernie Owens
- Russ Conway as Dave Moody
- Martin Blaine as Professor George E. Collins
- Max Schumacher as Himself (credited as Captain Max Schumancher)
- Dick Whittinghill as Himself
- Mickey Thompson as Himself
- James Nelson as Himself
- Duane Carter as Himself
- Billy Krause as Himself
- Ron Miller as Himself
- Dave MacDonald as Himself

== Production ==
Filming started on 20 January 1964. It was the first film Darren made under a multi-picture film contract he had signed with Universal, for whom he was to make a film a year until 1970, in addition to a Columbia contract for one film per year until 1966. Racing scenes were shot on location at Bonneville Salt Flats, Pomona Dragstrip, and Death Valley National Park.

Bobby Darin was hired to write three songs for the film, but Universal was so pleased with the results that they enlisted him to write the entire score.

The film's release, originally set for July 1964, was delayed until October, and the film was heavily edited out of respect for Dave MacDonald, who played himself and was a stunt driver in the film. MacDonald died on May 30, 1964, during the Indianapolis 500 in a fiery crash that also killed Eddie Sachs, who had also been in some scenes, during the second lap. Scenes featuring Sachs and all but one scene featuring MacDonald were removed from the film, and neither driver's name appears in the on-screen credits. Some years later, MacDonald's son Rich contacted James Darren to put his father's name in the Internet Movie Database (IMDb). Chrysler mechanic George Stecher appeared in reshot scenes that had originally featured MacDonald.

== The turbine car ==
The turbine car used in the film is the famous 1963 Chrysler Ghia Turbine Car developed by George Huebner and his team. The car's engine is realistically described in the film, particularly Chrysler's use of heat regenerators, which cooled the car's exhaust to a temperature even lower than that of a traditional piston engine.

The Chrysler Turbine Car is mentioned in the opening credits of the film. Chrysler participated in the film's development as the car was its exclusive property and the patented engine design was extensively advertised as the "engine of the future."

== Reception ==
The film was released in late October 1964 and received mixed reviews. The Los Angeles Times called the film "... the most awful little time waster."

Writing in The New York Times, critic Eugene Arthur wrote, "By the fadeout, everyone up there on the screen is positively beaming with joy. Before congratulating them on their acting ability, though, remember that they, unlike the helpless customers, were paid."

== Awards ==
The Lively Set was nominated at the 37th Academy Awards for Best Sound Editing (Robert Bratton). It won the Golden Reel Award for Best Sound Editing for a Feature Film.
