= William Wood (screenwriter) =

American screenwriter

- Occupation: Screenwriter

William Wood is an American screenwriter. Along with Mel Goldberg, he co-wrote the 1964 film The Lively Set, starring James Darren, Pamela Tiffin, Doug McClure and Joanie Summers. Aside from his work on The Lively Set, he wrote for the television programs including Mission: Impossible, Cimarron City, Room 222, Here Come the Brides, Ben Casey, The Fugitive, The Mod Squad, Dan August and The Greatest Show on Earth.
