= James May's Cars of the People =

- Title card. International variations feature a second logo beneath which reads: "A BBC Top Gear special."
- Also known as: Cars of the People
- Genre: Factual; Motoring
- Based on: Top Gear
- Written by: James May; Tom Whitter; Henry Dalton
- Directed by: Tom Whitter
- Presented by: James May
- Country of origin: United Kingdom
- Original language: English
- No. of series: 2
- No. of episodes: 6

Production
- Executive producer: Tom Whitter
- Producers: Tom Whitter; Henry Dalton
- Editors: Henry Dalton; Greg Coyne
- Running time: 60 minutes
- Production company: BBC

Original release
- Network: BBC Two HD
- Release: 10 August 2014 – 7 February 2016

Cars of the People is a series of spin-off factual programmes of the BBC Two factual television series Top Gear, presented by James May, which looks at how the motor vehicle became an everyday part of human life.

== Broadcast ==
Although billed as a stand-alone series in the United Kingdom, international broadcasts are billed as special episodes of Top Gear, designed to bridge the gap between the broadcast of each series. Each episode is filmed in the same style as Top Gear, with many of the same cast and crew, as well as featuring jokes which relate to events or sequences in the parent series. Additionally, the title cards for the series are based on those for Top Gear.

The first series of three episodes began on 10 August 2014, bridging the gap between Series 21 and 22 of Top Gear. A second series of three episodes was set to be broadcast in 2015; but was indefinitely delayed due to the scandal which saw presenter Jeremy Clarkson dropped from the parent series, which in turn led to the departures of both Richard Hammond and May. The second series was eventually broadcast in January 2016. May subsequently confirmed that no further episodes would be produced due to his commitment to Amazon Prime Video.

== Episodes ==
=== Series overview ===
Series	Episodes	Originally released		Avg. viewers (millions)
Series	Episodes	First released	Last released	Avg. viewers (millions)
1	3	10 August 2014	24 August 2014	2.40
2	3	24 January 2016	7 February 2016	2.17

=== Series 1 (2014) ===
No.	Title	Original release date	U.K. viewers (millions)
1	"Dictators Moving the Masses"	10 August 2014	2.43
In his quest to discover how we, the people, got our wheels, James travels to Germany, Italy and Russia to reveal the extraordinary story of how dictators kickstarted the mobilisation of the masses. James investigates the increasing popularity of the Volkswagen Beetle in 1940s' Germany; how East German dictatorships lead to the production of the Trabant and Wartburg; and reveals how the Fiat 124 and derivatives became one of the best selling cars in the world.
2	"Microcars & Vans"	17 August 2014	2.60
James May downsizes to explore the weird world of the microcar. He discovers how austerity and fears of congestion led to European tragicomic disasters in the shape of Britain's infamous three-wheelers, French deathtraps and German absurdities. He also takes to the battlefield to settle one of the greatest rivalries in car history between the Citroën 2CV and the Renault 4 and travels to Japan for an urban race between a Daihatsu Copen Kei car and the best-selling vehicle in history, the Honda Super Cub.
3	"Climbing the Social Ladder"	24 August 2014	2.16
This episode is all about power and glory as James reveals the cars that finally gave the people hope. From the Rolls-Royce that became a people's champion to the blue-collar heroes that launched a thousand burn ups, James reveals how aspiration and new wealth would drive the development of some of the greatest cars ever made. He learns how the Rolls-Royce Silver Shadow turned from a car of the hierarchy to a car of the people; sets out to discover whether Ford or Vauxhall make the perfect businessman's car; takes two much loved cars from his childhood, the Lamborghini Countach and the Porsche 911 Turbo, out for a spin in Oxford; and reveals his choice for the "perfect people's car" - the Volkswagen Golf.

=== Series 2 (2016) ===
No.	Title	Original release date	U.K. viewers (millions)
4	"Post-War Boom (and Bust)"	24 January 2016	2.20
James reveals the cars that turned postwar Germany and Japan into motoring powerhouses at the expense of Britain and the US. On his travels he encounters classic E-Types, Mustangs and the German and Japanese upstarts that were to conquer the world. He also has an unfortunate encounter with an Austin Allegro - the car that helped destroy the British car industry. James investigates the post-war boom (and bust) of both the British and American car industries; races Damon Hill to put to bed a childhood argument—which is faster—a Jaguar E-Type or a Datsun 260Z; and takes both a Ford Mustang and Toyota Celica for a spin to see which is better for fuel economy.
5	"4x4"	31 January 2016	2.09
James May goes off-road to tell the story of how the 4x4 conquered the world. From the wartime jeep to the global struggle between Land Rover and Land Cruiser, the white-knuckle world of rallying and boy racers, plus James conquers Mount Fuji and races through the sun-scorched Mojave Desert to decide which is the ultimate people's 4x4. He investigates the history of the 4x4, including the birth of the Land Rover and the Toyota Land Cruiser; challenges production operatives from Ford and Toyota to a race across the Mojave Desert; and looks at the birth of the Audi Quattro, and how it evolved from a rally champion into a roadworthy legend.
6	"Steam Power"	7 February 2016	2.21
James explores the wilder shores of motoring to discover what happened to the cars of the future that we were promised. From improbable steam cars and ludicrous jet turbines, he reveals how the petrol engine and the power it gave us came to dominate the 20th century. He takes to the waves in an amphibious car, risks his life at the wheel of a notorious electric scooter and takes a hair-raising trip in the fastest driverless car on earth. James looks at how steam power came to influence the birth of the petrol engine; takes a ride in a limited edition last of its kind 1963 Chrysler Turbine Car with owner Jay Leno; explores the ongoing battle between Porsche and TVR; and takes the first ever amphibious car for a spin in the Pembrokeshire lakes.

== Home media ==
The first series was released on DVD in Australia on 5 August 2015.
