= The Greatest Show on Earth (TV series) =

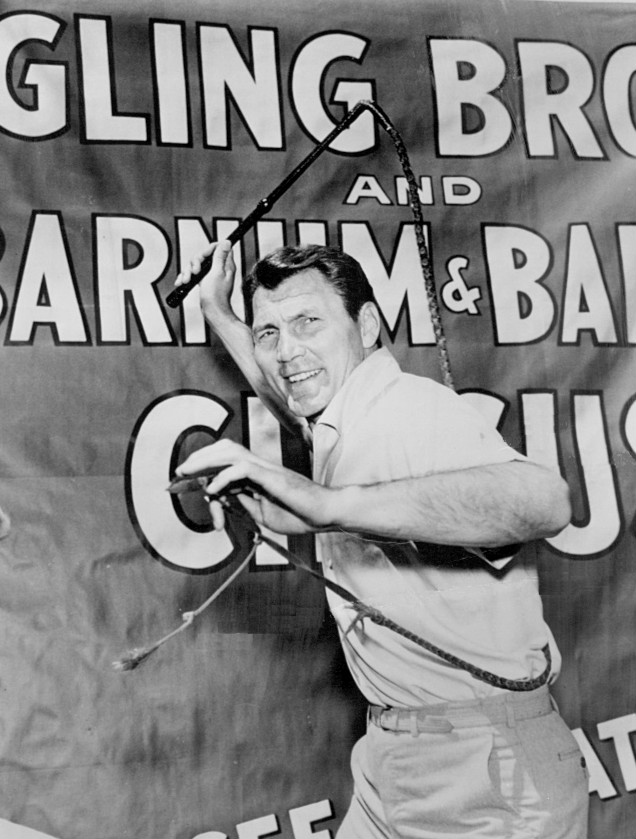
- Jack Palance as Johnny Slate
- Genre: Drama
- Written by: Neil Bernstein; Calvin Clements; Meyer Dolinski; Fenton Hobart, Jr. Paul Mason; Bob Rafelson; Jason Wingreen; William Wood
- Directed by: Arthur Hiller; Leslie H. Martinson; Vincent McEveety; Jack Palance
- Starring: Jack Palance; Stuart Erwin
- Theme music composer: Richard Rodgers
- Opening theme: "March of the Clowns"
- Composers: Jeff Alexander; Wilbur Hatch; Paul Smith
- Country of origin: United States
- Original language: English
- No. of seasons: 1
- No. of episodes: 30

Production
- Producer: Stanley Colbert
- Camera setup: Single-camera
- Running time: 48 mins.
- Production companies: Cody Productions; Desilu Productions; Ringling Bros. and Barnum and Bailey Television

Original release
- Network: ABC
- Release: September 17, 1963 – April 28, 1964

The Greatest Show on Earth is an American drama series starring Jack Palance about the American circus, which aired on ABC from September 17, 1963, to September 8, 1964. It was produced by Desilu, the production company founded by Lucille Ball and Desi Arnaz.

== Plot ==
The show was based on the 1952 film of the same name. Palance portrayed Johnny Slate, the boss of a circus. Stu Erwin played Otto King, whose money financed the circus. Episodes focused on various kinds of performers from week to week, with Slate trying to maintain peace among the different groups.

== Guest stars ==
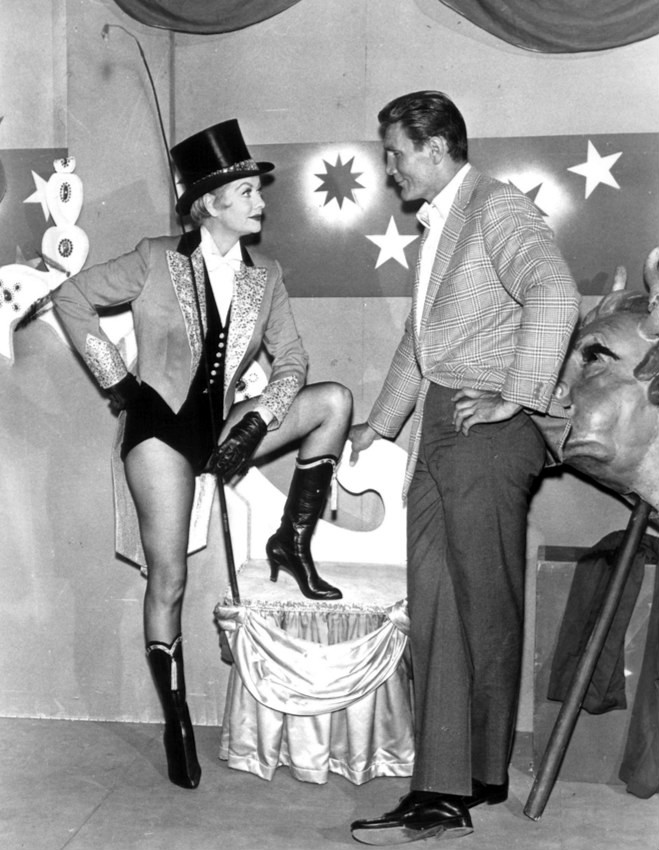
Guest star Lucille Ball whose company Desilu Productions produced the series), and Jack Palance in the episode "Lady in Limbo"

- Don Ameche
- John Astin
- Lucille Ball
- Edgar Bergen
- Joan Blondell
- Patricia Breslin
- Geraldine Brooks
- Joe E. Brown
- Ellen Burstyn
- Red Buttons
- Spring Byington
- Rory Calhoun
- James Coburn
- Yvonne De Carlo
- William Demarest
- Bruce Dern
- Brandon deWilde
- Tony Dow
- Bill Erwin
- Stuart Erwin
- Fabian
- José Ferrer
- Nina Foch
- Anthony Franciosa
- Annette Funicello
- Billy Gray
- Dabbs Greer
- Dwayne Hickman
- Michael Hinn
- Dennis Hopper
- Betty Hutton
- Buster Keaton
- Ruby Keeler
- Russell Johnson
- Jack Lord
- Dorothy Malone
- Ricardo Montalbán
- Joanna Moore
- Agnes Moorehead
- Bill Mumy
- Barry Nelson
- Julie Newmar
- Sheree North
- Edmond O'Brien
- Cliff Robertson
- Ruth Roman
- Dean Stockwell
- Russ Tamblyn
- Russell Thorson
- Brenda Vaccaro
- Deborah Walley
- Tuesday Weld
- James Whitmore

== Episodes ==
No.	Title	Original release date
1	"Lion on Fire"	September 17, 1963
2	"Silent Love, Secret Love"	September 24, 1963
3	"No Middle Ground For Harry Kyle"	October 1, 1963
4	"Don't Look Down, Don't Look Back"	October 8, 1963
5	"Garve"	October 15, 1963
6	"The Loser"	October 22, 1963
7	"Uncaged"	October 29, 1963
8	"The Circus Never Came To Town"	November 5, 1963
9	"An Echo of Faded Velvet"	November 12, 1963
10	"The Hanging Man"	November 19, 1963
11	"Leaves In the Wind"	November 26, 1963
12	"The Wrecker"	December 3, 1963
13	"Lady in Limbo"	December 10, 1963
14	"A Black Dress for Gina"	December 17, 1963
15	"Where the Wire Ends"	January 7, 1964
16	"Corsicans Don't Cry"	January 14, 1964
17	"Big Man From Nairobi"	January 21, 1964
18	"The Show Must Go On – To Orange City"	January 28, 1964
19	"A Place to Belong"	February 11, 1964
20	"Man In a Hole"	February 18, 1964
21	"Clancy"	February 25, 1964
22	"The Last of the Strongmen"	March 3, 1964
23	"The Night the Monkey Died"	March 10, 1964
24	"Of Blood, Sawdust, and a Bucket of Tears"	March 17, 1964
25	"Rosetta"	March 24, 1964
26	"The Glorious Days of the Used to Be"	March 31, 1964
27	"Love the Giver"	April 7, 1964
28	"This Train Don't Stop Till It Gets There"	April 14, 1964
29	"There Are No Problems, Only Opportunities"	April 21, 1964
30	"You're All Right, Ivy"	April 28, 1964

== Production ==
Stanley Colbert was the producer. Don Richardson was the director, and William Wood was the writer. Members of the Ringling Bros. and Barnum & Bailey Circus performed regularly on the show. Sponsored by Kaiser, American Tobacco, and Alberto-Culver, the program was Desilu's first color series.

The Greatest Show on Earth faced competition from two comedy programs on CBS: Petticoat Junction and The Jack Benny Program. NBC aired The Richard Boone Show at the same 9 p.m. Tuesday slot. The series was canceled after one season.

The final episode, "You're All Right, Ivy," starring Buster Keaton, also happened to be the only episode Jack Palance directed, as well as the one and only time he ever directed anything.

== Critical response ==
The trade publication Sponsor said that although The Greatest Show on Earth had "great dramatic possibilities", it was "really a simple adventure yarn if you strip the three rings away".

A review of the premiere episode in the trade publication Variety said that the circus aspect was secondary "while a somewhat unbelievable drama hogged the center ring spotlight". The review added that the episode's acting was implausible, with "hardly a person present one would readily identify as a circus character".
