= Rover T3 =

Gas turbine-powered coupé

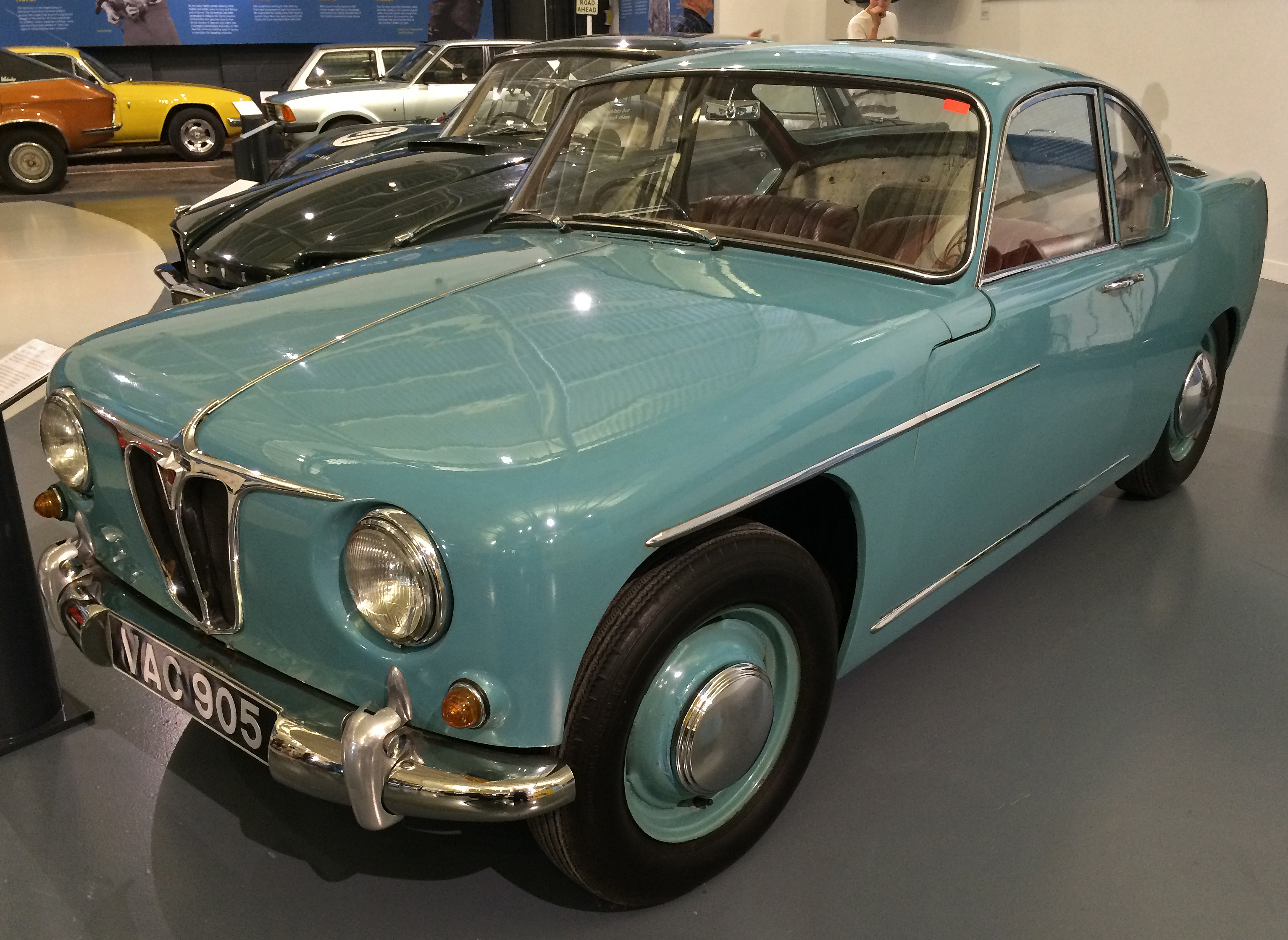
- Rover T3 Gas Turbine Coupe (1956)

Overview
- Manufacturer: Rover Company
- Production: 1956
- Assembly: Solihull plant
- Designer: Charles Spencer King and Gordon Bashford

Body and chassis
- Class: Prototype
- Body style: Coupé

Powertrain
- Engine: Gas turbine

Dimensions
- Length: 3,700 mm (145.7 in)
- Width: 1,550 mm (61.0 in)
- Height: 1,250 mm (49.2 in)

Chronology
- Predecessor: Rover T2A
- Successor: Rover T4

Rover T3 is a gas turbine-powered coupé developed in the 1950s by the Rover Company. Showcasing Britain's leading role in the development of this new technology, the Rover T3 was launched at the Earls Court Motor Show in November 1956 (stand 153)., which was captured on film by British Pathé. The T3 coupé was Rover’s third turbine car, designed by Charles Spencer King and Gordon Bashford.

== Background ==
Rover had begun developing gas turbine passenger vehicles after World War II. Their first attempt was Rover JET1, a two-seater convertible from 1949/50.

== Engine ==
The modified Rover 2S/100 gas turbine has a single combustion chamber and a single centrifugal compressor which rotates at up to a maximum of 52,000 rpm. A free turbine drives the output shaft, separate from the compressor turbine. The T3 retained the two pedal operation from the JET1 prototype - one pedal to accelerate and one to brake.

The engine is rated at 110 bhp and capable of 100 mph (161 km/h).

== Body ==
The chassis incorporates four-wheel-drive and De Dion tube rear suspension and all around inboard Dunlop disk brakes. The fully-developed T3 carries a blue glass-fibre coupé body.

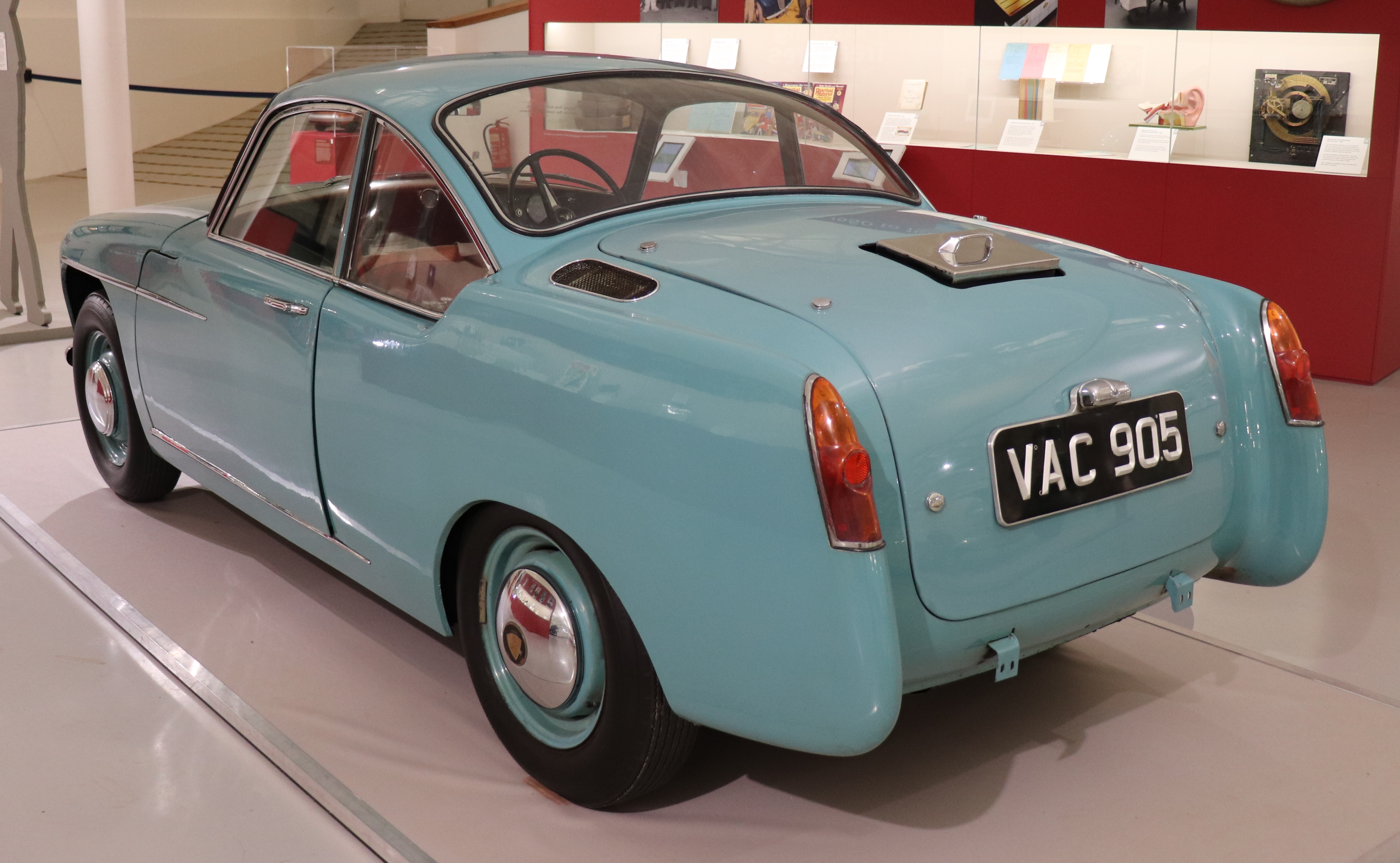
Rover T3 (rear view)

== Survival today ==
The Rover T3 became part of the BMIHT collection and in recent years has been on display at the British Motor Museum, Gaydon.

== Rover T3 base unit ==
The Rover T3 base unit is a gas turbine-powered development mule, developed in the early 1950s by the Rover Company. It was the engineering test car for the 1956 T3 coupé, Rover’s third turbine car.

Essentially mechanically identical to the finished coupé, its simple body allowed for the easy change of turbine units and other components. The chassis incorporates four-wheel-drive and De Dion tube rear suspension, clothed in a rudimentary steel panel body. Perhaps surprising for an engineering test mule, the vehicle has luxurious blue leather seats.

The Rover T3 base unit was stored for over 50 years after engineering development work had been completed in the 1960s

During 2018, restoration began by the same dedicated team of volunteers that worked on the Rover-BRM. The T3 base unit was first demonstrated at the Museum's Gaydon Gathering event in August 2022.

== See also ==
- Rover-BRM
- Rover JET1
