= Rover-BRM =

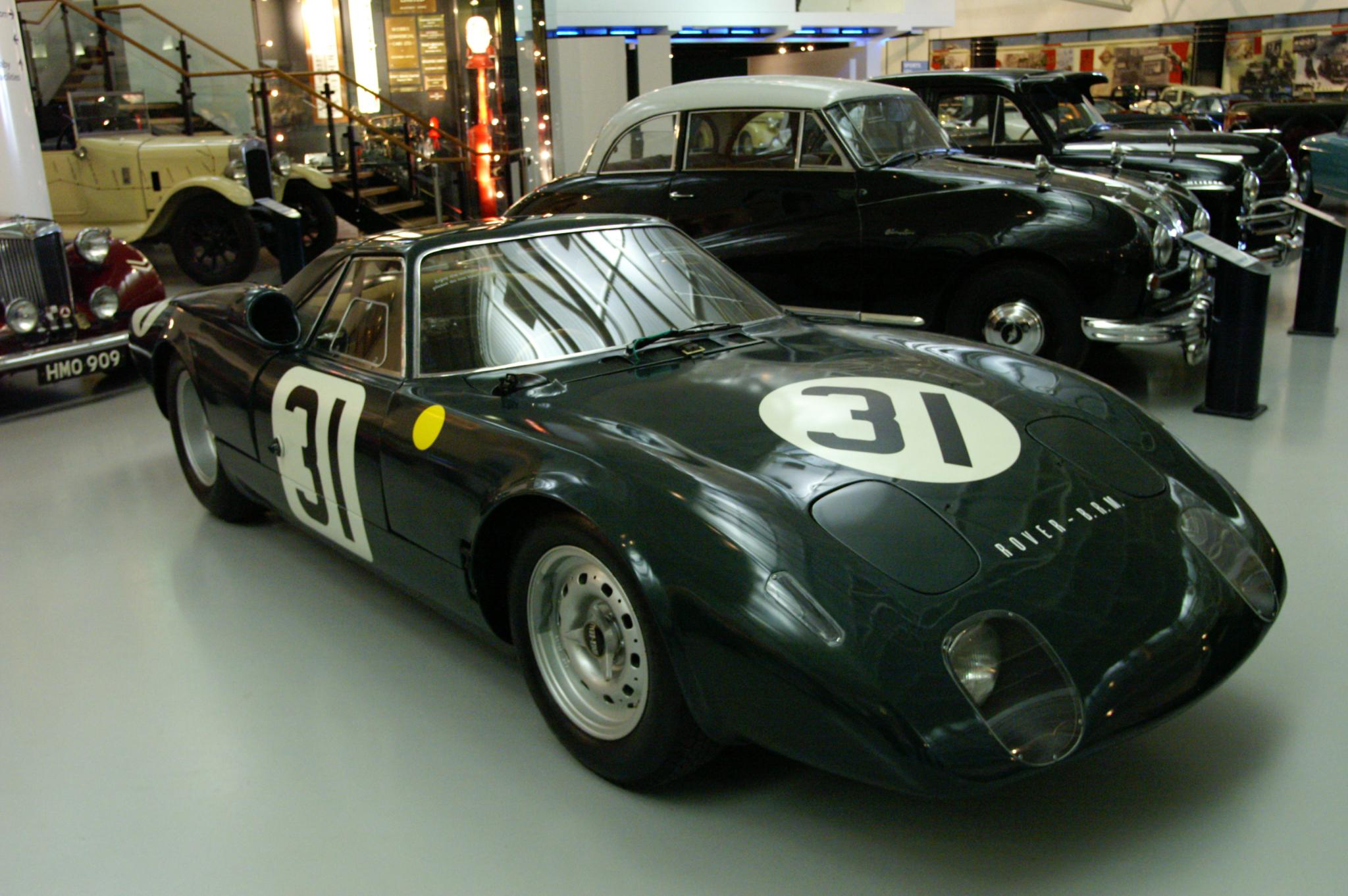

Overview
- Manufacturer: Rover, British Racing Motors (BRM).
- Production: 1963–1965
- Designer: William Towns, David Bache

Powertrain
- Engine: Gas turbine

The Rover-BRM was a prototype gas turbine-powered racing car, jointly developed in the early 1960s by the British companies Rover and British Racing Motors (BRM). The car is part of the collection at the British Motor Museum.

Rover had already been working with gas turbines for road vehicles since World War II. A series of potential road cars were also produced, starting with the early prototype Jet 1, through the more developed examples T2 and T3, followed by the T4, which performed demonstration laps around the Le Mans circuit before the 1962 race. Seeing an opportunity for even more prestige, Rover decided to enter a gas turbine car into the race. A prize was to be awarded for the first gas turbine car to complete 3,600 km over the 24 hours, an average speed of 150 km/h, approximately 93 mph.

A crucial step in this plan was a chance meeting between William Martin-Hurst, MD of Rover, and Sir Alfred Owen of Rover's component supplier Rubery Owen, but more relevantly also of the Formula 1 constructors BRM. BRM supplied the chassis of Richie Ginther's crash-damaged car from the 1962 Monaco Grand Prix. A custom open-top spyder body was then built in aluminium, with the turbine mid-mounted ahead of a single-speed transaxle.

The first test runs were at the MIRA track in April 1963, driven by Graham Hill who described it thus, "You’re sitting in this thing that you might call a motor car and the next minute it sounds as if you’ve got a 707 just behind you, about to suck you up and devour you like an enormous monster." The top speed is quoted to be 142 mph (229 km/h)

== Engine ==
The gas turbine engine was of typical practice for Rover, with a single centrifugal compressor, a single combustion chamber and a free turbine driving the output shaft, separate from the turbine that drove the compressor. It was rated at 150 bhp.

== Racing career ==
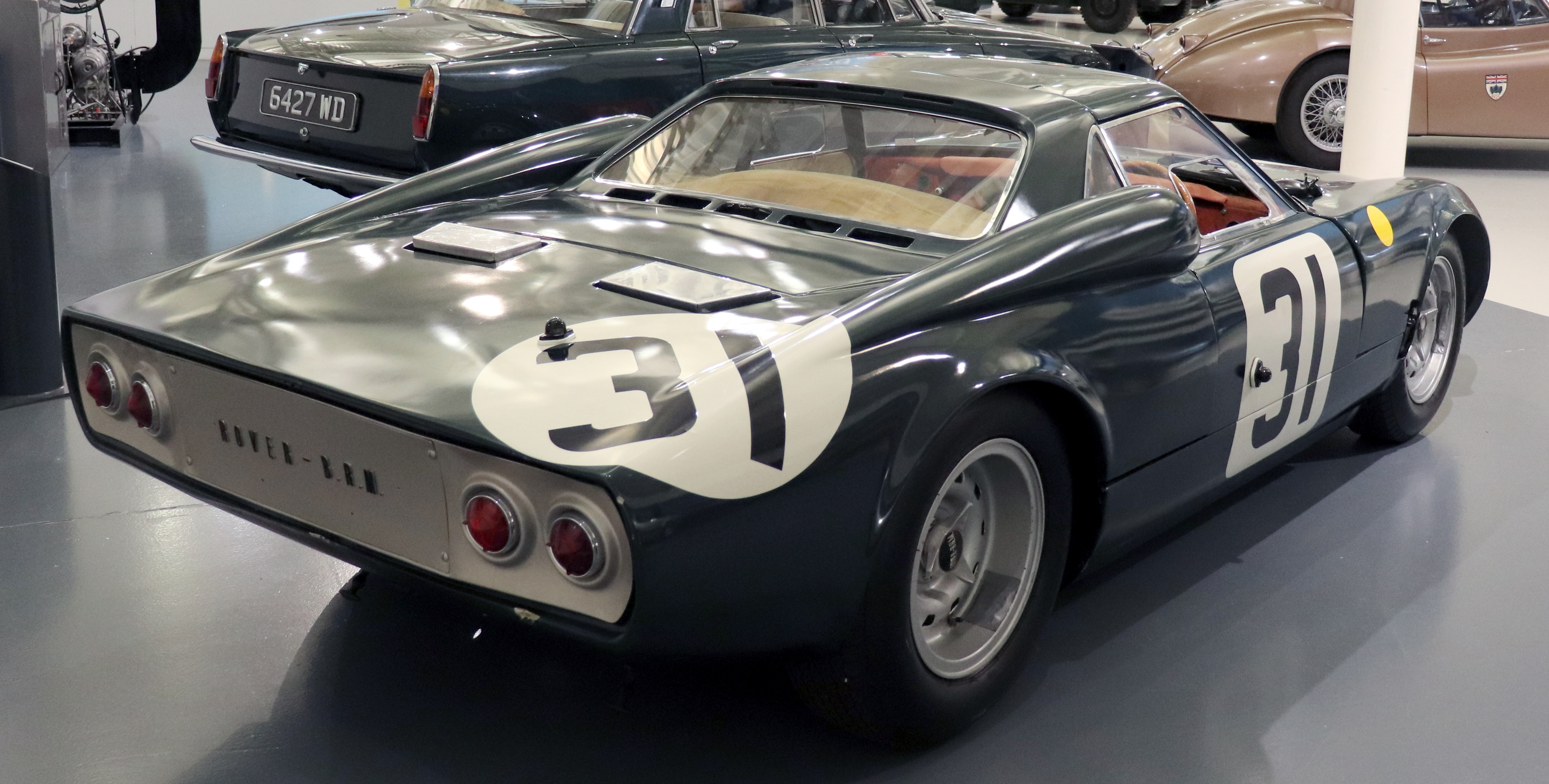
Rear view of Rover-BRM with the 1964 coupe bodywork

=== 1963 Le Mans ===
The car ran at the 1963 24 Hours of Le Mans, carrying the race number "00" as an experimental car. The turbine engine was judged to be equivalent to a 2-litre, but was permitted twice the usual fuel allowance. Le Mans has always taken an interest in fuel efficiency and some classes depend on achieving particular figures.

Graham Hill and Richie Ginther, who had past experience of the same chassis in a different guise the year before, drove in the race.

The 3,600 km figure was achieved with hours to spare, and with peak speeds down the Mulsanne Straight exceeding 140 mph. The overall averages were of 107.8 mph and 6.97 mpg. As the only car in its class it was unplaced, but the same performance by a petrol-engined car would have placed it in 8th place.

=== 1964 ===
For the 1964 season, the major change was the addition of a pair of ceramic rotary regenerators to the gas turbine, so as to improve efficiency. Although often reported as "heat exchangers", these use a different technique. Two honeycomb disks rotate slowly at 20 rpm with both inlet and exhaust airflows passing through them, but separately. This heats the disk, which then rotates, and in turn heats the inlet air. Regenerators slightly restrict the peak power of a gas turbine, but hugely increase its efficiency in compensation.

The car also gained a new body, a closed coupe designed by Rover's William Towns. To improve intake airflow, large pods were added over the rear intakes, after the test weekend, where it ran with small air scoops. There was little time to test the new engine however, and the car was also slightly damaged during transport back to Britain. For one of these reasons (history is unclear just which), the team withdrew from the 1964 24 Hours of Le Mans.

=== 1965 Le Mans ===
The 1964 engine was now used to race in anger at the 1965 24 Hours of Le Mans. Rather than running as an "experimental", it was numbered "31" and was a competitor against others in the 2-litre class. The fuel allowance was also now the same as for the piston cars, making the regenerators even more important. Graham Hill and Jackie Stewart were to drive.

Allegedly owing to sand from the side of the course being sucked in when Graham Hill ran wide early on, the turbine blades were damaged. The engine began to overheat and for the rest of the race had to be monitored carefully to ensure that the exhaust gas temperature wasn't exceeded. Some hours later, while Stewart was driving, the tip of a turbine blade broke off and damaged one of the regenerators with a massive explosion, although the engine kept on running.

The car performed well though, finishing tenth overall, second in the 2-litre prototype class, and the first British car. The average speed was slightly lower than previously at 98.8 mph but consumption had fallen in half to 13.51 mpg.

== Survival today ==
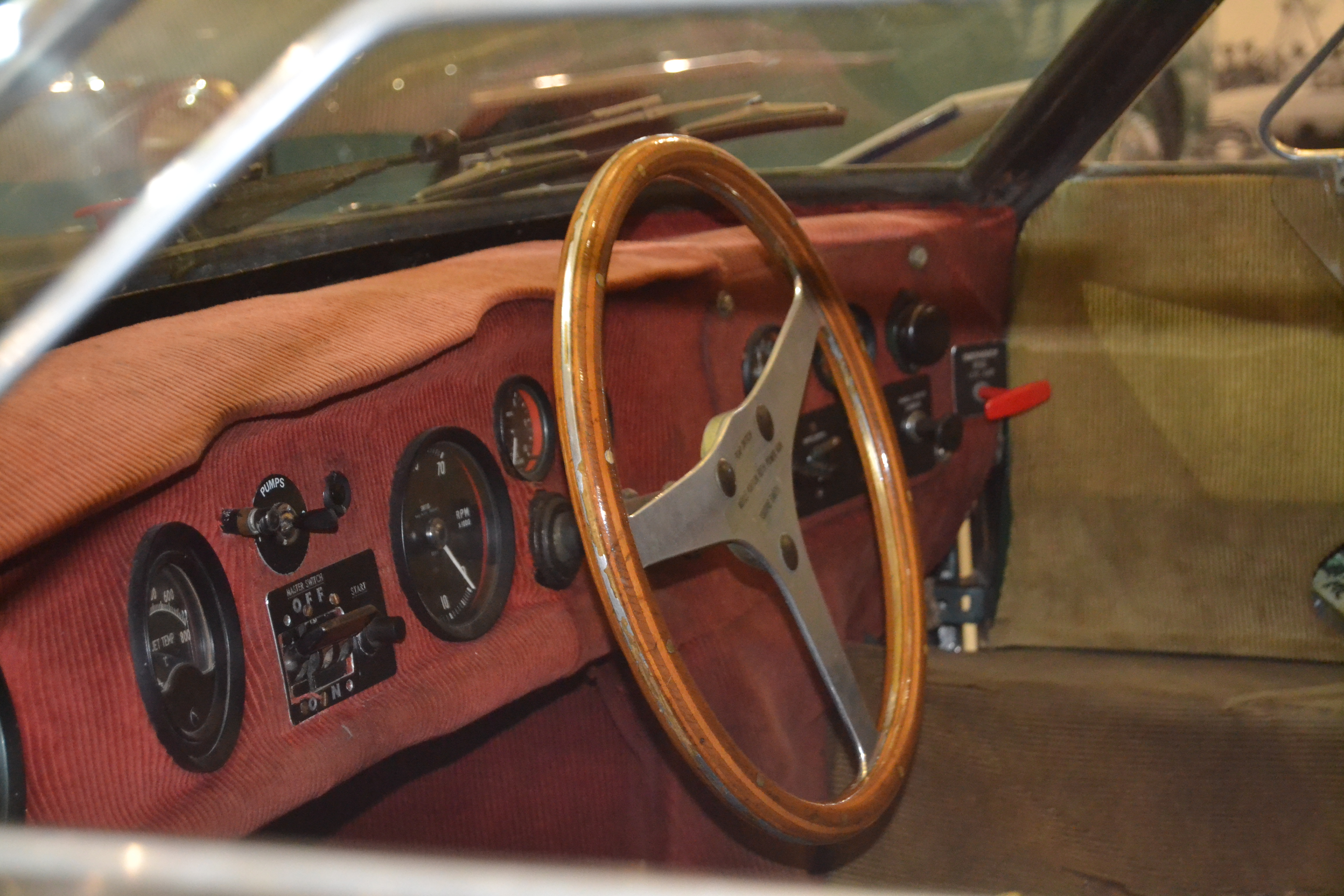
Rover-BRM interior view

After the 1965 Le Mans, the car was once briefly tested on public roads by the magazine Motor, but retired completely by 1974. In recent years the car is nominally on display at the British Motor Museum, Gaydon.

Restored by a team of volunteers, the car is regularly seen at motoring events throughout the UK.

In July 2014 the car was demonstrated at Le Mans Classic.

The car was showcased at the Coventry Motofest in 2016, running on a closed section of the Coventry Ring Road.

During 2022 the car was on display at Thirlestane Castle, the Shelsley Walsh Speed Hill Climb and the Goodwood Revival.

== See also ==
- Chrysler Turbine Car
- General Motors Firebird
