= Power brakes =

Hydraulically-intensified braking

Power brakes consist of a system of hydraulics used to slow down or stop a motor vehicle. It uses a combination of mechanical components and vacuum assistance to multiply the pressure applied to the brake pedal by the driver into enough force to actuate the brakes and stop the vehicle. By contrast, manual brakes rely solely on the pressure the driver applies to the brake pedal.

A power braking system consists of several distinct components, including the vacuum booster, master cylinder, brake fluid reservoir and lines, and calipers (or drums). Power brakes have been around in some form since the 1920s, and since the late 20th century all cars sold in North America have been equipped with power brakes.

== Components ==
=== Vacuum booster ===
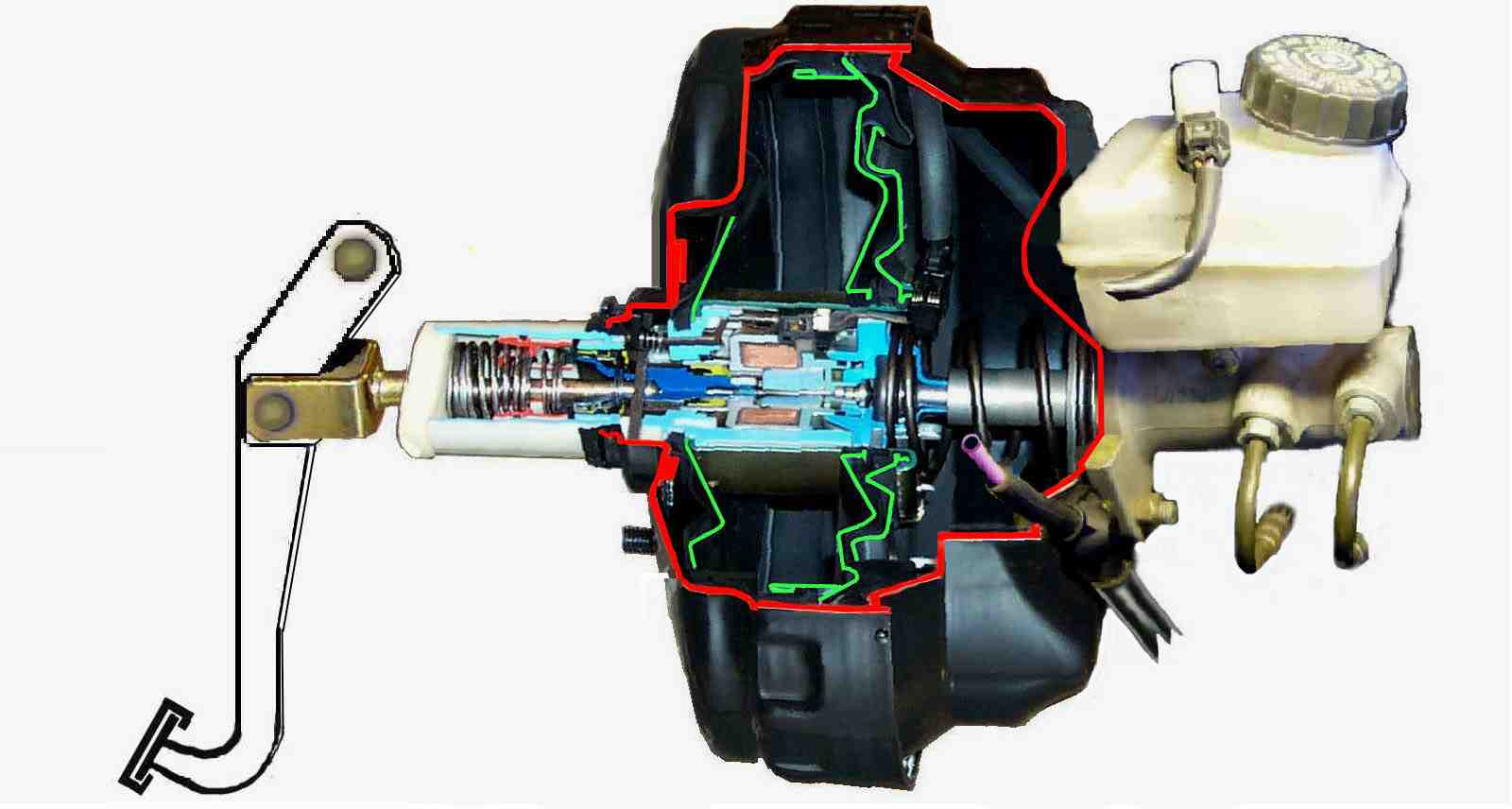
A cutaway view of the inside of the vacuum booster assembly

The vacuum booster was invented in 1927 in order to provide a shorter stopping distance. Vacuum boosters provide brake assist for the driver by multiplying the force out of the booster creating more than the force that was used to push on the brake pedal. The booster works by pulling the air out of the booster chamber with a pump or other vacuum source (typically the engine's intake manifold), creating a low-pressure system inside. When the driver steps on the brake pedal, the input rod on the booster is pushed in which lets atmospheric pressure into the booster. This, in turn, pushes the diaphragm toward the master cylinder.

=== Master cylinder ===
An animation of how the master cylinder works along with how the force is transferred to the brake calipers

The master cylinder is located behind the driver’s side dashboard mounted on the vacuum booster. The pressure inside of the master cylinder is created by a primary and secondary piston. These are pushed by the output rod of the vacuum booster to compress fluid within its primary and secondary chambers (hydraulic pressure). The hydraulic pressure is translated through the brake lines to the brake calipers. When the brake fluid is pushed through the brake lines, the master cylinder chambers are replenished by the reservoir (attached to the top of the master cylinder).

=== Brake calipers ===
Often used in disc brakes, the brake calipers consists of one to two hollow aluminum or chrome-plated steel pistons (caliper pistons). Brake calipers are one of the most important parts of a vehicle and are essential for your vehicle's ability to stop. The job of the caliper is to slow the vehicle's wheels using the friction they create against metal discs (rotors). They work by taking the pressure given by the master cylinder to force the pistons against the rotor. The development and use of disc-type brakes began in England in the 1890s. The first caliper-type automobile disc brake was patented by Frederick William Lanchester in his Birmingham factory in 1902. In a disc-braking system the rotors are attached to the car's wheels and spin together.

=== Drum brakes ===
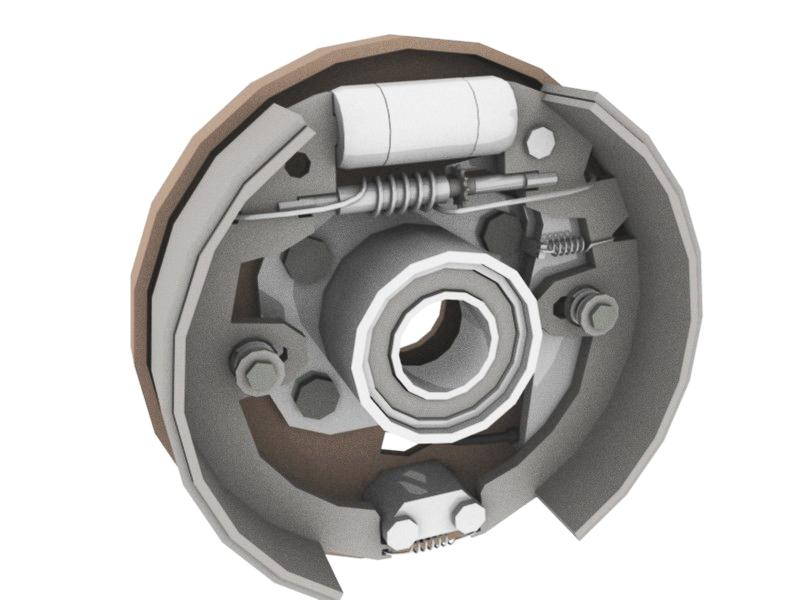
The inside of a drum brake with the drum removed to show the internal mechanisms

Another type of power brake installed in automobiles is called the drum brake. This type of brake, in general, will create some friction that will slow down the wheel. In this type of brake there is a brake cylinder that connects master cylinder to the drum brake via brake lines that transfer pressure from the master cylinder. When the driver pushes the brake pedal with his/her foot, the pistons inside the cylinder will activate. The activation of this piston will allow two brake shoes located within the drum of the brake to expand, thus generating friction to slow down and stop the wheel. Usually, this brake is located in the rear wheels of the vehicle, while the disc brake is located at the front of the vehicle. A car may also have only drum brakes or disc brakes both front and rear.

== Operation ==
The driver initiates the braking process by depressing the brake pedal, springing a series of mechanical linkages into motion. The pressure exerted by the driver on the pedal is multiplied by the vacuum booster, which uses engine vacuum to pull the booster's rod and diaphragm forward toward the master cylinder. The forward travel of the rod causes the piston in the master cylinder to compress; this action pushes the brake fluid through the brake lines, which lead to the calipers. There, the fluid compresses the caliper pistons, which causes the brake pads to move inboard and contact the rotors. The resulting friction slows the vehicle.

This process is largely the same as a manual braking system; the primary difference is the addition of the vacuum booster.
