= Stahls Automotive Collection =

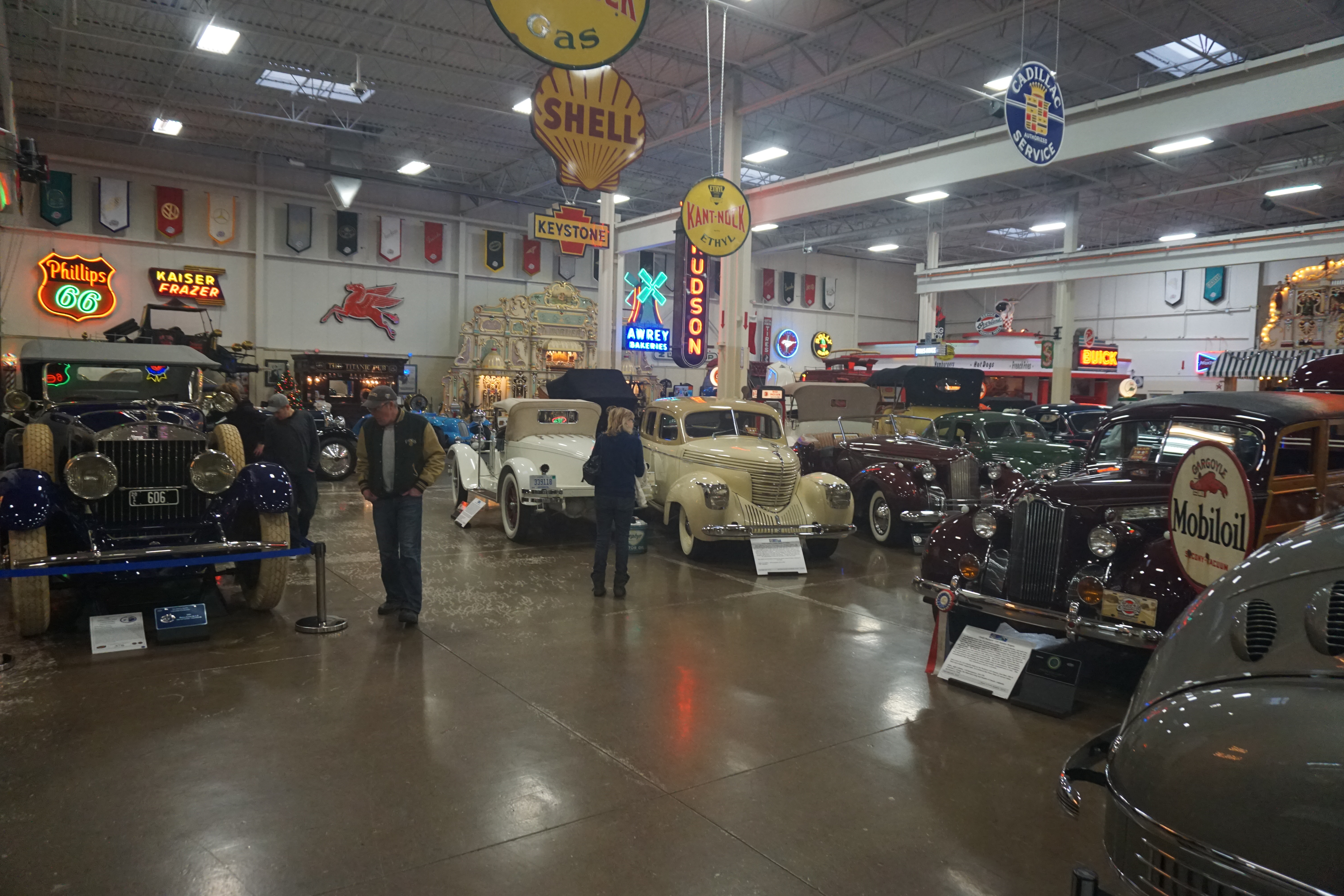
- The interior of Stahls Automotive Collection in December 2021

- Location within Michigan Location within the United States
- Location: 56516 North Bay Drive, Chesterfield Township, Michigan
- Coordinates: 42.717745°N 82.804647°W
- Type: Automobile museum
- Key holdings: Chrysler Turbine Car; 1934 Duesenberg Model J Tucker 48
- Collection size: Over 90 cars About 20 musical instruments
- Visitors: 5,000 (in 2014)
- Founders: Mary and Ted Stahl
- Owners: Mary and Ted Stahl
- Website: https://www.stahlsauto.com/

Stahls Automotive Collection is a non-profit 501(c)3 automotive collection in Chesterfield Township, Michigan, US. It is the personal collection of Detroit natives Mary and Ted Stahl, the chairman of fabric-based heat printer GroupeSTAHL in St. Clair Shores.

The collection contains over 90 cars housed in a 45,000-square-foot (4,200 m^{2}) garage, most of which are from the Art Deco era and the Great Depression. The collection focuses mostly on American cars, including former makes such as Auburn, Cord, Duesenberg, Oldsmobile, Pontiac, and Packard in addition to cars built by Cadillac, Chevrolet, Chrysler, and Ford. Stahls purchases vehicles largely based on their degree of innovative engineering and their importance to the development of automobile design.

The oldest car in the collection is an 1886 Roberts Electric, and the first one purchased is a 1930 Ford Model A Roadster Deluxe. Among the most prominent cars in the collection are a 1934 Duesenberg Model J, a Tucker 48, and a handful of cars built for films, such as Chitty Chitty Bang Bang, The Great Race, How the Grinch Stole Christmas, and The Reivers. In 2021, the collection acquired a Chrysler Turbine Car, one of only nine to survive and one of only two in a private collection (the other belonging to Jay Leno).

In addition to the cars, the collection also includes many musical instruments, including a Wurlitzer theater pipe organ originally built for the home of the son of Rudolph Wurlitzer. There is a separate "music room" featuring orchestrions and other automated musical instruments.

The collection is open to the public at no charge on Tuesday afternoons, the first Saturday of each month, and every Thursday excluding the third Thursday during the summer. Regular events at the collection include an annual Autos for Autism fundraiser, which benefits the Ted Lindsay Foundation, and a Veterans Day open house.
