= Sam B. Williams =

American inventor (1921–2009)

Sam Barlow Williams (7 May 1921 in Seattle, Washington – 22 June 2009 in Indian Wells, California) was an American inventor and founder of Williams International. He was best known for his development of the small fan-jet engine, and received several prestigious awards for innovation in this field of aviation.

Among the awards that Williams received were:

- Collier Trophy 1978, presented by President Jimmy Carter
- Wright Brothers Memorial Trophy 1988, presented by President Ronald Reagan
- National Medal of Technology 1995, presented by President Bill Clinton

The Medal of Technology was awarded to Williams for:

"His unequaled achievements as a gifted inventor, tenacious entrepreneur, risk-taker and engineering genius in making the USA number one in small gas turbine engine technology and competitiveness, and for his leadership and vision in revitalizing the U.S. general aviation business jet and trainer jet aircraft industry."

He was also an inductee into the National Inventors Hall of Fame and the National Aviation Hall of Fame 1998. In addition to efforts in aviation, he helped promote inventors and inventions in medical research for cancer and for degenerative eye disease, with which he was afflicted.

Williams was a mechanical engineer for the Chrysler Corporation before starting his own company to develop and build small gas turbine engines. The first production contract was for an experimental gas turbine for a marine outboard.

== See also ==
- Chrysler turbine engines
