= Rover JET1 =

Gas turbine car

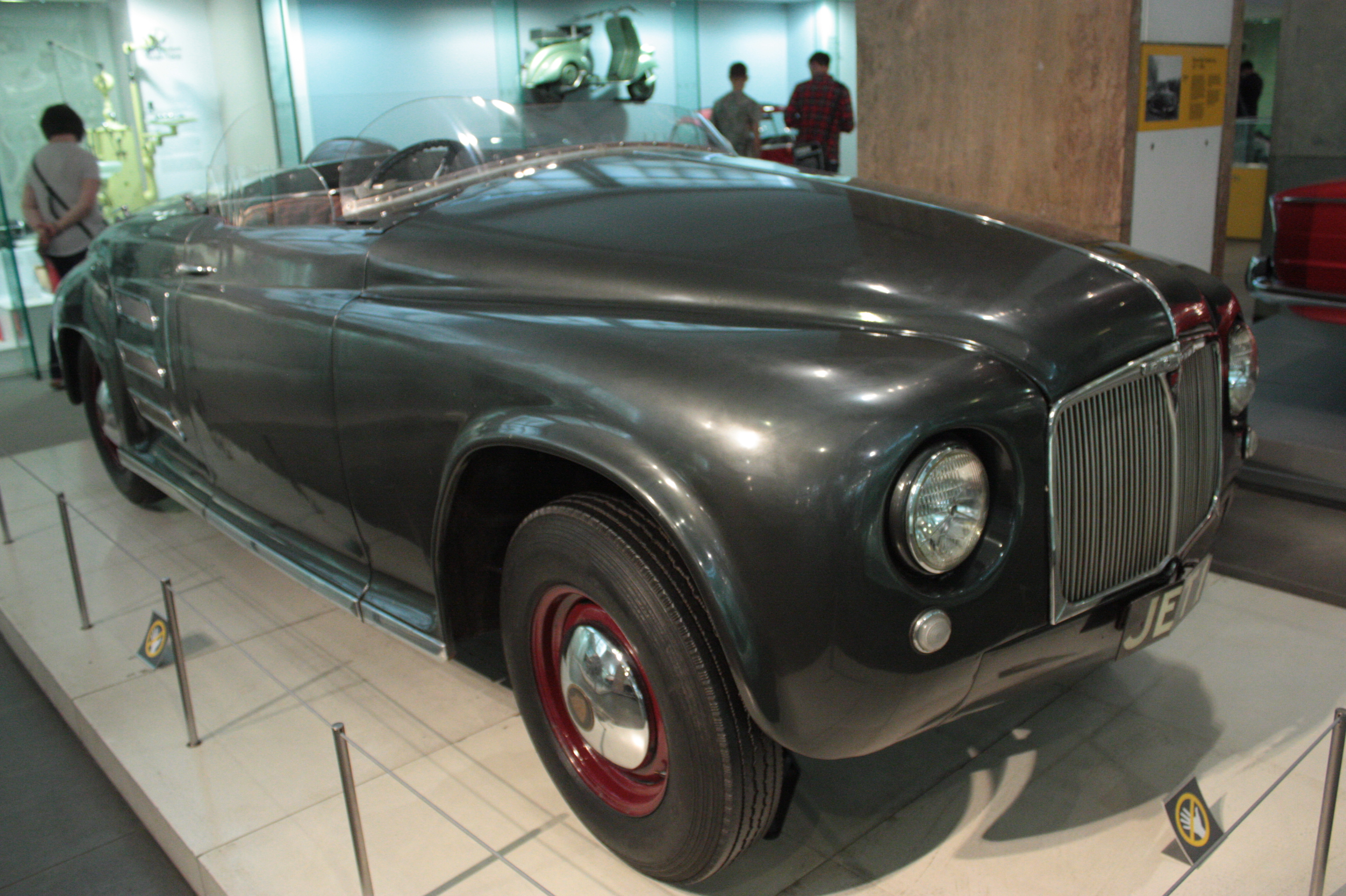
Rover Jet 1, front view

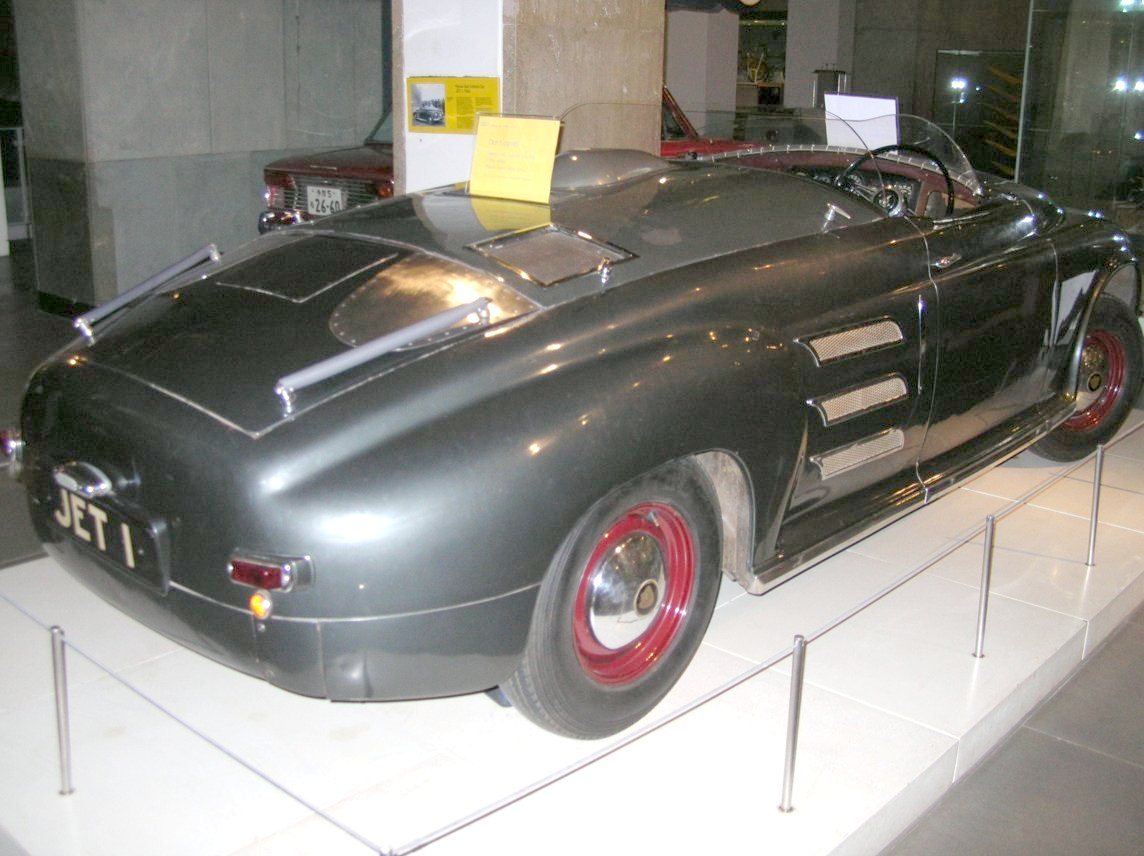
rear view

The Rover JET1 was a wheel driven gas turbine engined car originally built in Solihull in 1949/1950 by the Rover Company, and modified to a more aerodynamic style in 1952. It held a world speed record for a gas turbine-powered car in 1952 with a speed of 152.691 mph. Rover won the Dewar Trophy in 1950 for this work, in recognition of its outstanding pioneering achievement. It was the first time this trophy had been awarded since 1929.

In March 1950, Rover showed the JET1 prototype, the first car powered with a gas turbine engine, to the public. The JET1, an open two-seat tourer, had the engine positioned behind the seats, air intake grilles on either side of the car, and exhaust outlets on the top of the tail. During tests, the car reached a top speed of 88 mph (142 km/h). After being shown in the United Kingdom and the United States in 1950, the JET1 was further developed, and was subjected to speed trials on the Jabbeke highway in Belgium in June 1952, where it exceeded 150 miles per hour (240 km/h). The JET1 is currently on display at the London Science Museum.

== See also ==
- Rover-BRM
- Rover T3
