= Walter P. Chrysler Museum =

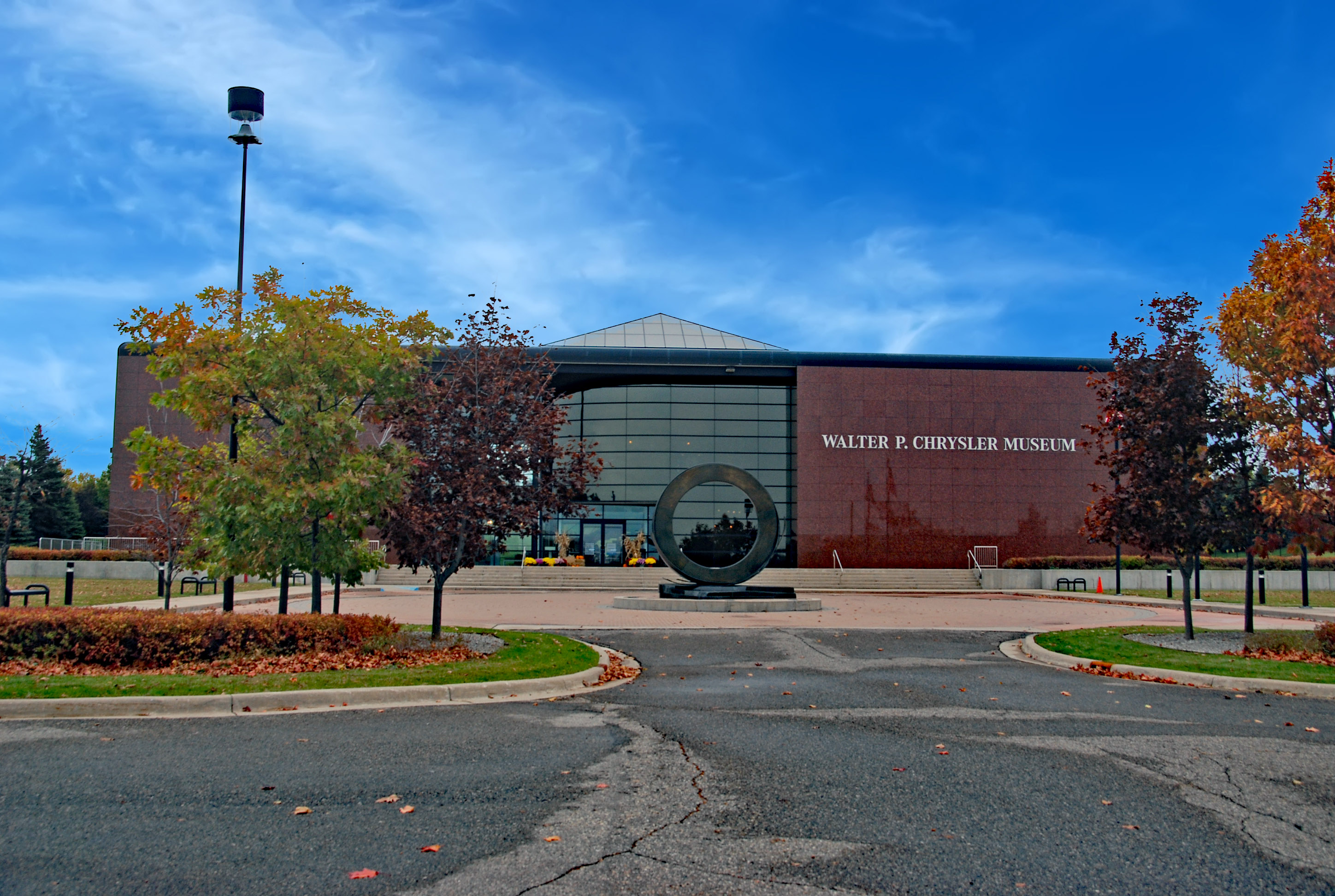

- Location within Michigan Walter P. Chrysler Museum (the United States)
- Established: 1999
- Dissolved: 2016
- Location: Auburn Hills, Michigan
- Coordinates: 42.6506°N 83.2218°W
- Type: Car museum
- Collection size: 65 vehicles
- Website: wpchryslermuseum.org

The Walter P. Chrysler Museum was a car museum in Auburn Hills, Michigan, featuring historically significant vehicles designed and manufactured by Chrysler, Dodge, Plymouth, Jeep, AMC, Nash, Hudson, and Rambler.

It was in operation from October 1999 through December 2012, with a brief re-opening in 2016 before closing permanently in December 2016. The museum was named after Walter P. Chrysler, the founder of Chrysler Corporation. Today, the former museum is the American corporate headquarters for Maserati.

== Design ==
Designed by Giffels Associates and occupying 10 acres adjacent the southeast edge of Chrysler's North American headquarters in Auburn Hills, Michigan, the museum had three levels with about 55,000 square feet of exhibition space, its polished red granite and black glass exterior correlating to the nearby Chrysler Headquarters and Technology Center. Groundbreaking took place on November 19, 1996, and the museum opened on October 5, 1999.

The building featured 65 antique, custom and concept vehicles along with interactive displays and historical exhibits depicting Chrysler's design, technology and innovation, and the cultural impact of the automobile.

A two-story atrium featured a prominent rotating tower, mounted with platforms suspending concept vehicles. The atrium gave access to two floors of exhibition galleries and a more straightforward lower level, which traced the first 50 years of the automotive industry, focusing on Walter P. Chrysler and his company. A number of rare vehicles from the early 1900s were featured. A timeline wall detailed the roles of individuals and legacy companies, including DeSoto, Hudson, Nash, Plymouth, Rambler and Willys-Overland.

The second floor featured the first Chrysler Hemi from 1951, as well as displays about vehicle styling, electronics, turbine technology, safety and fuel economy. The garage-like lower level held vehicles from the 1960s and 1970s, as well as a series of Jeep vehicles and trucks.

== Closure ==
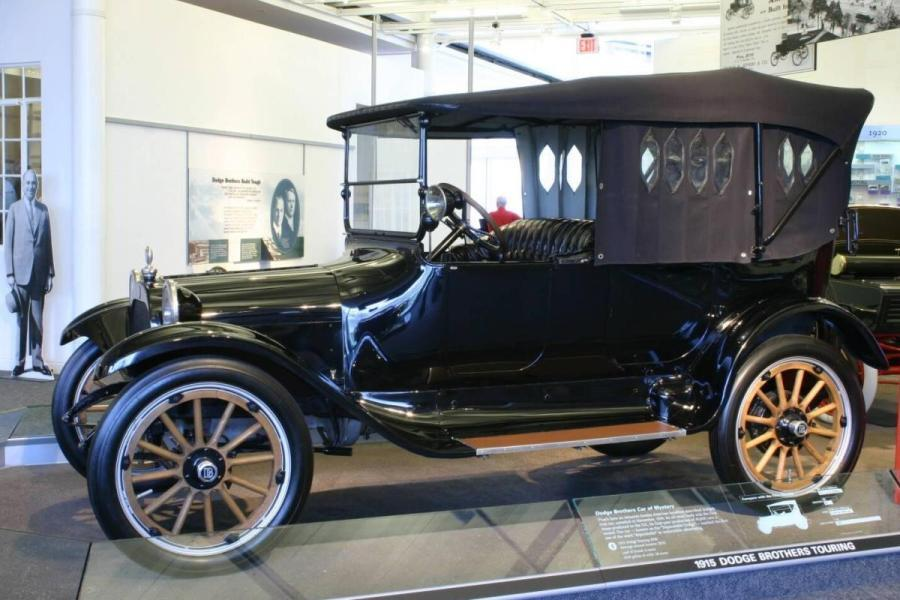
1915 Dodge Brothers Touring Car

The museum received an average of 90,000 visitors annually and was profitable initially. However, the facility lost nearly $1.5 million from 2010 to 2011, and due to low attendance, it closed to the public on December 31, 2012.

Its assets were sold to the Chrysler Foundation, a charitable arm of Chrysler Group, LLC. In 2016, the museum briefly reopened with limited hours for event and meeting rentals, as well as Chrysler special events – before closing permanently on December 18, 2016.

The building was subsequently converted to office space, with the 65 cars of the collection to be displayed for special events at the Chrysler Technology Center and other FCA facilities. Maserati's U.S. headquarters was relocated from Englewood Cliffs, New Jersey, to the former museum, and Alfa Romeo's U.S. operation shares the space with Maserati.
