= List of aircraft (Sz) =

This is a list of aircraft in alphabetical order beginning with 'Sz'.

== Sz ==
=== Szaraz ===
(Arpad "Art" Szaraz, Cleveland, OH)

- Szaraz SDS-1A Daphne

=== Szebeny-Oravecz ===
(György Szebeny - Béla Oravecz)

- Szebeny-Oravecz Iskola(regn:H-MAAC)

=== Székely ===
(Mihály Székely)

- Székely 1 1910
- Székely Canard 1911
- Székely Újság 1912
- Székely Bübü 1913
- Székely Parasol

=== Szekely ===
( (Otto E) Szekely Aircraft & Engine Co)

- Szekely Flying Dutchman

=== Sznycer ===
(Bernard W. Sznycer, Sznycer-Gottlieb, Sznycer Helicopters)

- Sznycer SG-VI-C
- Sznycer SG-VI-D Grey Gull
- Sznycer SG-VI-E Grey Gull
- Sznycer Omega BS-12
