= Tin Goose =

Tin Goose is a nickname of:

- Ford Trimotor, an American three-engined transport aircraft, first flown 1926
- Tucker 48, a 1948 automobile
