= Franklin O-350 =

American air-cooled aircraft engine

O-350/6A-350
- Type: Piston aircraft engine
- National origin: United States
- Manufacturer: Franklin Engine Company/WSK-PZL
- First run: 1964
- Developed from: Franklin O-335

The Franklin O-350 (company designation 6A-350) was an American air-cooled aircraft engine of the 1960s. The engine was of six-cylinder, horizontally-opposed layout and displaced 350 cu in (6 L). The power output was 235 hp (175 kW). The 6V-350 was a vertically mounted, fan cooled version for helicopters.

== Variants ==
6A-350
235 hp (175 kW) at 3,200 rpm

6A-350C1
220 hp (164 kW) at 2,800 rpm
6A-350C1R
205 hp (153 kW) at 2,800 rpm
6A-350C1L
205 hp (153 kW) at 2,800 rpm
6A-350C2
215 hp (160 kW) at 2,800 rpm
The C2 is the same as C1, except for the induction system piping. When a Marvel Schebler MA4-5 carburetor is used on the 6A-350-C1 engine for improved acceleration the takeoff and max. continuous rating are 215 hp (160 kW) at 2,800 rpm.

6AS-350
Turbocharged, 235 hp (175 kW) at 2,800 rpm.

6V-350
Vertically mounted, fan-cooled helicopter version, 235 hp (175 kW) at 3,200 rpm

== Applications ==
- Bushcaddy L-164
- Cessna 170
- Cessna 172
- Cessna 175
- Hirth Acrostar
- Jovair Sedan
- Kaiser Magic
- Maule M-4
- Maule M-5
- Procaer Picchio
- PZL M-20 Mewa
- Rallye Commodore
- SIAI-Marchetti S.205
- SIAI-Marchetti SH-4
- Stinson 108
- Van's RV-8
- Zenith STOL CH 801

== Specifications (6A-350) ==
Data from

=== General characteristics ===
- Type: 6-cylinder air-cooled horizontally opposed aircraft piston engine
- Bore: 4.625 in (117.5 mm)
- Stroke: 3.5 in (88.9 mm)
- Displacement: 352.8 in³ (5.78 L)
- Dry weight: 307 lb (139 kg)

=== Components ===
- Cooling system: Air-cooled

=== Performance ===
- Power output: 235 hp (175 kW) at 3,200 rpm

== See also ==
Comparable engines

- Continental IO-360

Related lists

- List of aircraft engines
