= Aero-Flight Streak =

Aero-Flight aircraft

Streak
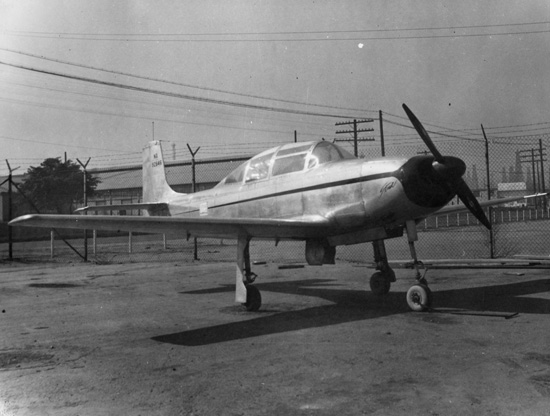
- AFA-2

General information
- Type: Light aircraft
- National origin: United States
- Manufacturer: Aero-Flight
- Number built: 1

History
- First flight: 1946

The Aero-Flight Streak was an American two-seat light aircraft built in 1946 by Aero-Flight Aircraft Corporation at Buffalo, New York. Advanced for its time, it was of all-metal construction with tricycle undercarriage, and accommodated the pilot and passenger in tandem beneath a sliding, bubble canopy.

Initially flown powered by a Continental C85, successively more powerful engines were fitted in an attempt to arouse interest in the marketplace. Due to the saturation of the light aircraft market in the years immediately following World War II, no production ensued and the project was dead by 1953.

== Variants ==
AFA-1 Streak-85
Powered by 85 hp (63 kW) Continental C85-12J.
AFA-2 Streak-125
Powered by 125 hp (93 kW) Continental C125.
AFA-3 Streak-165
Powered by Franklin 6A4
AFA-4 Streak-225
Powered by a 225 hp Continental engine

== Specifications (AFA-3) ==
Data from Jane's All The World's Aircraft 1951–52.

General characteristics

- Crew: 2
- Length: 22 ft 4 in (6.81 m)
- Wingspan: 25 ft 3 in (7.70 m)
- Height: 8 ft 3 in (2.51 m)
- Empty weight: 1,045 lb (474 kg)
- Gross weight: 1,695 lb (769 kg)
- Fuel capacity: 40 US gal (150 L; 33 imp gal)
- Powerplant: 1 × Franklin 6A4 six-cylinder air-cooled horizontally opposed piston engine, 165 hp (123 kW)

Performance

- Maximum speed: 190 kn (219 mph, 352 km/h)
- Cruise speed: 180 kn (210 mph, 340 km/h)
- Stall speed: 50 kn (57 mph, 92 km/h)
- Range: 920 nmi (1,060 mi, 1,710 km)
- Service ceiling: 25,500 ft (7,800 m)
- Rate of climb: 2,000 ft/min (10 m/s)

== Bibliography ==
- Bridgman, Leonard (1948). Jane's All The World's Aircraft 1948. London: Sampson Low, Marston & Co. Ltd.
- Bridgman, Leonard (1951). Jane's All The World's Aircraft 1951–52. London: Sampson Low, Marston & Co. Ltd.
- Taylor, J. H. (ed) (1989) Jane's Encyclopedia of Aviation. Studio Editions: London. p. 28
- Aerofiles
