= Read Viemeister =

American industrial designer

Read Viemeister (1922 – 10 September 1993) was an American industrial designer. He was the Creative Director for the Lippincott team working on the Tucker car in 1947, and the founder of Vie Design Studios in Yellow Springs, Ohio.

== Early life and education ==
Born in Baltimore in 1922 Read Viemeister was the son of architect August L. Viemeister and artist Janet Emmons Viemeister. The family later moved to a house his father designed in Roslyn Heights, NY. During the Depression they traveled to Taos, New Mexico, as well as the 1939 World's Fair. Later, Viemeister was exempted from military service because of a Polio disability.

He went on to study at Pratt Institute with many of the founders of the American industrial design education: Donald Dohner, Alexander Kostellow and Rowena Reed Kostellow. Viemeister graduated from Pratt in 1943.

== Career ==
Viemeister began his career as Director of Styling of Dohner and Lippincott (now called Lippincott). Preston Tucker asked Lippincott to help design his new car, and Viemeister joined the project. As Creative Director for the Lippincott Viemeister led team working on the Tucker car in 1947 He also founded the Department of Industrial Design at the Dayton Art Institute in 1949.

== Vie Design Studios ==
In 1946 he married Beverly Lipsett, moved to Yellow Springs, Ohio and founded Vie Design Studios with Budd Steinhilber. They designed award-winning graphics, products, furniture, exhibits and buildings. Their DAP, Antioch College logos and GraLab darkroom timer are still being produced. They designed many more logos including those for Dayton Art Institute, Huffy, American Standard, and NCR. He was most proud of the First Flight mural he created for the Aviation Hall of Fame. The famous picture of the Wright brothers flight transformed into a digital mosaic ceramic tiles using 20 gray-tone values represented with symbols.

== Awards ==
Active in the design field, he was Fellow of the Industrial Design Society of America and Pratt Alumni Achievement Award (1993).

== Death ==
Viemeister died in 1993 of lung cancer at home, in his bed he had designed forty years earlier.

== Personal life ==
Viemeister had 4 children: Tucker, Kris, Heidi and Roslyn Viemeister.
