= Omega BS-12 =

General information
- Type: Helicopter
- National origin: United States of America
- Manufacturer: Omega Aircraft Corp, Allied Aero Industries, ADRC
- Designer: Bernard W Sznycer
- Number built: at least 4

History
- Introduction date: 1958
- First flight: December 29, 1956
- Developed from: Sznycer SG-VI-E (a.k.a. Sznycer-Gottlieb SG-VI)

The Omega BS-12 was a utility helicopter with high ground clearance designed to carry loads behind the cabin at, or near, the center of gravity. It was one of the early twin engine designs to be developed, and had a unique pod-and-boom style design similar to the later Sikorsky S-60

The manufacturer went bankrupt before it entered full production, even though the prototypes were successfully completed with some order after being certified.

The design is noted for pioneering twin-engine utility helicopter design for a variety of commercial uses.

== Design & development ==
Bernard Sznycer, designer of the Sznycer SG-VI, the first helicopter certified in Canada, set up the Omega Aircraft Corporation, based at New Bedford, Massachusetts in December 1953, with himself as President and Chief Designer of the company. Omega's first design was a twin-engined flying crane / utility helicopter, intended to be inexpensive to produce and relatively cheap to operate.

The helicopter was of conventional layout, with a single four-bladed lift rotor and a two bladed anti-torque rotor. Its fuselage was of pod-and-boom layout, with a small enclosed crew cabin forward connected to an uncovered steel tube tail boom. Cargo, either a slung load or in a pre-loaded pod, could be carried between the crew cabin and the undercarriage mainwheels, while it was planned to also provide a pod to carry passengers. It was powered by twin piston engines mounted horizontally on either side of the main gearbox.

== Operational history ==
The first example made its maiden flight on December 29, 1956. The type was certified by the Federal Aviation Administration in April 1961. Omega planned to build an initial batch of 25 BS-12-D-1s, which were priced at $77,500, with production gradually building up from one per month. Although Omega received orders for several BS-12s following certification, shortages of funds stopped production, and Omega entered into bankruptcy in July 1962. Omega was purchased by the Aeronautical Research and Development Corporation of Boston, Massachusetts, with the intention of putting the BS-12 into production as the ADRC/Omega RD-400.

== Variants ==
BS-12
Initial prototype powered by 2x 210 hp (156.60 kW) Franklin 6AS-335 engines, one built (c/n 156).
BS-12B
Revised BS-12, one built (c/n 1001).
BS-12D-1
Five-seat passenger cabin, powered by 2x 260 hp (193.88 kW) Lycoming O-540-F1B5 engines, two built (c/n 1002 & 1003).
BS-12D-3
The second BS-12D-1 powered by 2x supercharged Franklin 6AS-335 engines.
BS-12F
Projected turboshaft powered version, 2x Allison T63 or Boeing 502-W turbines.
BS-12J
Projected improved hot-high and single-engined performance, powered by 2x 290 hp (216.25 kW) Lycoming IO-540 engines.
BS-14 Falcon
Projected emergency services version, with longer cabin, powered by 2x 260 hp (193.88 kW) Lycoming O-540 or 290 hp (216.25 kW) Lycoming IO-540 engines.
BS-17A Airliner
Projected enlarged passenger cabin version to have been powered by 3x Allison or Boeing turboshaft engines driving a 5-bladed main rotor.
ARDC/Omega RP-400
Planned production version for ARDC. Powered by two 290 hp (220 kW) Lycoming IO-540s.
ARDC/Omega TP-900
Proposed advanced derivate of RP-400, powered by three turboshaft engines.

== Specifications (BS-12D1) ==
Data from Jane's All the World's Aircraft 1961–62

General characteristics

- Crew: 1
- Capacity: four passengers
- Length: 36 ft 0 in (10.97 m)
- Height: 13 ft 0 in (3.96 m)
- Empty weight: 3,450 lb (1,565 kg)
- Gross weight: 4,880 lb (2,214 kg)
- Powerplant: 2 × Lycoming O-540-F1B5 air-cooled six-cylinder horizontally-opposed, 235 hp (175 kW) each
- Main rotor diameter: 39 ft 0 in (11.89 m)
- Main rotor area: 1,194.6 sq ft (110.98 m^{2})

Performance

- Maximum speed: 95 mph (153 km/h, 83 kn) at sea level
- Cruise speed: 85 mph (137 km/h, 74 kn) (at 75% power)
- Service ceiling: 9,500 ft (2,900 m)
- Rate of climb: 1,200 ft/min (6.1 m/s)

== See also ==
Aircraft of comparable role, configuration, and era

- Sikorsky S-64 Skycrane
