= Aero-Flight =

The Aero-Flight Aircraft Corporation was founded by ex-Curtiss-Wright employee James Nagamatsu at Buffalo, New York, U.S. in 1946 to produce a two-seat light aircraft, the Streak. However, due to the post-war saturation of the light aircraft market, the company was unable to generate any interest in the product and ceased business in 1953.
