= Hirth Acrostar =

Aerobatic aircraft

Acrostar
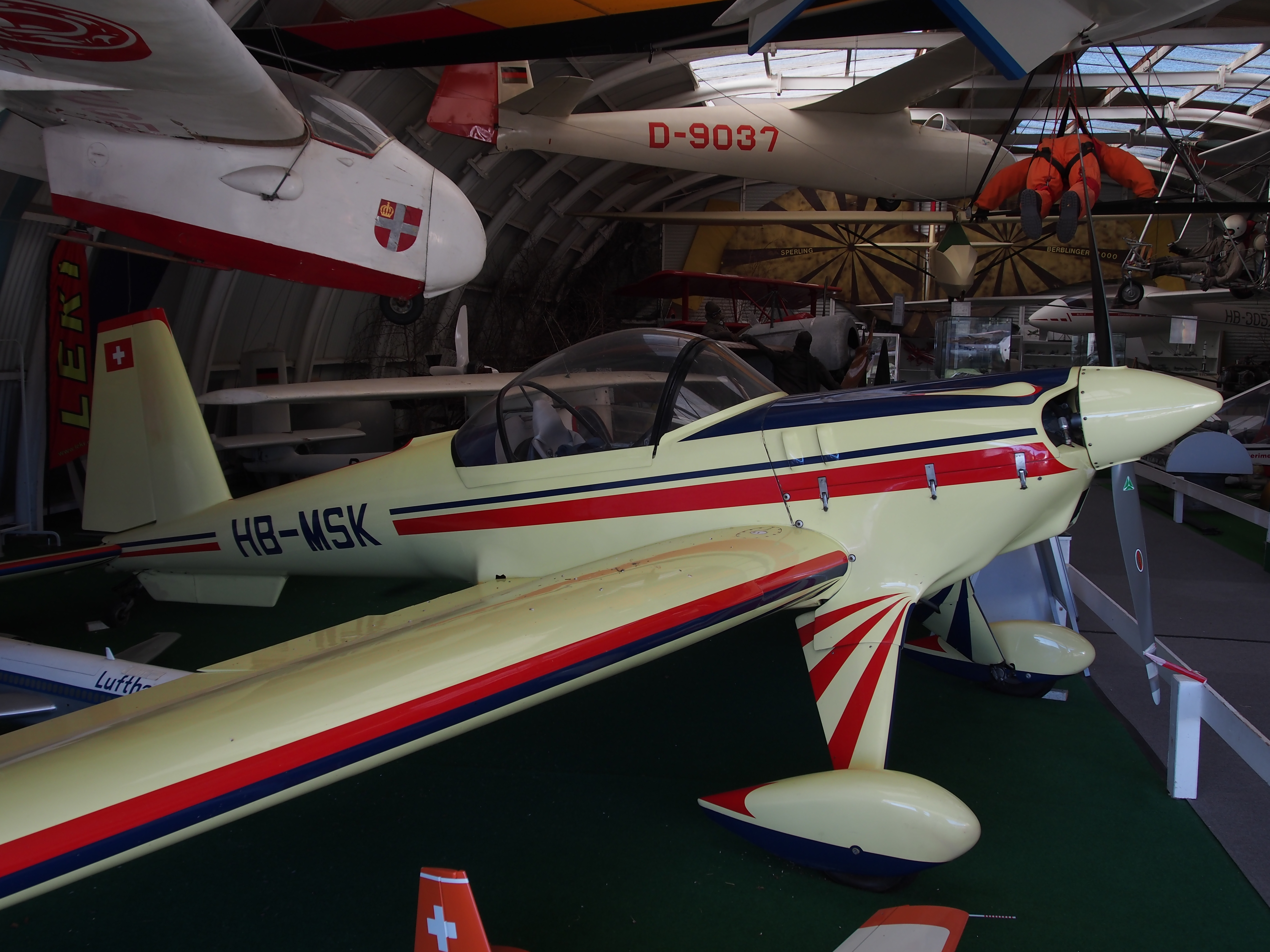

General information
- Type: Aerobatic aircraft
- National origin: West Germany
- Manufacturer: Wolf Hirth GmbH
- Designer: Arnold Wagner
- Number built: 10

History
- First flight: 16 April 1970

The Hirth Hi 27 Acrostar was designed by Arnold Wagner to win aerobatic competitions, in part by having handling independent of orientation, upright or inverted. A single engine, single seat low-wing monoplane, it was built in West Germany by Wolf Hirth GmbH in the early 1970s, and dominated Championships for a brief period.

== Design and development ==
The Hirth Hi 27 Acrostar is a competition aerobatic aircraft designed by the Swiss aerobatic champion, Arnold Wagner. Wagner and three others, two of them German ex-champions, sponsored the construction. The Wolf Hirth team was led by Prof. Richard Eppler of the Stuttgart Technische Hochschule, starting work in the Summer of 1969. The first flight of what was known as the Acrostar Mk II was on 16 April 1970.

The Acrostar is a conventionally arranged low wing single engine aircraft. The wing is straight tapered, the leading edge slightly swept and the trailing edge unswept. The aerofoil section, designed by Eppler, is quite thick with a thickness-to-chord ratio of 20%. It is a symmetric section and mounted at zero incidence. There is also zero dihedral. Full span control surfaces are fitted, flaps inboard and proportionally moving ailerons outboard. The ailerons are balanced not by the usual horn or hinge line extensions but by small surfaces which project beyond the wingtips. Unusually, both ailerons and flaps are coupled to the elevator position; this camber changing control system, together with the highly symmetric wing, produces the same control characteristics for normal and inverted manoeuvres. The basic idea in this arrangement was to keep the centerline of the fuselage horizontal in both normal and inverted horizontal flight. The result, beside this, is good controllability in low speed ballistic flight, around zero G.

Another unusual control feature, allowing for independent trimming in pitch and yaw, are the independent trim tabs on the flaps.

The plywood covered wing is built around a single glass fibre spar using foam reinforced ribs. Aft of the engine, the fuselage is a wooden semi-monocoque. The single seat cockpit is enclosed with a rearward sliding canopy. The fin and balanced rudder are straight tapered and square tipped, as is the rearward set horizontal tail. The prototype had elevator trim tabs but these were removed in favour of the flap trims noted above. Extra fin area is provided by a long strake on the lower fuselage, extending aft to the tailwheel.

The Acrostar is powered by a 220 hp (165 kW) Franklin 6A-350-C1 six cylinder horizontally opposed piston engine. This is mounted in a steel frame which is integral with the fixed cantilever main undercarriage and its optionally streamlined, tapering legs and faired wheels. This arrangement places the main landing gear further forward than usual, providing a drag moment to oppose that of the fin in vertical flight. The tailwheel is steerable.

== Operational history ==
The first prototype D-EMKB appeared in competition, three months after its first flight, at the 1970 6th World Aerobatics Competition at Hullavington, England where it was placed 4th on the individual men's list. Nonetheless, it made a strong impression and attracted orders from Germany, Switzerland and Spain for participation in the 1971 European and 1972 World Championships. Acrostars gained 1st and 3rd places at the former, the Trophée Biancotto held at Carcassonne, France. By January 1972 four had been built and another five were due for delivery ahead of the 7th World Championship, held in Salon-de-Provence, France in July 1972. Four participated with Swiss pilots coming 4th and 8th, bringing their team in 3rd place behind the US and USSR. During 1973 Acrostars won first place in the Coupe Champion Amberieu in France, the Scandinavian Cup, the Swiss International Championships, the West German Championships and the Zadar Cup in Yugoslavia.

In all 9 Acrostar Mk IIs were built. The sole Mk III weighs less and has performance and handling improvements. These include lightened control surfaces and refined wing root fairings. It also has engine cooling and lubrication changes to allow glider towing without overheating (Mk III remained a project). The Acrostar prototype D-EMKB remained active until at least June 2009. The third Acrostar, F-AZJF, previously HB-MSA was undergoing restoration in early 2010 and EC-CBS has been on display in the Museo de Aeronautica Y Astronautica, Cuatro Vientos, Madrid. Serial number 4009, originally D-EOIG, now HB-MSK, is since 1980 in private ownership, based at Donaueschingen, Germany.

== Specifications (Mk III) ==
Data from Jane's All the World's Aircraft 1975-6

General characteristics

- Crew: 1
- Length: 6.11 m (20 ft 1 in)
- Wingspan: 8 m (26 ft 3 in)
- Height: 2.5 m (8 ft 2 in)
- Wing area: 10.6 m^{2} (114 sq ft)
- Aspect ratio: 6.03
- Airfoil: Eppler 20% symmetrical
- Empty weight: 485 kg (1,069 lb)
- Max takeoff weight: 700 kg (1,543 lb)
- Fuel capacity: 50 L (13 US gal; 11 imp gal) + optional 40–60 L (11–16 US gal; 8.8–13.2 imp gal) cruise tank
- Powerplant: 1 × Franklin 6A-350-C1 6-cylinder horizontally opposed piston engine, 160 kW (220 hp)
- Propellers: 2-bladed Hartzell constant speed propeller

Performance

- Maximum speed: 305 km/h (190 mph, 165 kn) at sea level
- Maximum Manoeuvring speed 273 km/h (170 mph; 147 kn)
- Cruise speed: 252 km/h (157 mph, 136 kn) at 3,050 m (10,010 ft)
- Stall speed: 96 km/h (60 mph, 52 kn) upright
- Stalling speed inverted 94 km/h (58 mph; 51 kn)
- Never exceed speed: 420 km/h (260 mph, 230 kn)
- Ferry range: 864 km (537 mi, 467 nmi)
- Service ceiling: 7,500 m (24,600 ft) service
- Rate of climb: 15 m/s (3,000 ft/min) at sea level & 630 kg (1,390 lb)
