= Sznycer SG-VI =

SG-VI

General information
- Type: Helicopter
- National origin: Canada
- Manufacturer: Engineering Products of Canada Ltd. (SG-VI-C), Intercity Airlines (SG-VI-D)
- Designer: Bernard W Sznycer
- Number built: 2

History
- First flight: 9 July 1947 (SG-VI-C), 2 July 1948 (SG-VI-D)
- Developed into: Omega BS-12

The 'Sznycer SG-VI' (a.k.a. Sznycer-Gottlieb SG-VI) was a single-engined three-seat utility helicopter designed and built in the United States and Canada in the late 1940s to the design of Bernard Sznycer, assisted by Selma Gottlieb and Engineering Products of Canada Ltd. (CanAmerican)

== Design & development ==
Initial design work on the SG-VI began at Philadelphia in 1943 by a team led by Bernard Sznycer, including Selma Gottlieb, Harold Pitcairn and Agnew Larsen. Pitcairn and Larsen left the partnership by August 1945 when Sznycer and Intercity Airlines of Montreal, Quebec, Canada, signed a contract for the detailed design, testing and certification of a prototype helicopter to be marketed and built by the Canadian helicopter Company.

The contract did not develop as planned and the first prototype, the SG-VI-C, was built by Engineering Products of Canada Ltd., (a BF. Goodrich subsidiary at Montreal). Construction of the first prototype commenced, but with inadequate management of resources and poor supervision of workers resulting in a lack of confidence in the safety of the aircraft. A second prototype, (SG-VI-D), was built with the sanction of Intercity Airlines and satisfactory supervision.

The SG-VI-D had a crude enclosed cabin and open tubular tailboom and was powered by an 178 hp (132.73 kW) Franklin 6GA4-165-BGF engine positioned horizontally above the tailboom driving a four-bladed main rotor with a complex control system. Given the registration CF-FGG-X and named Grey Gull, the SG-VI-D gained its type certificate in February 1951, becoming the first Canadian and British Commonwealth helicopter to do so.

After certification the SG-VI-D was re-engined with a 200 hp (149.14 kW) Franklin 6A4-200-C6 engine and offered to investors for development and production as the SG-VI-E. Sznycer eventually sold the helicopter and production rights to an investor from Brooklyn who failed to capitalise on his investment, ending the development of the SG-VI.

Presently the sole remaining prototype is preserved at the Reynolds Alberta Museum, Wetaskiwin, Alberta, Canada.

== Variants ==
SG-VI-C
Initial prototype powered by a 178 hp (132.73 kW) Franklin 6GA4-165-BGF engine. Apparently little flown due to lack of confidence in the structural integrity of the airframe.
SG-VI-D
Second prototype used for flight testing and type certification.
SG-VI-E
the second prototype re-engined with a 200 hp (149.14 kW) Franklin 6A4-200-C6.

== Specifications (SG-VI-E) ==
Data from http://www.flightglobal.com/pdfarchive/view/1954/1954%20-%200674.html

General characteristics

- Crew: one
- Capacity: two passengers
- Empty weight: 1,750 lb (794 kg)
- Gross weight: 2,380 lb (1,080 kg)
- Powerplant: 1 × Franklin 6A4-200-C6 6-cyl. air-cooled horizontally opposed piston engine, 200 hp (150 kW)
- Main rotor diameter: 35 ft (11 m)

Performance

- Maximum speed: 88 mph (142 km/h, 76 kn)
- Cruise speed: 78 mph (126 km/h, 68 kn)
- Rate of climb: 760 ft/min (3.9 m/s) at sea level
