= Székely Újság =

There were two identical newspaper under title Székely Újság printed in Târgu Secuiesc (Kézdivásárhely) and circulated in Transylvania, today part of Romania. One was issued from 1904 to 1944, the other between 1989 and 1991.

== Between 1904 and 1944 ==
It was printed and published in Kézdivásárhely, then part of the Kingdom of Hungary. It was established and edited at the beginning by Emil Molnár. It was the official magazine of Economical Society of Kézdivásárhely and Its Region (Hungarian: Kézdivásárhely és Vidéke Gazdasági Egyesülete) edited by Ödön Dienes, later István Kovács J. Kovács became the publisher of the magazine. From 29 March 1925 it was published in the same issue as Székely Hírlap, though both titles were displayed. It had a Romanian subtitle as well (Gazeta Săcuimii, later Gazeta Săcuiască) from 1936 till 1944. It was last published on 30 July 1944.

== Between 1989 and 1991 ==
It was issued in Târgu Secuiesc between 23 December 1989 and 11 March 1991. At the foundation it was edited by Jr. László Deme, Vince Fekete, Attila Sántha. It had two managerial editors, Ágnes Ambrus, and later István Jochom. Tamás Nagy, László Incze and Judit Szabó. László Balogh, Gyula Kádár, Erzsébet Vikol and Géza Takács also worked for the newspaper.

There were some literature related writings together with the social issues. There were numerous writers writing novels and poems for the newspaper. For example, Attila Sántha, Vince Fekete, Sándor Kányádi, Béla Markó, Géza Páskándi or Gerzson Veres publicized here as well.

Publishing was cancelled due to the high prices of the paper. It was replaced by Székely Hírmondó in 1996.
