= Tucker 48 =

Late 1940s American car

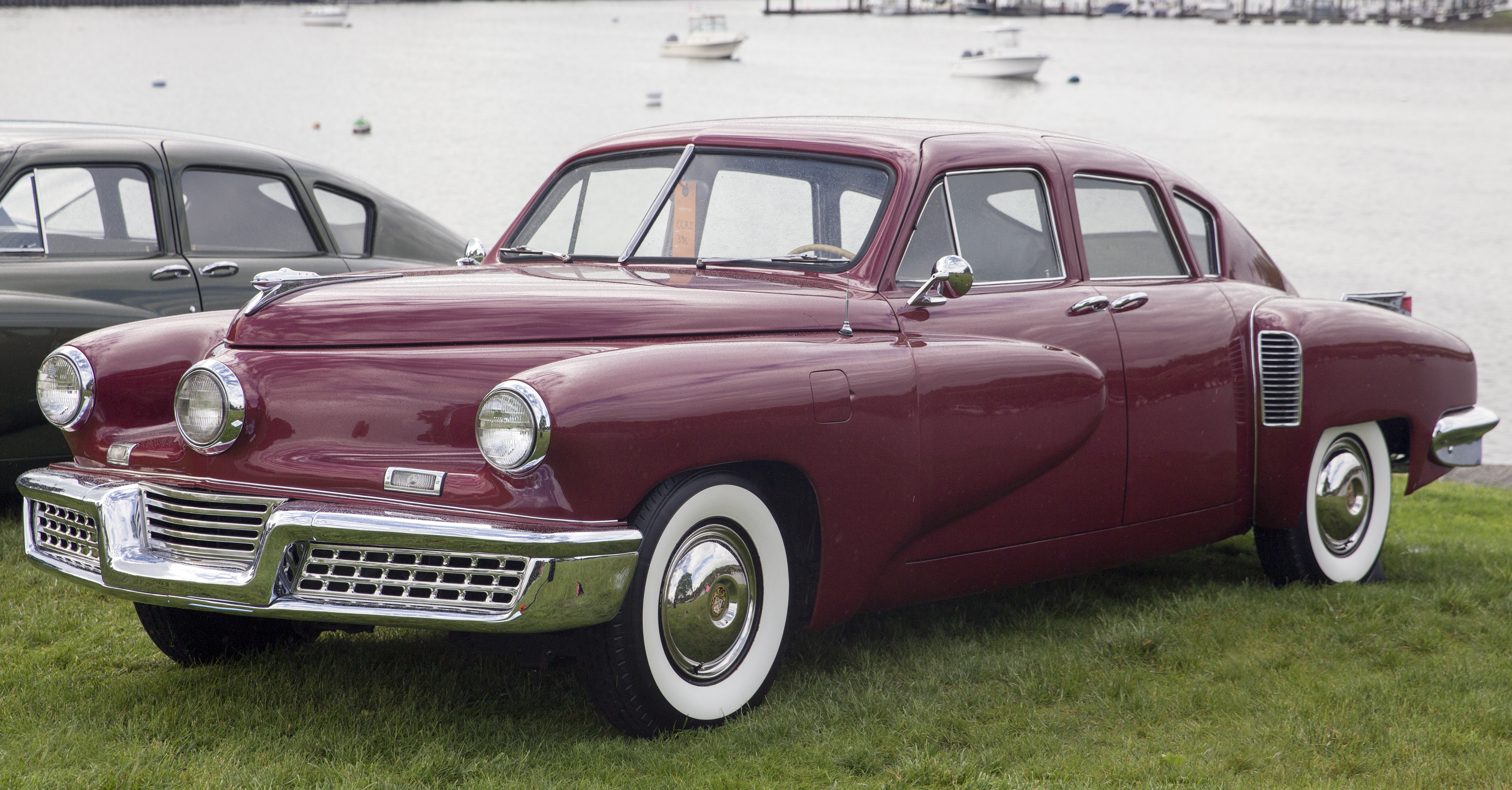
- 1948 Tucker 48 sedan (chassis #1051) at 2025 Greenwich Concours d’Elegance

Overview
- Manufacturer: Tucker Corporation
- Production: 1947–1948 total of 50 cars completed
- Model years: 1948
- Assembly: United States: Chicago, Illinois
- Designer: George S. Lawson, Alex Tremulis, Read Viemeister, Budd Steinhilber, Tucker Madawick, Hal Bergstrom, Philip S. Egan

Body and chassis
- Class: Sedan
- Layout: Rear engine, rear-wheel drive, 4-wheel independent suspension (rubber torsion tube (no springs) with shock absorbers)

Powertrain
- Engine: boxer-6 (horizontally opposed), OHV, 334.1 cubic inches (5.475 L) (4.50" bore × 3.50" stroke), 7.0:1 compression ratio, 166 bhp, 372 lb⋅ft (504 N⋅m) torque
- Transmission: Cord 810/812; Tucker Y-1 (Modified Cord 810/812); TuckerMatic (R-1, R-1-2, R-3 versions)

Dimensions
- Wheelbase: 128.0 in (3,251 mm)
- Length: 219.0 in (5,563 mm)
- Width: 79.0 in (2,007 mm)
- Height: 60.0 in (1,524 mm)
- Curb weight: 4,200 lb (1,900 kg)

The Tucker 48, originally named and still commonly referred to as the Tucker Torpedo, was an automobile conceived by Preston Tucker while in Ypsilanti, Michigan, and briefly produced in Chicago, Illinois, in 1948. Only 51 cars were made including their prototype before the company was forced to cease all operations on March 3, 1949, due to negative publicity initiated by the news media, a Securities and Exchange Commission investigation, and a heavily publicized stock fraud trial (in which the allegations were proven baseless and led to a full acquittal). Tucker suspected that the Big Three automakers and Michigan Senator Homer S. Ferguson had a role in the Tucker Corporation's demise.

The 48's original proposed price was said to be $1,000, but the actual selling price was closer to $4,000.

The 1988 movie Tucker: The Man and His Dream is based on the saga surrounding the car's production. The film's director, Francis Ford Coppola, was a Tucker owner and displayed his vehicle on the grounds of his winery.

The Tucker 48 is often referred to as the Tucker Torpedo. However, the Torpedo was actually a prototype, and the name was never used for the production model, which was officially called the "Tucker 48".

== Development ==
After World War II, the public was ready for new car designs, but the Big Three Detroit automakers had not developed any new models since 1941 because their resources had been diverted towards producing war materiel. This provided opportunities for new, small automakers which could develop new cars faster than the huge legacy automakers. Studebaker was the first to introduce an all-new postwar model series in the ponton style which had just gone mainstream, but Tucker took a different track, designing a safe car with innovative features and modern styling. His specifications called for a water-cooled aluminum block flat-6 rear engine, disc brakes, four-wheel independent suspension, fuel injection, the location of all instruments within reach of the steering wheel, seat belts and a padded dashboard.

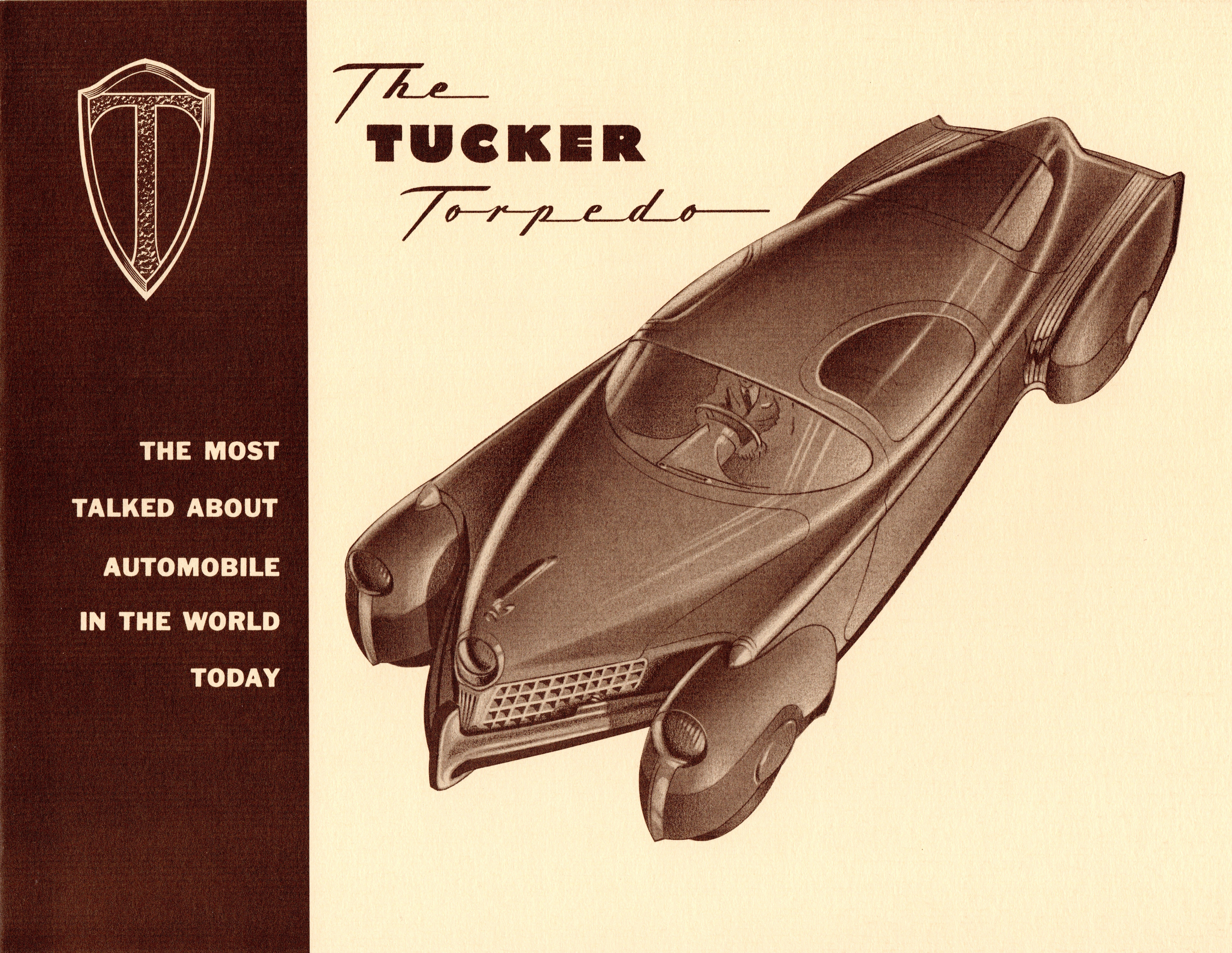
Tucker Torpedo brochure, c. 1947. This concept drawing includes a centrally positioned steering wheel, doors that wrap up into the roof, and front fenders that turn when the car is cornering. These features did not reach production.

Before the war's end, Preston Tucker began working on plans for his new automobile. In the summer of 1944, he hired noted car designer George S. Lawson to style his new automobile. Lawson worked on the project for over a year and a half before his design debuted publicly, beginning about February 1946 and found as late as a year later in March 1947. Lawson was named the Tucker Corporation's "chief stylist" in February 1946, immediately upon the company's formation.

In December 1946, Lawson resigned from the company after a disagreement with Preston Tucker, and shortly thereafter, stylist Alex Tremulis of local Chicago design firm Tammen & Denison was hired and furthered the development of the Lawson design. Tucker gave Tammen & Denison and Tremulis a three-month contract, which expired in March 1947 and was not renewed. The culmination of Tremulis' efforts during this phase of design development was featured in a full-page advertisement run in numerous national newspapers in March 1947. Tremulis' design was based directly upon the work of George Lawson, but incorporated his own artistic flair.

Simultaneous with Tremulis' departure, Preston Tucker hired a team of five designers (Read Viemeister, Budd Steinhilber, Tucker Madawick, Hal Bergstrom and Phillip Egan) from the New York design firm J. Gordon Lippincott, who updated Tremulis' design just as Tremulis had done with Lawson's.

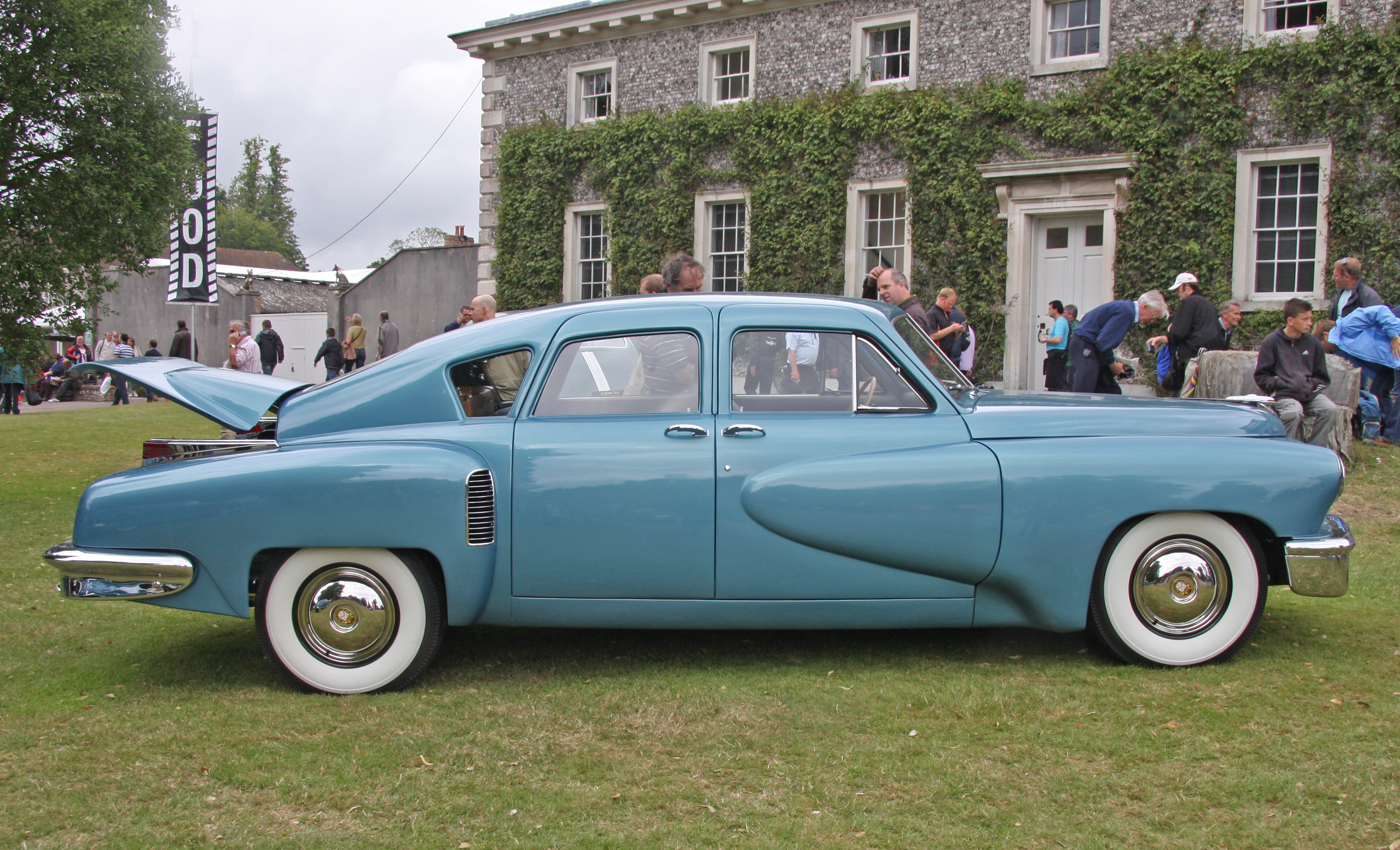
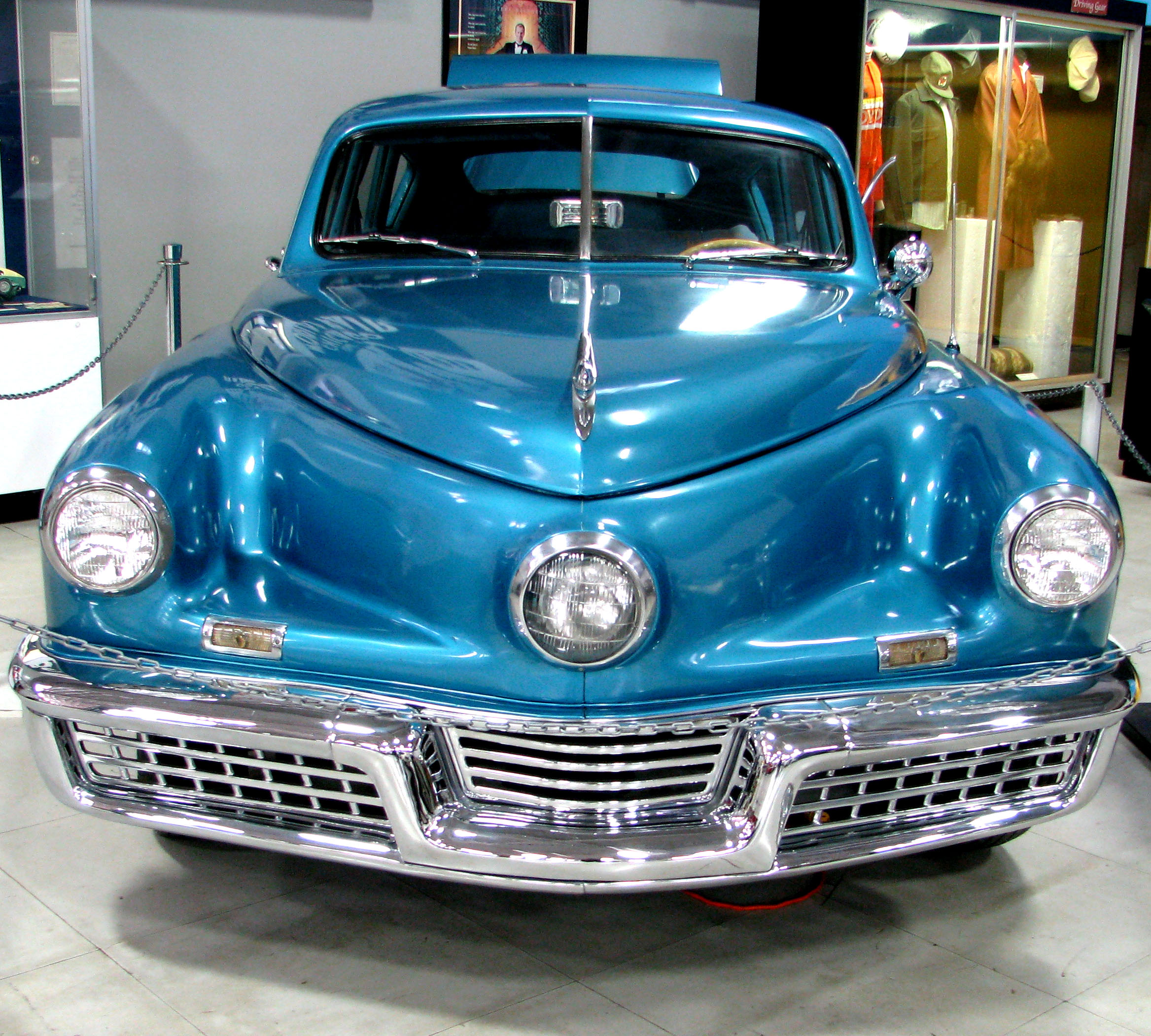
(Left): Tucker Torpedo photographed at the 2008 Goodwood Festival of Speed, England; (right): Tucker 48 at the San Diego Automotive Museum

After a month's absence, Tremulis was rehired and the two independent design groups developed full-size clay models side by side in direct competition. Surviving photographs of the two models reveal that Tremulis' clay design remained unchanged from his March 1947 advertisement proposal and was not chosen for production. The passenger side of the Lippincott team's clay model (they submitted two designs), which incorporated the side profile developed by Tremulis prior to their arrival, was chosen virtually intact for the production automobile's styling.

The Tucker 48's evolving appearance in the company's press releases and other promotional materials, combined with suggestive statements such as "15 years of testing produced the car of the year"—despite no running prototype existing at the time—were instrumental in the SEC filing mail and conspiracy fraud charges against Preston Tucker. The SEC, however, failed to prove its case, and Tucker was acquitted of all charges in January 1950. However, the company never recovered.

Tremulis, like George Lawson, was eventually named the Tucker Corporation's "chief stylist", although the first reference to him holding this position does not appear until 1948, after the Tucker 48's exterior styling was completed.

The Tucker automobile was originally named the "Torpedo", but was changed to "Tucker '48" around the time of Lawson's departure and Tremulis' arrival, reportedly because Tucker did not want to remind the public of the horrors of World War II. Despite the name change, the Tucker 48 is still often referred to as the Tucker Torpedo. Alex Tremulis has claimed responsibility for dubbing the first prototype automobile the "Tin Goose", a name which is presently used in an affectionate manner but at the time was considered derogatory.

== Innovative design features ==
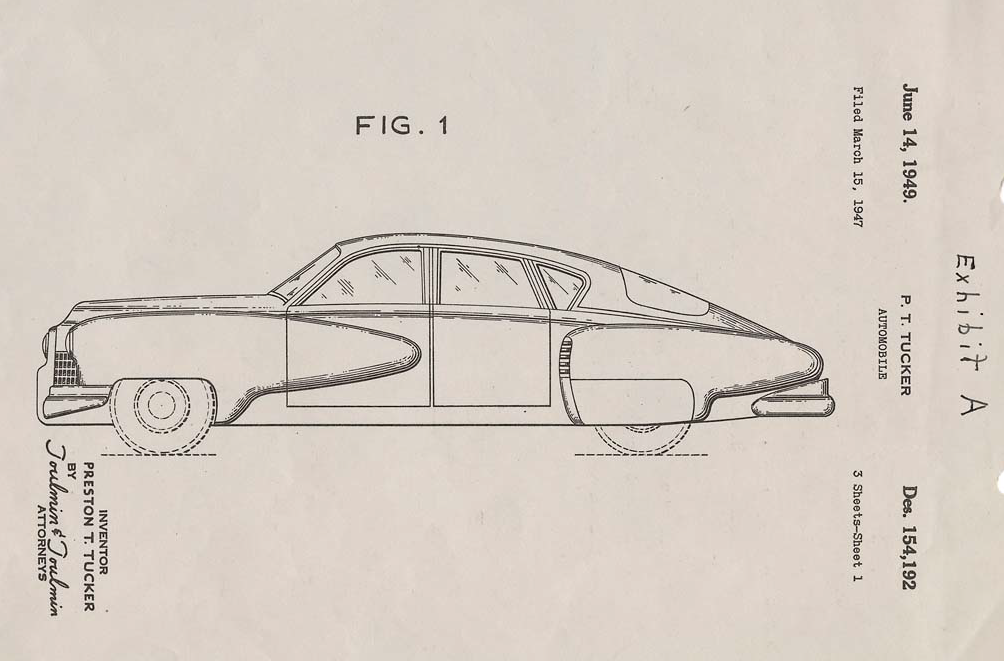
A Tucker 48 Sedan design patent illustration

The Tucker was a pioneer in terms of engineering and safety features. A rear engine, rear wheel drive configuration had been employed in Tatras and Volkswagens, and headlamps that turned with the front wheels had been available since the 1920s, but they would have been firsts for a modern American production car. The most recognizable feature of the Tucker 48 was a third directional headlamp. Centrally located, it would activate at steering angles of greater than 10 degrees to light the car's path around corners. At the time, 17 states had laws against cars having more than two headlights. Tucker fabricated a cover for the center light for use in these states.

The car had a rear engine and rear-wheel drive. A perimeter frame surrounded the vehicle for crash protection, as well as a roll bar integrated into the roof. The steering box was behind the front axle to protect the driver in a front-end accident. The instrument panel and all controls were within easy reach of the steering wheel, and the dashboard was padded for safety. The windshield was made of shatterproof glass and designed to pop out in a collision to protect occupants. The car's parking brake had a separate key so it could be locked in place to prevent theft. The doors extended into the roof, to ease entry and exit. Each Tucker that was built differed somewhat from the previous car, as each car built was basically a "prototype" where design features and engineering concepts were tried, improved, or discarded throughout the production cycle. The door releases on the interior of the Tucker came from the Lincoln-Zephyr. The steering columns used in the Tucker were donated by Ford and are from the 1941 Lincoln. Preston Tucker held a patent for a collapsible steering column design. A glove box was added to the front door panels instead of the more conventional location in the dashboard to provide space for the "crash chamber" that the Tucker is now famous for. This is a padded area ahead of the passenger seat, free from obstructions, providing the front seat passengers an area to protect themselves in the event of an accident. The engine and transmission were mounted on a separate subframe which was secured with only six bolts. The entire drive train could thus be lowered and removed from the car in minutes. Tucker envisioned loaner engines being quickly swapped in for service in just 30 minutes.

Tucker envisioned several other innovations that were later abandoned. Magnesium wheels, disc brakes, fuel injection, self-sealing tubeless tires, and a direct-drive torque converter transmission were all evaluated or tested, but were dropped on the final prototype due to cost, engineering complexity, and lack of time to develop.

Tucker initially tried to develop an innovative engine, with help from Ben Parsons, then owner and president of the Fuelcharger Corporation, and would later be Tucker's VP of engineering. It was a 589 cubic inches (9.7 L) flat-6 cylinder with hemispherical combustion chambers, fuel injection, and overhead valves operated by oil pressure rather than a camshaft. An oil pressure distributor was mounted in line with the ignition distributor and delivered appropriately timed direct oil pressure to open each valve at proper intervals. The oil pressure fed to each valve was "timed" by intake and exhaust eccentrics and measured by spring-loaded plungers. It had large pistons built of aluminum and magnesium castings with steel-plated cylinder linings. This unique engine was designed to idle at 100 rpm and cruise at 250–1200 rpm through the use of direct-drive torque converters on each driving wheel instead of a transmission. It was designed to produce almost 200 hp (149 kW) and 450 lb⋅ft (610 N⋅m) of torque at only 1800 rpm. When cruising at 60 mph (100 km/h), it would only turn at approximately 1000 rpm. These features would have been auto industry firsts in 1948, but as engine development proceeded, problems appeared. Six prototypes of the 589 engine were built, but it was installed only in the test chassis and the first prototype.

== Troubled premiere ==
The world premiere of the much-hyped Tucker 48 car was set for June 19, 1947. Over 3,000 people showed up at the factory in Chicago for lunch, a train tour of the plant, and the unveiling of the first prototype. The unveiling appeared doomed, however, as last-minute problems cropped up. The night before the premiere, two of the prototype's independent suspension arms snapped under the car's weight. (The prototype was extremely heavy, much heavier than the other 48s.) Minor engine problems were fixed, and the car was presentable by the time of the premiere. However, the experimental 589 engine was extremely loud. Tucker told the band to play as loud as possible to drown out the noise. Additionally the high-voltage starter required the use of outside power to get the engine started, so Tucker had the engineering team keep the engine running during the entire event, fearing that the public would see how much effort was required to get the engine started. As the car was driven on to the platform, the liquid coolant boiled over and some steam escaped from the car, but no one seemed to notice.

Drew Pearson, one of the top newspaper columnists of his time, reported publicly that the car was a fraud because it could not go backward and it went "goose-geese" going down the road. Although this problem was limited to the first prototype only, a symptom of the speed with which the first car was put together, the damage to the car's reputation was done, and a storm of negative media followed.

Tucker suffered another setback when his bids to obtain two steel mills to provide raw materials for his cars were rejected by the War Assets Administration under a shroud of questionable politics.

== Continued development ==
=== Engine ===
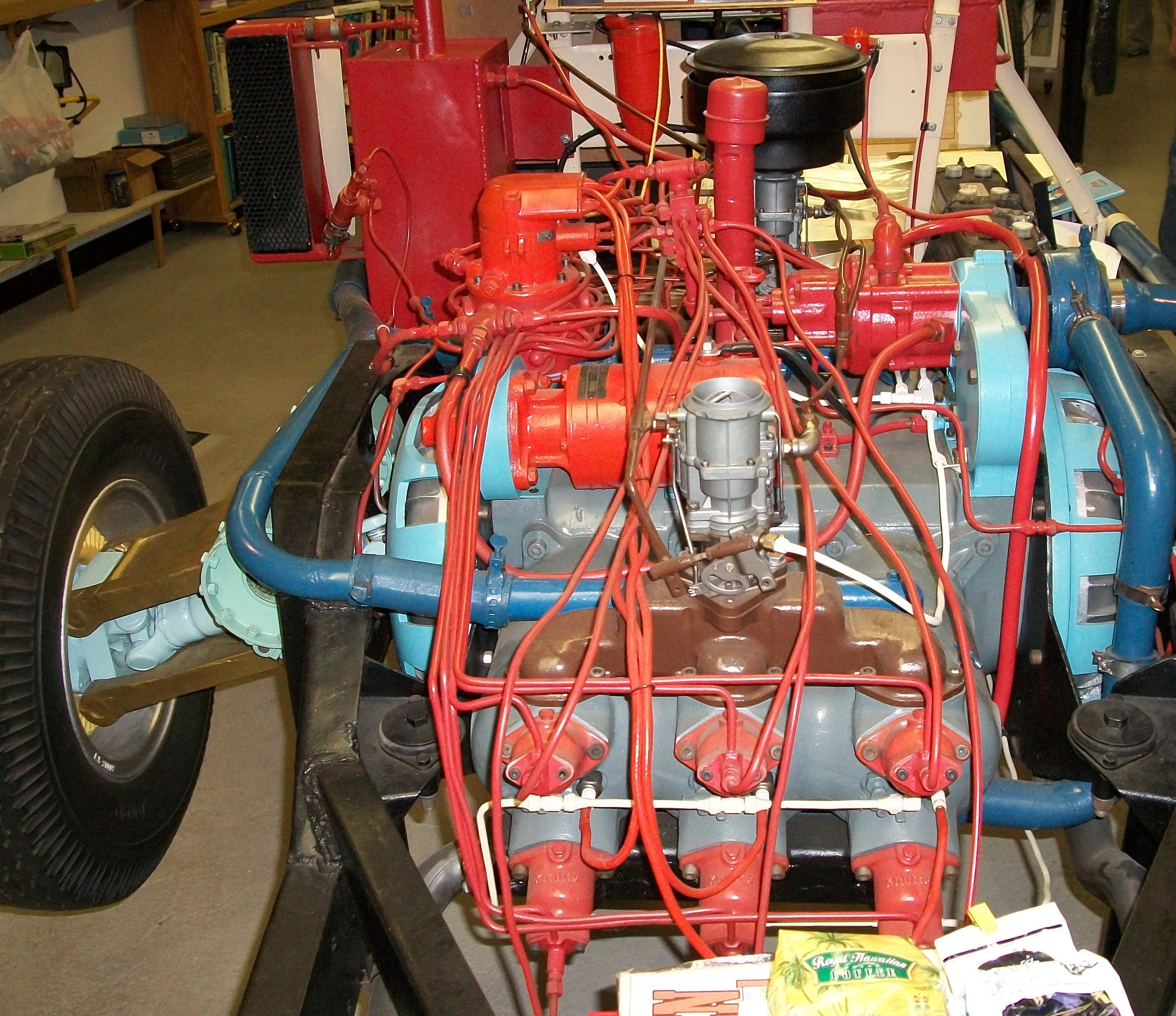
Tucker 589cu.in. prototype direct drive engine. (Note torque converters at each end and the early rubber disk-type suspension used on prototype.)

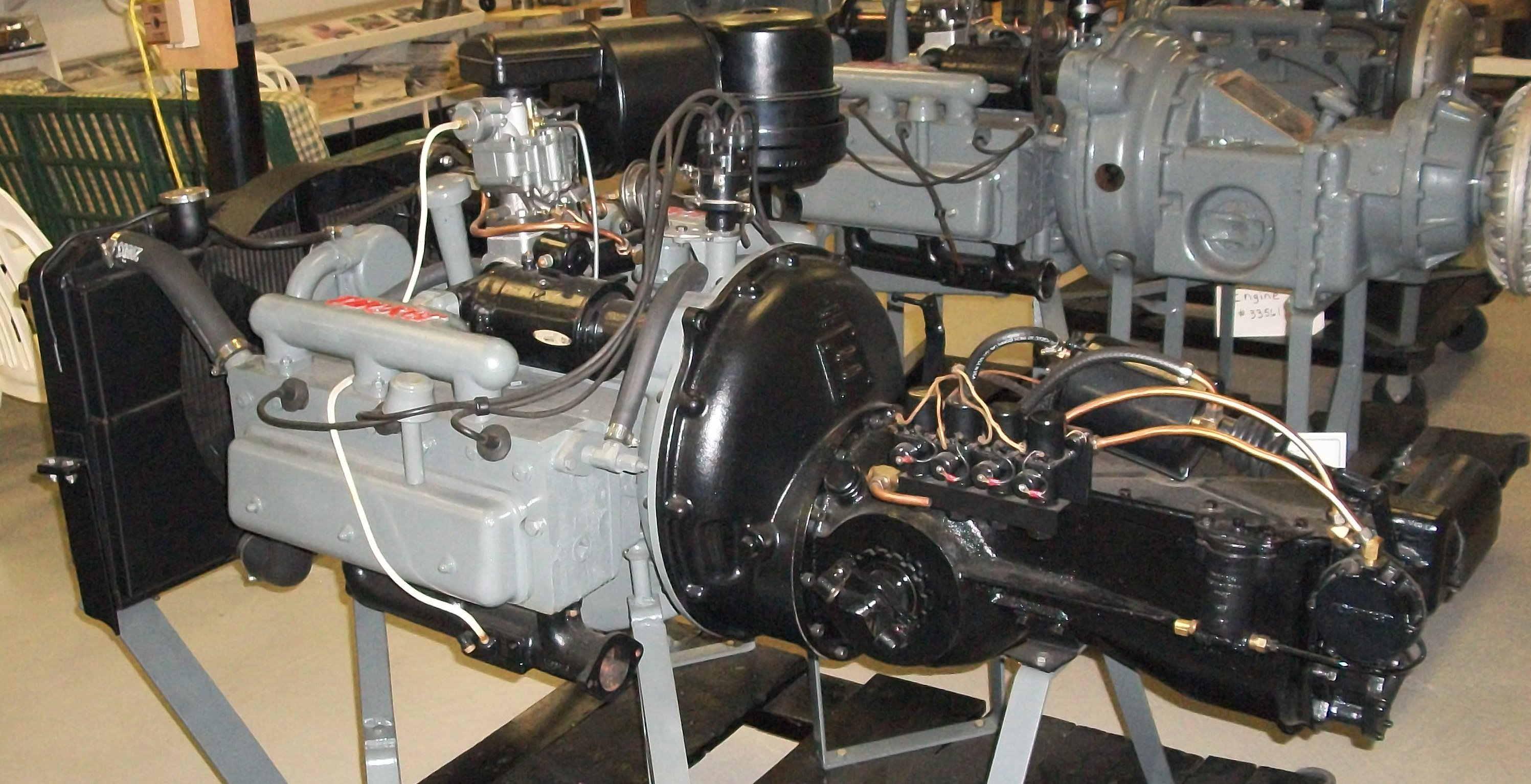
Franklin O-335 engine and Tucker Y-1 transmission

Tucker had promised 150 hp (112 kW), but his innovative engine was not working out. The valve train proved problematic and the engine only produced approximately 88 hp (66 kW). The high oil pressure required a 24-volt electrical system, up to 60 volts to get it started, and a long cranking time at start-up. Additionally, the oil pressure required to maintain valve function was not achieved until the engine was turning at higher engine speeds and Tucker's engineers struggled with keeping the valve train working at idle and lower engine speeds. Having wasted nearly a year trying to make the 589 work, Tucker started looking for alternatives.

The company first tried the Lycoming aircraft engine, but it would not fit in the car's rear engine compartment.

An air-cooled flat-6 engine, the Franklin O-335 made by Air Cooled Motors (and originally intended for the Bell 47 helicopter), fit, and its 166 hp (124 kW) pleased Tucker. He purchased four samples for $5,000 each, and his engineers converted the 334 cubic inches (5,470 cc) engine to water cooling (a decision that has puzzled historians ever since). The Franklin engine was heavily modified by Tucker's engineers, including Eddie Offutt and Tucker's son Preston, Jr. at his Ypsilanti machine shop. Using an aircraft engine in an automotive application required significant modification; thus, very few parts of the original Franklin engine were retained in the final Tucker engine. This durable modification of the engine was tested at maximum power for 150 hours, the equivalent of 18,000 miles (29,000 km), at full throttle.

Tucker quickly bought Air Cooled Motors for $1.8 million to secure the engine source, then canceled all of the company's aircraft contracts so its resources could be focused on making automotive engines. This was a significant decision, since at the time of Tucker's purchase, Air Cooled Motors held over 65% of post-war U.S. aviation engine production contracts. The loss of income was substantial.

=== Transmission ===
With the horizontal, between-the-wheels 589 engine and its double torque converter(s) (and no reverse) drive system out, Tucker now needed a transmission to mate with the Franklin O-335. This engine was also horizontal, but its driveshaft pointed towards the front of the car. It was discovered, after a few sketches were made, that it was theoretically possible to adapt a previous transmission design intended for front-engine/front wheel drive use. This transmission served as a temporary "fix" for a very real problem for the success of the Tucker.

==== Pre-Selector manual transmission ====
It was discovered that the front-wheel-drive Cord 810/812's Auburn Gear, 4-speed transmission, with the Bendix "Electric Hand" electro-vacuum shifting mechanism, fit the immediate design requirements needed to get the cars built and on the road until a future, automatic in-house transmission was available. This transmission was originally designed to sit behind a standard V8 engine, pointing towards the driven front wheels of the car. However, this transmission had a poor reputation following its original use in the Cord 810: In 1936, when the Cord 810 made its debut at the New York Automobile show, the transmissions were so problematic that they were mostly shown without any transmission installed. Problems abounded until the last Cord was produced in 1937.

The Cord transmissions, even with refurbishing, were initially inadequate for the power and torque of the O-335 engine. They lacked adequate lubrication and the main shaft was so long that it warped under load (causing gears to pop out of play), and the gear-teeth were quite weak. Nevertheless, this transmission worked well enough for the Tucker: it provided an adequate (albeit fragile) transmission, with a reverse gear. The company sent several of its staff, including Preston Tucker Jr., on a campaign to buy used Cord transmissions for reconditioning; a total of 22 used transmissions were acquired from junkyards and used car dealers. These transmissions were taken to the Ypsilanti Machine And Tool Company to be refurbished, mated to the O-335 engine and found to work. It was consequently decided that the 12-year old Cord design would become the standard manual transmission for the 1948 and subsequent Tucker automobiles. Since the Y-1 transmission was not yet available, 18 of the 22 Cord transmissions were deemed usable and were installed in production Tucker vehicles. Several of the cars have survived with Cord transmissions.

==== Ypsilanti Y-1 transmission ====
Ypsilanti Machine and Tool Company, which was tapped to recondition the Cord units, began immediately redesigning the transmission for mass production for Tucker. This new design, which had few similar parts to the Cord transmission, still used the same basic indirect transmission design, but had all new gearing, shafts and electro-vacuum controls. Tucker and his engineers modified it, installing stronger gears and lengthening the case. The modified Cord transmission was named the Tucker Y-1 (Ypsilanti-1) and was installed in a few Tuckers. Both also used a Bendix designed electric vacuum shift mechanism with no mechanical linkage to the steering column shift lever. These EVS's had problems of their own with electrical connections and vacuum leaks that hindered shifting, so a new fully mechanical shift design would have been needed, had the Tucker made it into 1949.

==== Tuckermatic drive ====
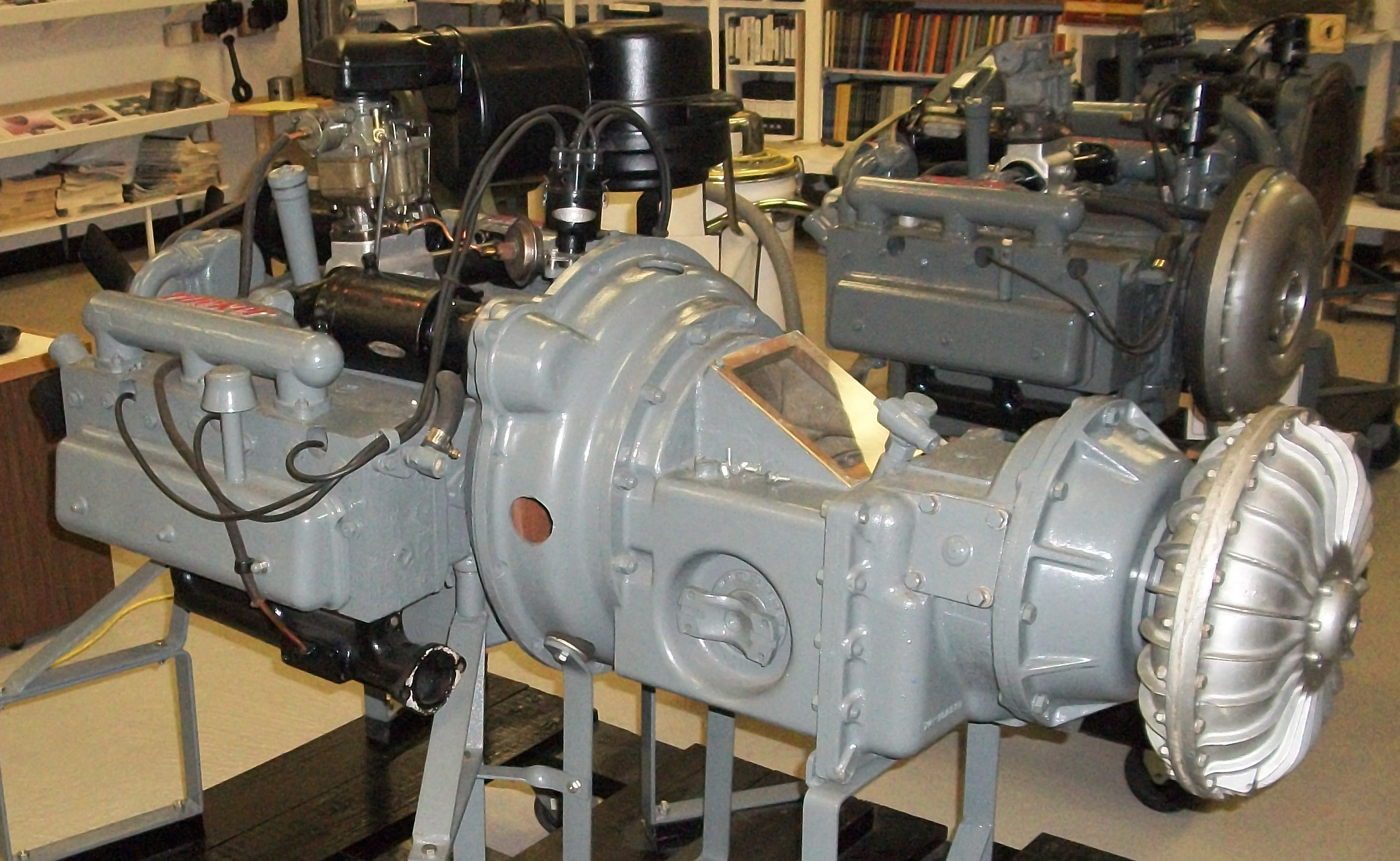
Tucker 335 engine and Tuckermatic R-1-2 transmission (trans recovered from car #1042; note second torque converter on the end)

To solve the transmission problems with a new final transmission design, Warren Rice, creator of the Buick Dynaflow transmission, was consulted. A unique continuously variable transmission called the "Tuckermatic" was designed, which was strong enough to handle the Franklin O-335's power and torque. It was a simple but effective design with a single, rear-mounted torque converter and only 27 basic moving parts which was about 90 fewer than normally required for a contemporary automatic. The variable pitch torque converter allowed a continuously variable drive ratio with two forward gears and one reverse gear.

The only surviving car with a Tuckermatic installed had a standard column shift lever, with a three position quadrant on the steering column. Up was reverse, the middle was neutral, and down was drive. Due to the Tuckermatic's design, no lower gear selections were necessary, hence there was no need for a multi gated selector like other automatics.

Three versions of the Tuckermatic were made: the R-1, R-1-2, and R-3 (R for Warren Rice, its designer). The first version, the R-1, was not installed on any of the final cars. It required the engine to be off in order to select a gear. The R-1-2 was improved by adding a layshaft brake to allow gear selection while the engine was running. This version was installed on cars #1026 and 1042 only. The R-3 version had further improvements including a centrifugal clutch to help shifting between forward and reverse even further, and may have been destined for car #1048 for further testing.

Because the external torque converter on the Tuckermatic made the engine-transmission unit longer, the fuel tank in the Tucker 48 had to be moved from behind the rear seat to in front of the dashboard for all Tuckers from car #1026 forward, even though only two of them actually had the Tuckermatic installed. This had the added advantage of improving weight distribution in the car.

==== Other drives contemplated ====
A Borg-Warner based, 3-speed automatic was supposedly tested and was installed on car #1048 at some point when the company was in business, although no histories written ever mentioned such a drive. That said, Tucker ultimately wanted to design his own transmission for the final car, which came to fruition with the Tuckermatic. In 1949, #1048 was sold at the receivership auction without a transmission installed. Today, #1048 has the 4 speed pre-selector transmission that was used on all but two of the original 50 pilot models. It is likely this transmission was privately installed after the auction, and that the unit was the Ypsilanti-built Y-1 transmission.

=== Suspension and body ===
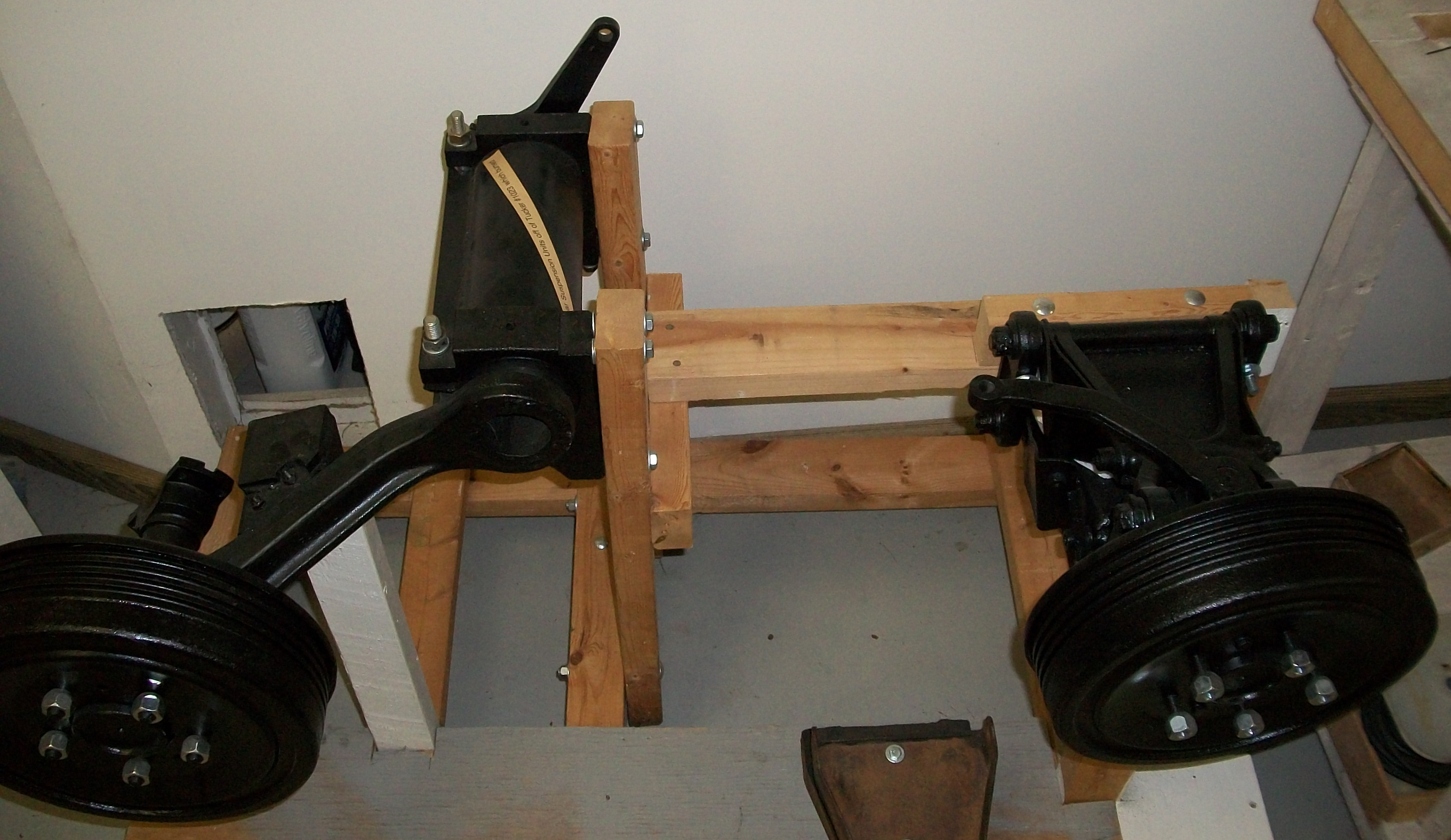
Tucker rear suspension rubber torsion tube (left) and Sandwich type front suspension (right) used on cars #1001–1025

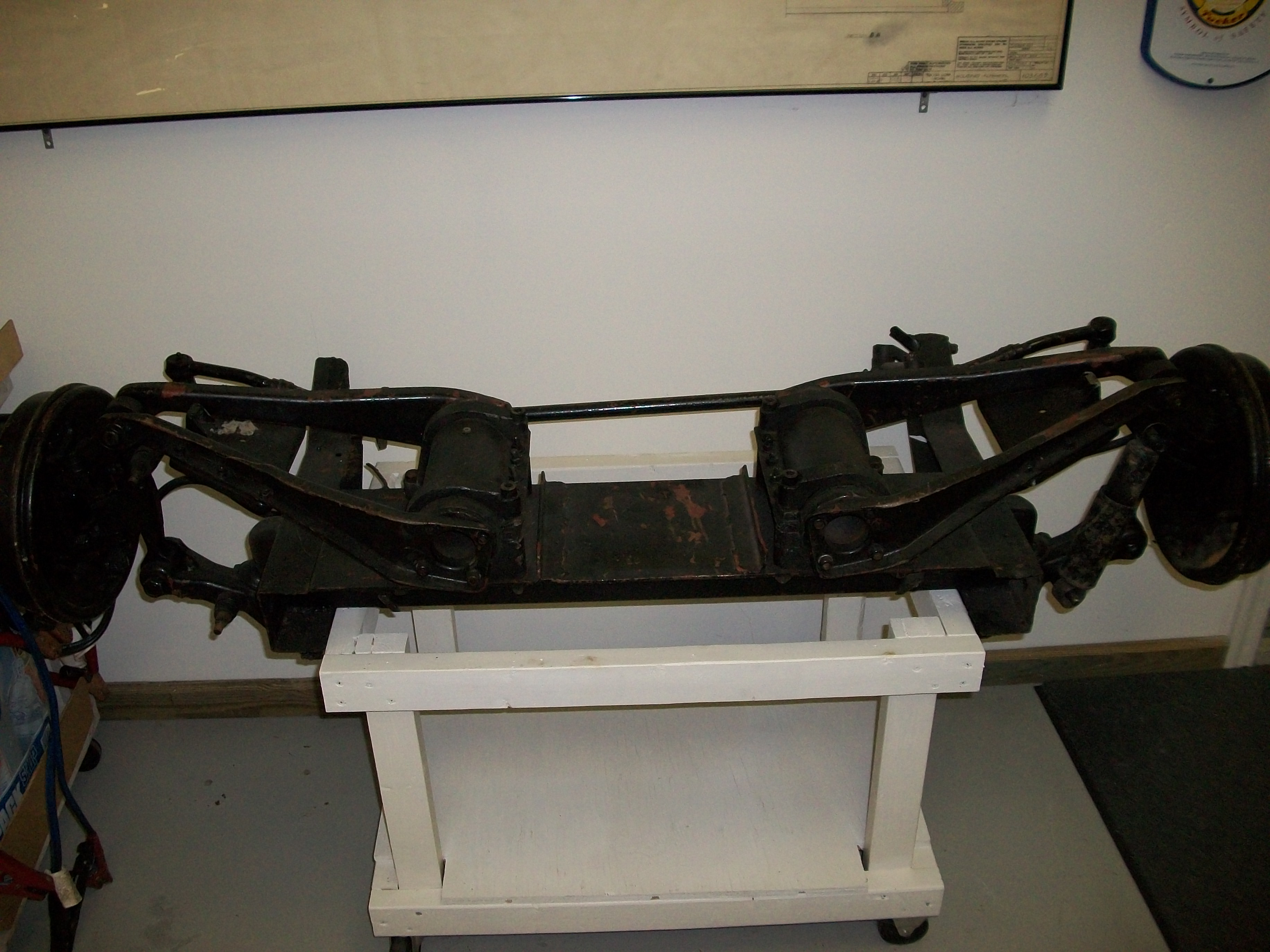
Tucker Rubber Torsion Tube (version2) Front Suspension used on car #1026-on. This unit taken from car #1046 for V8 conversion.

Suspension designs, especially the front suspension, had to be changed throughout development. Rather than steel springs, Tucker used an elastomeric (rubber) 4-wheel independent suspension similar to what was used on the race cars he developed with Harry Miller at the Indianapolis 500. The rubber elastomers were developed with assistance from the Firestone Tire Company and used a special vulcanization process to produce a specific spring rate.

Tucker's suspension designs were plagued with severe stiffness throughout development, which, while good for handling, caused front-wheel corner lift when cornering on uneven surfaces. The test bed and the prototype had a double-rubber disc type front and rear suspension, similar to Miller's race cars, which was too weak for the weight of a passenger car. On cars #1001 and 1002 the rear wheels could not be removed without removing the fender or suspension due to the stiffness of the suspension and the rear wheel arch fender design. From car #1003 on, the rear fender shape was changed so the tire could be removed easily. Aside from the fender changes, the rear suspension remained the same from car #1001 on.

Three versions of the front suspension were installed in the cars (aside from the rubber-disc style used on the prototype). Cars #1001–1002 used a rubber torsion tube design, which suffered from severe toe-in during heavy braking. Tucker then switched to a rubber sandwich type suspension (with a rubber block sandwiched between the upper and lower A-arms) on cars #1003–1025, however, this type was severely stiff. Starting on car #1026, Tucker finally settled on a suspension design with a modified version of the rubber torsion tube with the toe-in braking problem corrected.

Original Tucker paint color codes:

- 100: Black
- 200: Waltz Blue
- 300: Green
- 400: Beige
- 500: Grey (Silver)
- 600: Maroon

Original Tucker interior trim color codes:

- 900: Green
- 920: Blue
- 940: Beige

=== Funding and publicity ===
Having raised $17,000,000 in a stock issue, one of the first speculative IPOs, Tucker needed more money to continue development of the car. He sold dealerships and distributorships throughout the country. Another money maker was the Tucker Accessories Program. In order to secure a spot on the Tucker waiting list, future buyers could purchase accessories, like seat covers, radio, and luggage, before their car was built. This brought in an additional $2,000,000.

With the final design in place, Preston Tucker took the pre-production cars on the road to show them in towns across the country. The cars were an instant success, with crowds gathering wherever they stopped. One report says Tucker was pulled over by a police officer intent on getting a better look at the car.

To prove the road-worthiness of his cars, Tucker and his engineers ran several cars at the Indianapolis Motor Speedway in several endurance tests. During this testing, car #1027 was rolled three times at 95 miles per hour (153 km/h), and the driver (chief mechanic Eddie Offutt) walked away with just bruises. During the crash, the windshield popped out as designed, verifying Tucker's safety features were effective. Afterwards, upon replacing a damaged tire, the car started up and was driven off the track.

== SEC investigation and demise ==
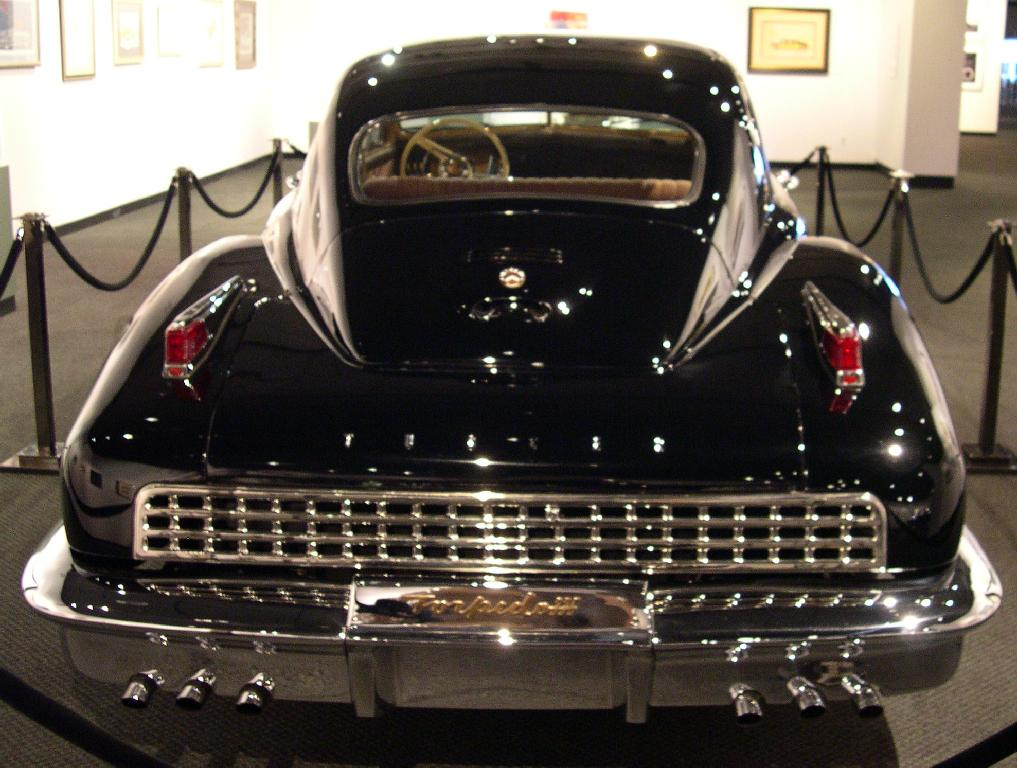
1948 Tucker at Petersen Automotive Museum, Los Angeles, California, United States

One of Tucker's most innovative business ideas caused trouble for the company. His Accessories Program raised funds by selling accessories before the car was even in production. After the war, demand for new cars was greater than dealers could supply and most dealers had waiting lists for new cars. Preference was given to returning veterans which meant that non-veterans were bumped down on the waiting lists indefinitely. Tucker's program allowed potential buyers who purchased Tucker accessories to obtain a guaranteed spot on the Tucker dealer waiting list for a Tucker 48 car.

This concept was investigated by the U.S. Securities and Exchange Commission and the United States Attorney, and led to an indictment of company executives. Although all charges were eventually dropped, the negative publicity destroyed the company and halted production of the car.

== Specific vehicles ==
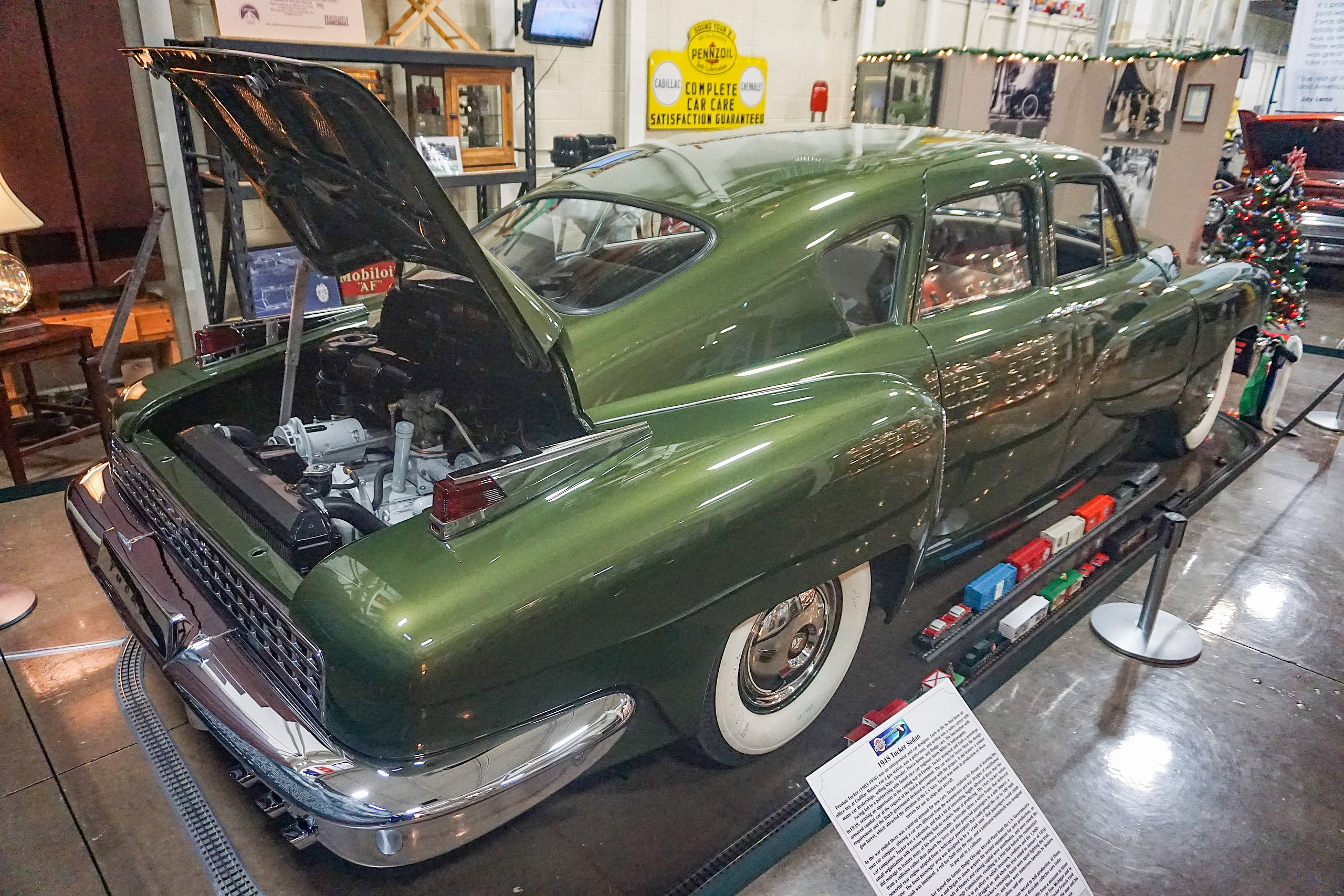
Tucker 48 at Stahls Automotive Collection

The first Tucker produced was a prototype sedan, known as the "Tin Goose". 58 frames and bodies were built at the factory. From these parts, 36 sedans were finished before the factory was closed. After the factory closed, but before liquidation of his assets, Tucker retained a core of employees who assembled an additional 14 sedans, for a total of 50. A 51st car was partially completed. A few of the remaining frames and bodies were built into complete cars specifically #1052 and #1057 (the 1949 prototype with design changes), but the fate of the others is unknown.

In the early 1950s, Ft. Lauderdale, Florida, fairgrounds owner Nick Jenin purchased over ten Tuckers, the original Tucker testbed chassis, numerous Tucker parts, photos and documents. He developed a traveling display called "The Fabulous Tuckers". He hauled the cars and memorabilia around the country for nearly 10 years displaying them at fairgrounds and car shows. His display highlighted the questionable policies and SEC fraud investigation which brought Tucker down.

When the cars appear at auction, which is rare, they command prices attained by only a few marquee cars. In August 2010, Tucker #1045 sold for $1.127 million, while Tucker #1043 went for $2.915 million at an auction in 2012.

Complete Tucker 48s #0000–1050 Completed at the Tucker Factory
| Chassis number | Location | Status | Owner | Engine | Transmission | Front suspension version | Original body color/paint code |
|---|---|---|---|---|---|---|---|
| 0000 | Huntingdon, Pennsylvania | Intact | Swigart Antique Auto Museum | Tucker 589 cu in. Direct Drive (original) Franklin O-335 (after first showing) | Direct drive torque converters (original) Tucker Y-1 (after first showing) | Rubber Disc Type | Maroon/600 |
| 0000 | The prototype model. Tucker #0000 was the only complete Tucker with Rubber Disc prototype suspension, the 589 engine, and direct torque converter drive (with no reverse gear). After the first showing, it was converted to an O-335/Y-1 at the Tucker factory. | | | | | | |
| 1001 | Hershey, Pennsylvania | Intact | AACA Museum | Franklin O-335 | Tucker Y-1 | Rubber Torsion Tube 1 | Maroon/600 |
| 1001 | Tucker #1001 was previously owned by David Cammack as part of the Tucker Collection in Alexandria, Virginia. Upon Cammack's death in 2013, his entire extensive Tucker collection was donated to the AACA Museum in Hershey, Pennsylvania. | | | | | | |
| 1002 | Clayton, Ohio | Intact | Privately owned | Franklin O-335 | Tucker Y-1 | Rubber Torsion Tube 1 | Waltz Blue/200 |
| 1002 | Tucker #1002 was the last Tucker produced with Rubber Torsion Tube 1 front suspension, which was plagued by severe toe-in when braking and was replaced with Rubber Sandwich from Tucker #1003 on. The rear fenders were also changed from #1003 on to allow rear wheel removal. | | | | | | |
| 1003 | Campos do Jordão, Brazil | Intact | Privately owned | Franklin O-335 | Tucker Y-1 | Rubber Sandwich | Maroon/600 |
| 1003 | Tucker #1003 was on display at the Academy of Art University Automobile Museum in San Francisco. Sold at Gooding & Co's Pebble Beach Auction in 2014 for $2,035,000. The car is currently on display at the CARDE Automotive Museum in Campos do Jordão, Brazil | | | | | | |
| 1004 | Nagakute, Japan | Intact | Toyota Automobile Museum | Franklin O-335 | Tucker Y-1 | Rubber Sandwich | Grey(Silver)/500 |
| 1004 | Tucker #1004 was originally Grey(Silver)/500, but was painted Maroon/600 when it was restored in 1978. Was reportedly entered in two NASCAR races in 1950. | | | | | | |
| 1005 | Tallahassee, Florida | Intact | Tallahassee Automobile Museum | Franklin O-335 | Tucker Y-1 | Rubber Sandwich | Waltz Blue/200 |
| 1006 | Clayton, Ohio | Intact | Privately Owned | Franklin O-335 | Tucker Y-1 | Rubber Sandwich | Green/300 |
| 1007 | Tacoma, Washington | Intact | LeMay Family Collection | Franklin O-335 | Tucker Y-1 | Rubber Sandwich | Green/300 |
| 1007 | Tucker #1007 left the factory in the Green/300 with the Green/900 interior trim, one of eight to be produced in green. During the early 1960s, Tucker #1007 was painted a bright red-orange, then later painted black, then lastly painted its present deep metallic blue color in the early 1990s. It is currently on display in the LeMay Family Collection at the Marymount Event Center in Tacoma, Washington. | | | | | | |
| 1008 | Chicago, Illinois | Intact | Chicago Vintage Motor Carriage | Franklin O-335 | Tucker Y-1 | Rubber Sandwich | Beige/400 |
| 1008 | Tucker #1008 was originally Beige/400 but is now Maroon/600. It is currently located in the Richard Driehaus Collection at Chicago Vintage Motor Carriage. | | | | | | |
| 1009 | California | Intact | Lucasfilm | Franklin O-335 | Tucker Y-1 | Rubber Sandwich | Grey(Silver)/500 |
| 1010 | Scottsdale, Arizona | Intact | Privately owned | Franklin O-335 | Tucker Y-1 | Rubber Sandwich | Waltz Blue/200 |
| 1010 | After being stored in a barn near Tacoma, Washington for 50 years, Tucker #1010 was sent to auction in January 2011 via Gooding and Co. in Scottsdale, Arizona for a starting bid of $750,000. Reports and photos indicate the vehicle is in major need of restoration: the engine was reportedly seized, with rust damage throughout the vehicle and some minor exterior parts missing, including the original hubcaps. | | | | | | |
| 1011 | Montana | Intact | Privately owned | Franklin O-335 | Tucker Y-1 | Rubber Sandwich | Beige/400 |
| 1012 | LaPorte, Indiana | Intact | La Porte County Historical Society Museum | Franklin O-335 | Tucker Y-1 | Rubber Sandwich | Maroon/600 |
| 1012 | Tucker #1012 is on public display at the La Porte County Historical Society Museum as part of the Kesling Auto Collection. | | | | | | |
| 1013 | Huntingdon, Pennsylvania | Intact | Swigart Antique Auto Museum | Franklin O-335 | Tucker Y-1 | Rubber Sandwich | Waltz Blue/200 |
| 1013 | Tucker #1013 was featured in the movie. It was restored by students at Pennsylvania College of Technology in 2024. | | | | | | |
| 1014 | Unknown | Intact | Privately owned | Franklin O-335 | Tucker Y-1 | Rubber Sandwich | Waltz Blue/200 |
| 1014 | Tucker #1014 was sold at auction by Francis Ford Coppola at Pebble Beach in August 2025 for $1,545,000. | | | | | | |
| 1015 | St. Clair Shores, Michigan | Intact | Stahls Collection | Franklin O-335 | Cord 810/812 | Rubber Sandwich | Green/300 |
| 1016 | Dearborn, Michigan | Intact | The Henry Ford | Franklin O-335 | Tucker Y-1 | Rubber Sandwich | Black/100 |
| 1017 | Manhattan, Kansas | Intact | Midwest Dream Car Collection | Franklin O-335 | Tucker Y-1 | Rubber Sandwich | Green/300 |
| 1018 | Grand Rapids, Michigan | Destroyed | Privately owned | Franklin O-335 | Tucker Y-1 | Rubber Sandwich | Beige/400 |
| 1018 | Tucker #1018 was damaged beyond repair in 1948 after broadsiding a tree in South Wales, New York. The remnants of the frame are located in Grand Rapids, Michigan. Some body panels are in Roscoe, Illinois, with the owner of Tucker #1027. The engine and Y-1 transmission from #1018 are located at the AACA Museum in Hershey, Pennsylvania. The front end sheet metal from #1018 was used to complete Tucker #1052 in 2015. In 2026, the AACA plans to reunite chassis and various components under a "clear" body for educational and display purposes. | | | | | | |
| 1019 | California | Intact | Privately owned | Franklin O-335 | Tucker Y-1 | Rubber Sandwich | Grey/500 |
| 1019 | Tucker #1019 was painted light blue by its owner in 1959, shortly after purchasing the car. It was repainted again a few years later in a metallic blue shade approximating Waltz Blue; this color remains on the car to this day. | | | | | | |
| 1020 | Japan | Intact | Hani Corporation | Franklin O-335 | Tucker Y-1 | Rubber Sandwich | Maroon/600 |
| 1021 | Arizona | Intact | Martin Auto Museum and Event Center | Franklin O-335 | Tucker Y-1 | Rubber Sandwich | Black/100 |
| 1022 | Hershey, Pennsylvania | Intact | AACA Museum | Franklin O-335 | Tucker Y-1 | Rubber Sandwich | Grey(Silver)/500 |
| 1022 | Tucker #1022 was previously owned by David Cammack as part of the Tucker Collection in Alexandria, Virginia. Upon Cammack's death in 2013 his entire extensive Tucker collection was donated to the AACA museum in Hershey, Pennsylvania. | | | | | | |
| 1023 | DeLand, Florida | Destroyed | Privately owned | | Tucker Y-1 | Rubber Sandwich | Maroon/600 |
| 1023 | Tucker #1023 was destroyed by fire in 1978 while in storage in a DeLand, Florida warehouse, awaiting restoration. The warehouse burned to the ground. The car's remains were crushed in 1980 by its owner, a founder of the Tucker Automobile Club of America. | | | | | | |
| 1024 | Lincoln, Nebraska | Intact | Museum of American Speed | Franklin O-335 | Tucker Y-1 | Rubber Sandwich | Waltz Blue/200 |
| 1025 | Frankfort, Indiana | Intact | Goodwin Collection | Franklin O-335 | Cord 810/812 | Rubber Sandwich | Green/300 |
| 1025 | Tucker #1025 was the last Tucker produced with Rubber Sandwich front suspension, which was abandoned due to severe stiffness issues and replaced with Rubber Torsion Tube 2 from Tucker #1026 on. | | | | | | |
| 1026 | Hershey, Pennsylvania | Intact | AACA Museum | Franklin O-335 | Tuckermatic R-1-2 | Rubber Torsion Tube 2 | Maroon/600 |
| 1026 | Tucker #1026 is the only remaining complete Tucker with the Tuckermatic transmission. Car #1026 was previously owned by David Cammack as part of the Tucker Collection in Alexandria, Virginia. Upon Cammack's death in 2013 his entire extensive Tucker collection was donated to the AACA Museum in Hershey, Pennsylvania. | | | | | | |
| 1027 | Unknown | Destroyed | Unknown | Franklin O-335 | Unknown | Rubber Torsion Tube 2 | Waltz Blue/200 |
| 1027 | Tucker #1027 was rolled during testing at Indianapolis Motor Speedway by Tucker in 1948. The engine and transmission were removed at the factory, and the chassis was sold at the factory auction. The ACAA Museum used to own some body panels to wrecked Tucker #1018, other parts were either lost or used in restoration of other Tuckers. The car was sold by the owner of Historic Auto Attractions; its current location is unknown. | | | | | | |
| 1028 | Arundel, Maine | Intact | Maine Classic Car Museum | Franklin O-335 | Cord 810/812 | Rubber Torsion Tube 2 | Beige/400 |
| 1028 | Tucker #1028 was sold in an auction at the Tupelo (Mississippi) Automobile Museum on April 27, 2019, for $1.985 million to Tim Stentiford, owner of Maine Classic Car Museum. Tucker #1028 is the only Tucker on public display in New England. | | | | | | |
| 1029 | Aliso Viejo, California | Intact | Privately owned | Franklin O-335 | Tucker Y-1 | Rubber Torsion Tube 2 | Grey(Silver)/500 |
| 1029 | Tucker #1029 was Preston Tucker's personal car that he drove for seven years until he sold it in 1955 to Winthrop Rockefeller. Until October 2017 it was located in the Lew Webb's Classic Car Museum in Aliso Viejo, California. In 2018, Tucker #1029 was auctioned by RM Sotheby's in Arizona for $1.8 million. | | | | | | |
| 1030 | Los Angeles, California | Intact | Petersen Automotive Museum | Franklin O-335 | Tucker Y-1 | Rubber Torsion Tube 2 | Black/100 |
| 1030 | Tucker #1030 is one of the vehicles used for testing at Indianapolis and a personal car of Preston Tucker. Acquired by the Petersen Museum in 1996. | | | | | | |
| 1031 | Reno, Nevada | Intact | Breslow Collection | Franklin O-335 | Tucker Y-1 | Rubber Torsion Tube 2 | Waltz Blue/200 |
| 1032 | Reno, Nevada | Intact | National Automobile Museum | Franklin O-335 | Cord 810/812 | Rubber Torsion Tube 2 | Grey(Silver)/500 |
| 1033 | South Paris, Maine | Intact | Bahre Collection | Franklin O-335 | Tucker Y-1 | Rubber Torsion Tube 2 | Maroon/600 |
| 1033 | Purportedly one of the most original Tuckers in existence, Tucker #1033 is kept in a private collection that is opened once per year in July to raise money for the town of South Paris and to benefit the Hannibal Hamlin Estate where it resides. | | | | | | |
| 1034 | Tucker, Georgia | Intact | Cofer Collection | Franklin O-335 | Tucker Y-1 | Rubber Torsion Tube 2 | Waltz Blue/200 |
| 1035 | Caçapava, Brazil | Modified | Museu Paulista de Antiguidades Mecânicas | 346 Flathead V8. Car now has a Cadillac drivetrain, original engine was used in a racing boat | Unknown | Rubber Torsion Tube 2 | Maroon/600 |
| 1035 | Tucker #1035 was exported to Brazil in 1949, where it was eventually kept in a private collection along with 50 other cars. In 1955 its owner swapped the original Tucker chassis and drivetrain for one originally belonging to a 1947 Cadillac Series 62, with the original Tucker engine being swapped into a racing boat around that time. In order to accommodate these changes, several modifications were made to the exterior of the car including a few additional trim pieces above the front bumper, not present on the original model. At some point the car was painted light blue, but it was converted back to its original color some time later. The car was sold to a museum in 1963, but its owner was unaware of the car's rarity and used it as a donor to other Cadillac models in its collection. The car then spent over 50 years in storage until it was purchased by another museum, where it is currently on display in Caçapava. On August 27, 2022, the city of Caçapava inaugurated a monument to celebrate its title of Brazil's capital of antique car collections. The monument consists of a 1:1 fiberglass replica of Tucker nº 1035 in its factory spec and color. | | | | | | |
| 1036 | Nevada | Intact | Privately owned | Franklin O-335 | Tucker Y-1 | Rubber Torsion Tube 2 | Maroon/600 |
| 1036 | Tucker #1036 was sold at RM Sotheby's Auction in Monterey on August 15, 2014, for $1,567,500. | | | | | | |
| 1037 | Geyserville, California | Intact | Privately owned by Francis Ford Coppola | Franklin O-335 | Tucker Y-1 | Rubber Torsion Tube 2 | Maroon/200 |
| 1037 | On public display in the wine tasting room at the Francis Ford Coppola Winery in Geyserville, California. | | | | | | |
| 1038 | United Arab Emirates | Intact | Privately owned | Franklin O-335 | Cord 810/812 | Rubber Torsion Tube 2 | Green/300 |
| 1038 | Tucker #1038 was owned by Bernard Glieberman. It was on display in Shreveport, Louisiana, while Glieberman owned the Shreveport Pirates. In 1995, creditors moved to seize the car due to Glieberman's financial problems, and Glieberman's lawyer attempted to steal the car and hide it from authorities, only to run out of gas. Glieberman was eventually allowed to keep the car. The car was sold at auction in August 2006 for $577,500 ($525,000 plus fees) and sold again in August 2008 for $1,017,500 ($925,000 plus fees). | | | | | | |
| 1039 | Washington, DC | Intact | Smithsonian Institution | Franklin O-335 | Tucker Y-1 | Rubber Torsion Tube 2 | Grey(Silver)/500 |
| 1039 | After years in Smithsonian storage, Tucker #1039 was placed on public display in the National Museum of American History in 2011. Tucker #1039 was acquired by the Smithsonian through the U.S. Marshals Service which had previously seized the car in a 1992 narcotics arrest. Instead of selling the car, the U.S. Marshals Service decided to donate the car to the Smithsonian. Currently on display as of May 2022. | | | | | | |
| 1040 | Colorado | Intact | Stephen Tebo | Franklin O-335 | Tucker Y-1 | Rubber Torsion Tube 2 | Beige/400 |
| 1040 | Tucker #1040 was owned by the Nethercutt Collection. It was auctioned by Sotheby's on January 18, 2019, going for $1.6 million. | | | | | | |
| 1041 | California | Intact | Privately owned | Franklin O-335 | Cord 810/812 | Rubber Torsion Tube 2 | Black/100 |
| 1041 | Tucker #1041 was sold at the Clars Auction on June 7, 2009 for $750,000 ($765,000 with fees). | | | | | | |
| 1042 | Memphis, Tennessee | Destroyed | Privately owned | Franklin O-335 | Tuckermatic R-1-2 | Rubber Torsion Tube 2 | Maroon/600 |
| 1042 | Tucker #1042 was sold at the Tucker auction without an engine. Rumors exist that it was used in a "Bash a Tucker" fundraiser in the 1950s or may have been hauled off from its storage location by a disgruntled renter. Its location was unknown until 1960 when it was reportedly found abandoned and destroyed along the banks of the Mississippi River in Memphis. A Memphis policeman took possession of the remains, but they were later stolen from his property. Most of the Tuckermatic transmission was found and is currently located at the AACA Museum in Hershey, Pennsylvania. | | | | | | |
| 1043 | Salem, Oregon | Intact | Brothers Collection | Franklin O-335 | Unknown | Rubber Torsion Tube 2 | Waltz Blue/200 |
| 1043 | Tucker #1043 was sold at the Barrett-Jackson Auction in Scottsdale, Arizona, on January 21, 2012, for $2,915,000, presumably the highest sale of a Tucker 48 sedan to date. | | | | | | |
| 1044 | Roslyn, New York | Intact | Privately owned by Howard Kroplick | Franklin O-335 | Cord 810/812 | Rubber Torsion Tube 2 | Green/300 |
| 1044 | Tucker #1044 was sold at RM Sotheby's Auction in Arizona on January 19, 2017, for $1,347,500 to Howard Kroplick. The car, which had been painted a Root Beer Brown, was restored to its original color in 2018. | | | | | | |
| 1045 | Melbourne, Australia | Intact | Privately owned | Franklin O-335 | Tucker Y-1 | Rubber Torsion Tube 2 | Grey(Silver)/500 |
| 1045 | Tucker #1045 was sold at RM Auctions Sports & Classics of Monterey on August 13, 2010, for $1,127,500. | | | | | | |
| 1046 | California | Intact | Privately owned | Franklin O-335 (original) / Oldsmobile Rocket 88 / Mercury 390CID | Cord | Rubber Torsion Tube 2 (original)/Removed for front engine conversion | Maroon/600 |
| 1046 | Tucker #1046 was converted to a front-engine Oldsmobile drivetrain in the 1950s by Nick Jenin for his daughter. In 1963 it was sold to a Mercury dealer in Oregon and converted to a 1964 Mercury Monterey chassis with 390 CID front engine. Sold on eBay for $202,700 (8/20/07) and reportedly returned to original specifications, including a correct Tucker engine. In 2017 it was offered for sale for $2.1 million. | | | | | | |
| 1047 | Hickory Corners, Michigan | Intact | Gilmore Car Museum | Franklin O-335 | Cord 810/812 | Rubber Torsion Tube 2 | Waltz Blue/200 |
| 1048 | Hartford, Wisconsin | Intact | Privately owned | Franklin O-335 | Borg-Warner 3-speed automatic (original) None (last known) | Rubber Torsion Tube 2 | Green/300 |
| 1048 | Originally with a Borg-Warner 3 speed automatic, Tucker #1048 was sold at the factory auction without a transmission installed. A Tucker Y-1 may have been installed when the car was completed privately. | | | | | | |
| 1049 | California | Intact | Privately owned | Franklin O-335 | Tucker Y-1 | Rubber Torsion Tube 2 | Waltz Blue/200 |
| 1049 | Tucker #1049 was sold at RM Sotheby's Auction in Monaco on May 14, 2016, for €1,344,000 (approximately $1,519,850 USD). | | | | | | |
| 1050 | Michigan | Intact | Privately Owned | Franklin O-335 | Cord 810/812 | Rubber Torsion Tube 2 | Maroon/600 |
| 1050 | Tucker #1050 is the lowest mileage Tucker in existence, with 0.4 miles on the odometer. | | | | | | |

Incomplete Tucker 48s #1051-1058 Completed after leaving the factory or parted out
| Chassis Number | Location | Status | Owner | Engine | Transmission | Front Suspension Version | Original Body Color/Paint Code |
|---|---|---|---|---|---|---|---|
| 1051 | Moragnville, NJ | Intact | Privately owned by Rob Ida and the Tucker family | Franklin O-335 | Unknown | Unknown | Dark red |
| 1051 | Tucker #1051 was not completed at the Tucker factory, so it is not technically considered one of the original 51 cars. #1051 was purchased at the factory auction in an incomplete state, and was finished in the late 1980s using leftover Tucker parts and fiberglass replica doors. The chassis used to complete #1051 is actually from Tucker #1054. Tucker #1051 was purchased in April 2025 | | | | | | |
| 1052 | Aurora, Indiana | Intact | Privately owned | Franklin O-335 | Tucker Y-1 | Unknown | Dark red |
| 1052 | Tucker #1052 was not completed at the Tucker factory, so it is also not technically considered one of the original 51 cars. Tucker #1052 was a test chassis used at the factory for testing automatic transmission designs. The car consisted of only the chassis, driveline, suspension, dashboard, and seats. The car was completed in 2015 by Tucker enthusiast John Schuler using parts he collected over many years, along with front sheetmetal sourced from Tucker #1018. Reproduction floor pans, roof and rear doors were used. Schuler donated the car to Mayo Clinic to be sold at auction in August 2019. It sold for $900,000. | | | | | | |
| 1053 | Unknown | Unknown | Unknown | Unknown | Unknown | Unknown | Unknown |
| 1054 | Unknown | Unknown | Unknown | Unknown | Unknown | Unknown | Unknown |
| 1054 | The chassis of Tucker #1054 was used to complete Tucker #1051. | | | | | | |
| 1055 | Unknown | Unknown | Unknown | Unknown | Unknown | Unknown | Unknown |
| 1056 | Unknown | Unknown | Unknown | Unknown | Unknown | Unknown | Unknown |
| 1057 | Rowlett, Texas | Intact | Privately owned by Accelerate Auto Group | Franklin O-335 | Cord 610/812 | Unknown | Waltz Blue/200 |
| 1057 | Tucker #1057 was the prototype being worked on by Tucker designer Alex Tremulis for the 1949 model year and may be the only 1949 model still in existence. #1057 was one of eight incomplete body shells (believed to be #1051–1058) left on the assembly line at the time the Tucker plant was closed. Photos from the factory show #1057 was being built with a "wrap around rear window" as one of the 1949 year design changes. #1057 was eventually converted into a convertible, completed in 2010, and, as of 2021, is up for auction in Rowlett, Texas for a starting bid of $2,595,000. | | | | | | |
| 1058 | Unknown | Unknown | Unknown | Unknown | Unknown | Unknown | Unknown |

== Replica vehicles ==
In 1997, Rob Ida Automotive started work on a replica of the Tucker 48, which culminated in the release and marketing of the 2001 Ida Automotive New Tucker 48. This replica faithfully recreates the Tucker's external bodywork, but is built on a hotrod chassis with resin-infused plastic body panels. The paint and wheels reflect modern hotrod styling, and the interior is fully modernized. It is powered by a mid-mounted Cadillac Northstar V8. Its claimed performance is 0–60 in 7 seconds, with a top speed in excess of 120 mph (190 km/h). Ida has built three Tucker replicas.

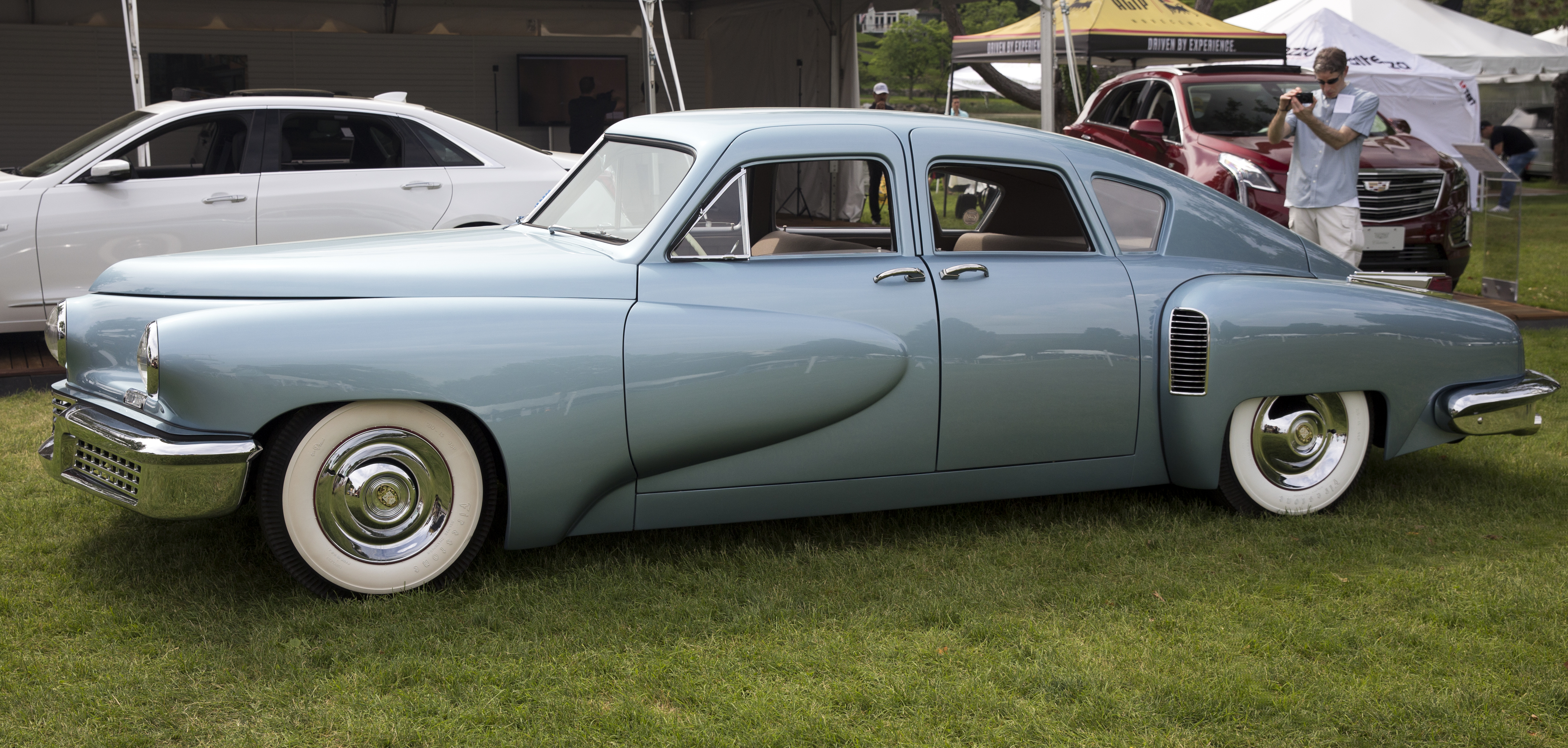
Side view of the Ida Automotive New Tucker (twin turbo model)

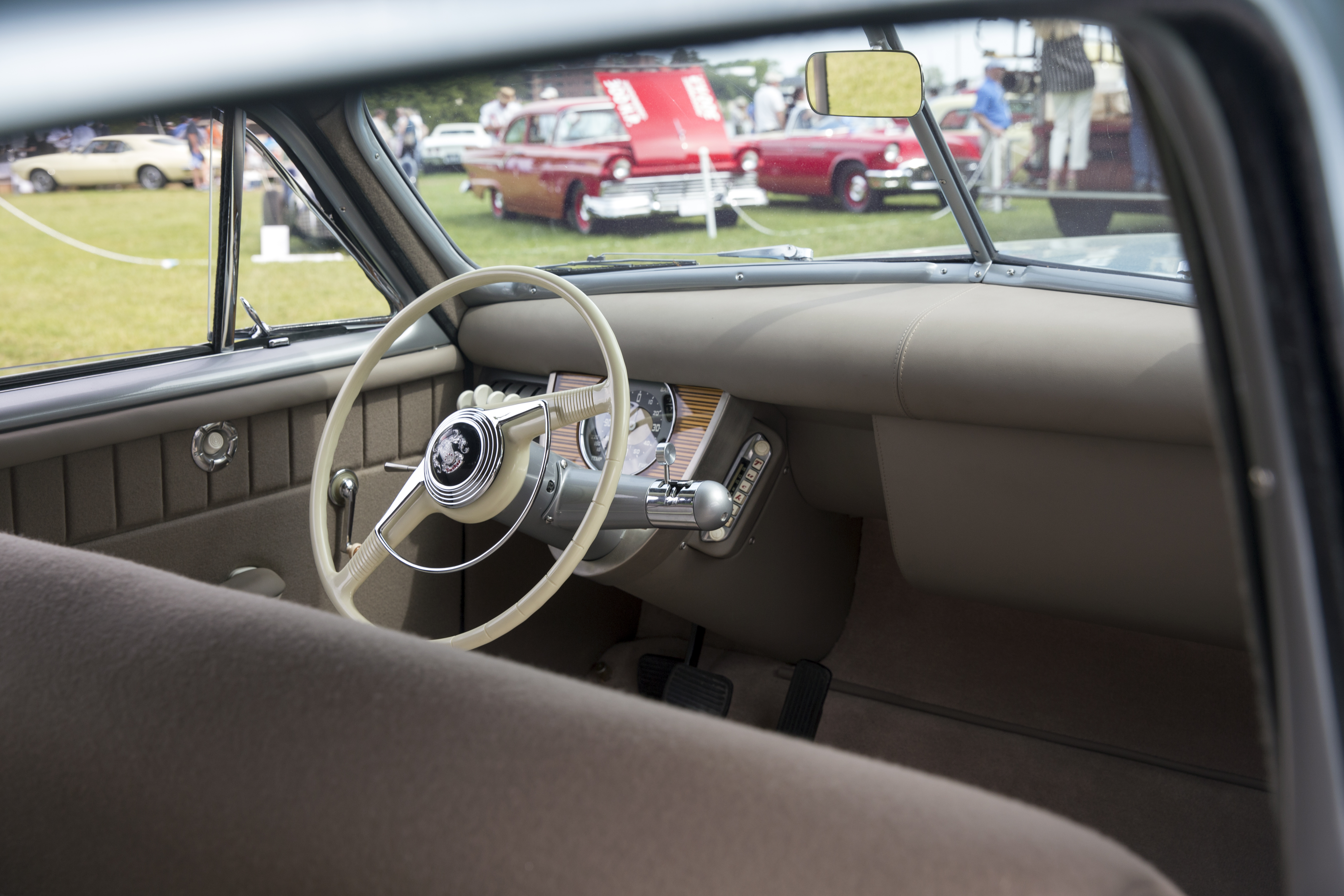
Interior of the Ida Automotive New Tucker

== NASCAR ==
Tucker #1004 was briefly raced in the NASCAR Grand National series in the early 1950s.

== See also ==
- List of defunct United States automobile manufacturers
