= Franklin O-335 =

Aircraft piston engine

O-335/6A/6V
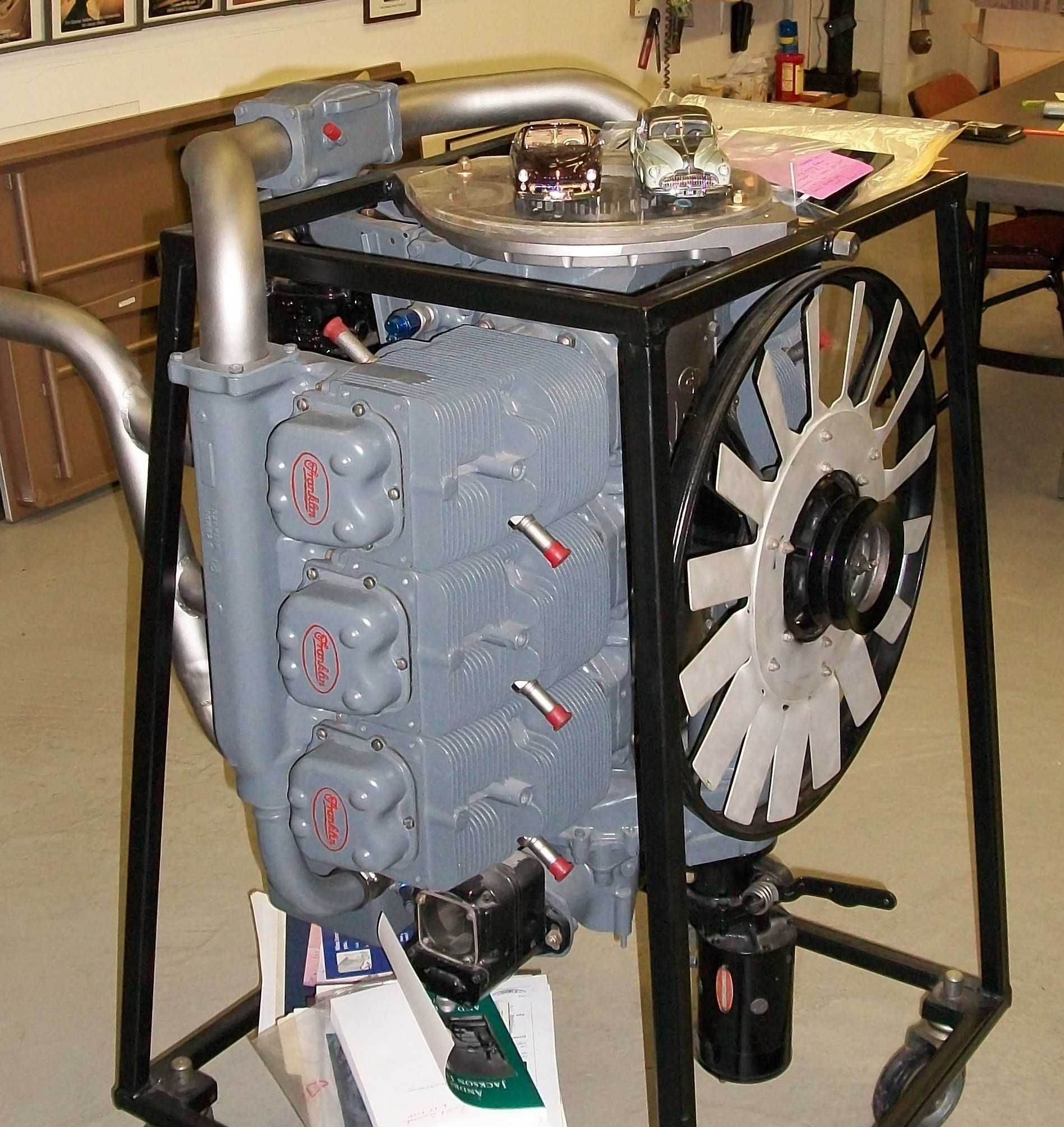
- Type: Flat-6
- National origin: United States
- Manufacturer: Franklin Engine Company
- Major applications: Bell 47, Hiller OH-23 Raven

The Franklin O-335 (company designations variations on 6A and 6V) was an American air-cooled aircraft engine of the 1940s. The engine was of six-cylinder, horizontally-opposed layout and displaced 335 cu in (5.5 L). The power output of later variants was 225 hp (168 kW).

== Design and development ==
These engines were commonly vertically mounted and used to power many early helicopters in the United States. They were closely related to the 2A4 and 4A4 2- and 4-cylinder engines. In various subtypes, the 6A4 remained in continuous production from 1945 to the time Franklin's United States operations ceased in 1975, with versions continuing in Polish production into the 1990s.

In 1947 this engine was modified into a water-cooled version by the Tucker Car Corporation for use in the 1948 Tucker Sedan. Tucker liked the engine so much that he purchased the Aircooled Motors/Franklin Engine Company, and it remained under the ownership of the Tucker family until 1961.

== Variants ==
O-335-1
Military designation of vertical installation model for helicopters :175 hp (130 kW)
O-335-3
Similar to -1 but changes in starter installation
O-335-5
200 hp (149 kW)
O-335-5B
200 hp (149 kW)
6A-335
180 hp (134 kW) at 2,800 rpm
6AL-335
150 hp (112 kW) at 2,600 rpm
6A4-125
125 hp (93 kW) at 2,200 rpm
6A4-130
130 hp (97 kW) at 2,200 rpm
6A4-135
135 hp (101 kW) at 2,450 rpm
6A4-140
140 hp (104 kW) at 2,375 rpm
6A4-145
145 hp (108 kW) at 2,600 rpm
6A4-150
150 hp (112 kW) at 2,600 rpm
6A4-165
165 hp (123 kW) at 2,800 rpm
6A4-200
200 hp (149 kW) at 3,100 rpm
6AG-335
220 hp (164 kW) at 3,400 rpm
6AG4-185
185 hp (138 kW) at 3,100 rpm
6AGS-335
260 hp (194 kW) at 3,400 rpm
6AS-335
240 hp (179 kW) at 3,200 rpm
6V-335-B
210 hp (157 kW) at 3,100 rpm
6V-335-A1A
200 hp (149 kW) at 3,100 rpm
6V-335-A1B
200 hp (149 kW) at 3,100 rpm
6V4-165
165 hp (123 kW)
6V4-178-B32
178 hp (133 kW) at 3,000 rpm
6V4-200-C32
200 hp (149 kW) at 3,100 rpm
6VS-O-335
225 hp (168 kW) at 3,200 rpm

== Applications ==
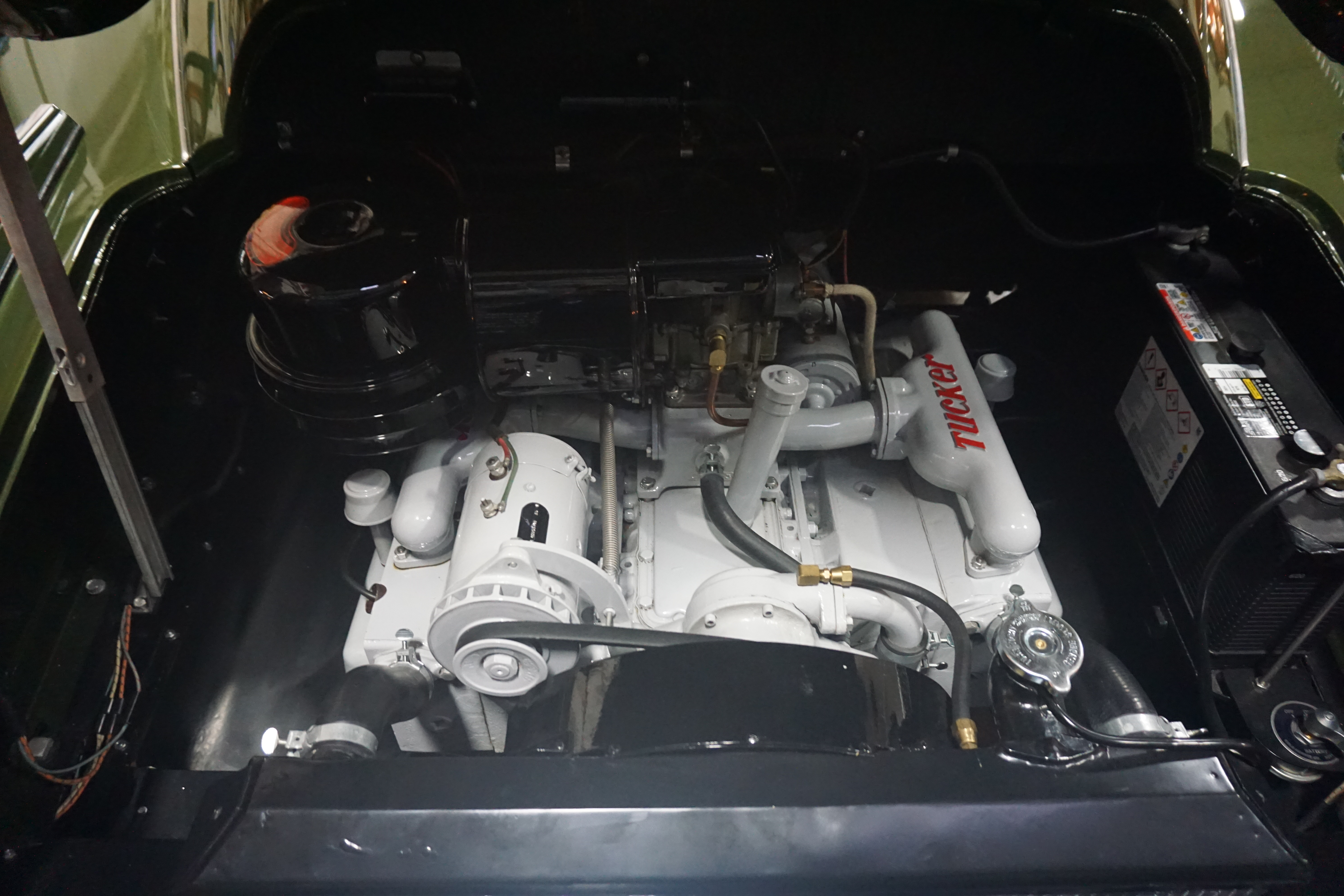
A Franklin O-335 in a Tucker 48 at Stahls Automotive Collection

- Aero-Flight Streak
- Aeronca Sedan
- Bartlett Zephyr
- Bell 47
- Bell H-13 Sioux
- Bellanca Cruisair
- Brantly B-1
- Goodyear Duck
- Hiller H-23 Raven
- Hiller 360
- Hirth Acrostar
- HTM Skytrac
- Maule M-5-220C Lunar Rocket
- Republic RC-3 Seabee
- Seibel S-4
- Sikorsky S-52
- Socata MS.894 Rallye Minerva
- Stinson Voyager
- Sznycer SG-VI
- Taylorcraft 15
- Temco TE-1B
- Tucker (automobile)
- Temco YT-35 Buckaroo

== Specifications (6AL-335 / 6A4-150-B3) ==
Franklin O-335/6AC Engine.

Data from Wilkinson

=== General characteristics ===
- Type: 6-cylinder air-cooled horizontally opposed direct drive supercharged aircraft piston engine
- Bore: 4.5 in (114.3 mm)
- Stroke: 3.5 in (88.9 mm)
- Displacement: 335 cu in (5.49 L)
- Length: 37.4 in (950 mm)
- Width: 30.8 in (780 mm)
- Height: 21.6 in (550 mm)
- Dry weight: 307 lb (139 kg)

=== Components ===
- Valvetrain: OHV, 1 x inlet valve, 1 x exhaust valve operated by pushrods
- Supercharger: Mechanically driven supercharger
- Fuel system: 1x Marvel-Schebler MA-3SPA updraught carburettor
- Fuel type: 80 Octane gasoline
- Oil system: 80 S.U. secs (15.6 cSt) grade pressure fed at 40 psi (3 bar), wet sump
- Cooling system: Air-cooled
- Delco-Remy direct cranking electric starter motor

=== Performance ===
- Power output:
- (Take-off): 150 hp (110 kW) at 2,600 rpm
- (Normal): 150 hp (110 kW) at 2,600 rpm at sea level
- (Cruising): 112 hp (84 kW) at 2,350 rpm at sea level
- Specific power: 0.45 hp/(cu in) (20.35 kW/L)
- Compression ratio: 7:1
- Specific fuel consumption: 0.51 lb/(hp h) (0.311 kg/(kW h) cruising, 4.5 US gal/(hp h)) cruising
- Oil consumption: 0.01 lb/(hp h) (0.006 kg/(kW h)
- Power-to-weight ratio: 0.488 hp/lb (0.8 kW/kg)
- B.m.e.p.: 137 psi (945 kPa)

== See also ==
Comparable engines

- Lycoming O-435

Related lists

- List of aircraft engines
