= John Wilkinson (Franklin automobile) =

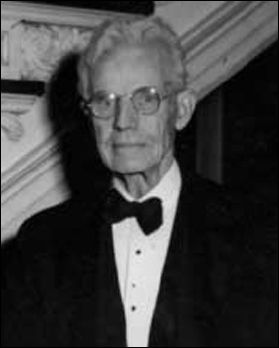
- John Wilkinson in 1947
- Born: February 11, 1868; Syracuse, New York, United States
- Died: June 25, 1951 (aged 83); Syracuse, New York, United States
- Education: Cornell University
- Occupations: Mechanical engineer, inventor, business
- Spouse: Edith Belden (Known as DeeDee)
- Children: Helen Wilkinson Blagbrough (1897–1947), Anne Belden Wilkinson Sherry (1899–1997), John Belden Wilkinson (1905–1951)
- Parent(s): Joshua Forman Wilkinson (1829–1889); Louisa B. Rayner

John Wilkinson (February 11, 1868 – June 25, 1951) was an American mechanical engineer, inventor, and businessman. He invented the air-cooled motor which was used in the Franklin (automobile) produced by H. H. Franklin Manufacturing Company, where he was chief engineer and designer from 1902 to 1924.

He was born in Syracuse, New York, to recognition, respect, and wealth. His grandfather, John Wilkinson, Sr. (1798–1862), was one of the original pioneers of Upstate, New York. As a young man, Wilkinson, Sr. was a city planner and named the newly incorporated village after Classical Syracuse.
