= Vertical Hummingbird =

American helicopter

Hummingbird
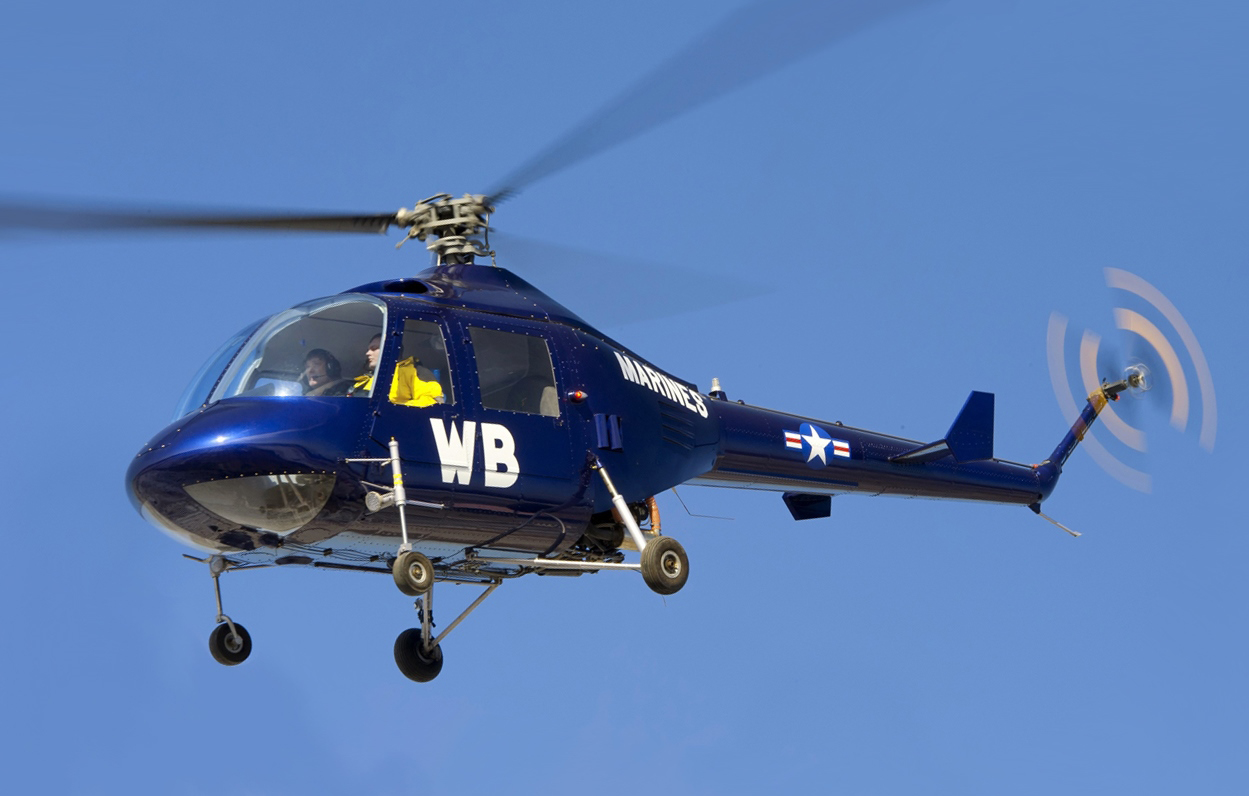

General information
- Type: Helicopter
- National origin: United States
- Manufacturer: Vertical Aviation Technologies
- Status: In production (2013)

History
- Introduction date: 1991
- Developed from: Sikorsky S-52

The Vertical Hummingbird is an American helicopter, produced by Vertical Aviation Technologies of Sanford, Florida that was introduced in 1991. The aircraft is supplied as a kit for amateur construction.

== Design and development ==
The Hummingbird is a development of the certified Sikorsky S-52 that first flew in 1947, adapted to kit form. The aircraft features a single main rotor, a four-seat enclosed cabin, quadracycle landing gear and an option for skids. The prototype was converted by Vertical Aviation Technologies from a Sikorsky S-52-3.

The Hummingbird fuselage is made from riveted aluminum sheet. The nose section is adapted from the Bell 206. Its 33 ft (10.1 m) diameter fully articulated three-bladed main rotor employs a NACA 0015 airfoil. The two-bladed tail rotor has a diameter of 5.75 ft (1.8 m). The aircraft has an empty weight of 1,790 lb (812 kg) and a gross weight of 2,800 lb (1,270 kg), giving a useful load of 1,010 lb (458 kg). With full fuel of 57 U.S. gallons (220 L; 47 imp gal) the payload is 668 lb (303 kg).

== Variants ==
VAT S-52-3
Prototype of the Hummingbird family, converted from an original Sikorsky S-52-3.
Hummingbird 260L
Version powered by a six cylinder, air-cooled, four-stroke, dual-ignition 265 hp (198 kW) Lycoming IVO-435 engine
Hummingbird 300LS
Version powered by an eight cylinder, liquid-cooled, four-stroke, single-ignition 325 hp (242 kW) General Motors LS7 V-8 automotive conversion engine, derated to 280 hp (209 kW)
Hummingbird 300L
Version powered by a six cylinder, air-cooled, fuel injected Lycoming IO-540 derated to 280 hp (209 kW)

== Specifications (Hummingbird 300L) ==
Data from Vertical Aviation

General characteristics

- Crew: one
- Capacity: three passengers
- Width: 5 ft 0 in (1.52 m)
- Height: 8 ft 7 in (2.62 m)
- Airfoil: NACA 0015
- Empty weight: 1,790 lb (812 kg)
- Gross weight: 2,800 lb (1,270 kg)
- Fuel capacity: 57 US gallons (47 imp gal; 220 L)
- Powerplant: 1 × Lycoming IO-540 six cylinder, air-cooled, four stroke fuel injected aircraft engine, 280 hp (210 kW)
- Main rotor diameter: 33 ft 0 in (10.06 m)

Performance

- Maximum speed: 110 mph (180 km/h, 96 kn)
- Never exceed speed: 110 mph (180 km/h, 96 kn)
- Range: 380 mi (610 km, 330 nmi)
- Service ceiling: 14,000 ft (4,300 m)
- Rate of climb: 950 ft/min (4.8 m/s) at 2,800 lb (1,270 kg)
