= Franklin (automobile) =

American manufacturer of automobiles

Franklin Automobile Company

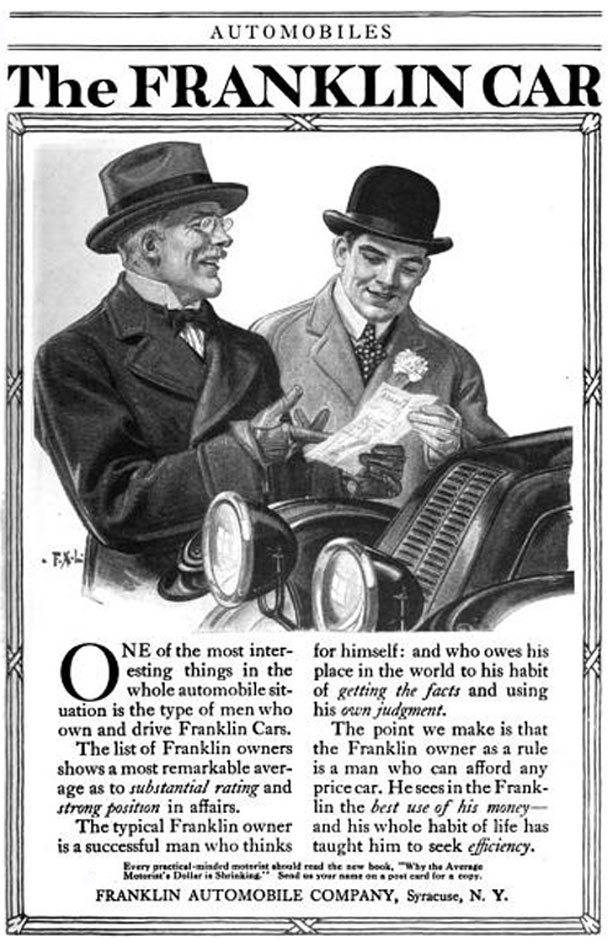
- Advertisement 1916
- Industry: Automotive
- Genre: Sedans, touring cars, limousines, coupes, speedsters, taxis, light trucks
- Founded: 1906 (1902, first car produced)
- Founder: Herbert H. Franklin
- Defunct: 1934
- Fate: Bankruptcy
- Headquarters: Syracuse, New York, United States
- Area served: United States
- Key people: John Wilkinson, chief engineer
- Products: Automobiles; Automotive parts
- Owner: Herbert H. Franklin
- Number of employees: 3,210 in 1920
- Parent: H. H. Franklin Manufacturing Company

The Franklin Automobile Company was an American automobile manufacturer between 1902 and 1934 in Syracuse, New York. Herbert H. Franklin, the founder, began his career in the metal die casting business before establishing his automobile enterprise. Controlled by Herbert H. Franklin it had very few other significant shareholders. Franklin bought its vehicles from the H. H. Franklin Manufacturing Company which was only moderately profitable and frequently missed dividends on common stock.

The two major characteristics of their automobiles were their air-cooled engines and in the early years their lightness and responsiveness when compared with other luxury cars.

The Franklin companies suffered financial collapse in April 1934. Aside from his consequent retirement CEO Herbert Franklin's lifestyle was unaffected.

== History ==
=== Innovations ===
All Franklin cars were air-cooled, which the company considered simpler and more reliable than water cooling, and the company considered light weight to be critical in making a well-performing car given the limited power of the engines then available. Most Franklins were wood-framed, though the very first used an angle iron frame (1902) and, beginning in 1928, the heavier cars adopted a conventional pressed-steel frame. Lightweight aluminum was used in quantity, to the extent that Franklin was reckoned to be the largest user of aluminum in the world in the early years of the company.

=== Production ===
Offerings for 1904 included a touring car model with a detachable rear tonneau and which seated four passengers. The transverse-mounted, vertical straight-four engine, producing 10 hp (7.5 kW), was mounted at the front of the car. A two-speed planetary transmission was fitted. The car weighed 1100 lb (499 kg). List price was US$1300. By contrast, the Ford Model F in 1905 was priced at $1,000, the FAL was US$1750, a Cole 30 or Colt Runabout was US$1500, the Ford Model S $700, the high-volume Oldsmobile Runabout US$650, Western's Gale Model A US$500, the Black could be as low as $375, and the Success hit the amazingly low US$250.

Franklin cars were technological leaders, first with six cylinders (by 1905) and automatic spark advance, in 1907. Demonstrating reliability, L. L. Whitman drove a Franklin from New York City to San Francisco in 1906 in 15 days 2 hours 15 minutes, a new record. Franklin was the undisputed leader in air-cooled cars at a time when virtually every other manufacturer had adopted water cooling as cheaper and easier to manufacture. Before the invention of antifreeze, the air-cooled car had a huge advantage in cold weather, and Franklins were popular among people such as doctors, who needed an all-weather machine. The limitation of air-cooling was the size of the cylinder bore and the available area for the valves, which limited the power output of the earlier Franklins. By 1921, a change in cooling—moving the fan from sucking hot air to blowing cool air—led the way to the gradual increase in power.

Franklins were often rather odd-looking cars, although some were distinctly handsome with Renault-style hoods. Starting in 1925, at the demand of dealers, Franklins were redesigned to look like conventional cars sporting a massive nickel-plated "dummy radiator" which served as an air intake and was called a "hoodfront". This design by J. Frank DeCausse enabled the Franklin to employ conventional styling. The same year, Franklin introduced the boat-tail to car design.

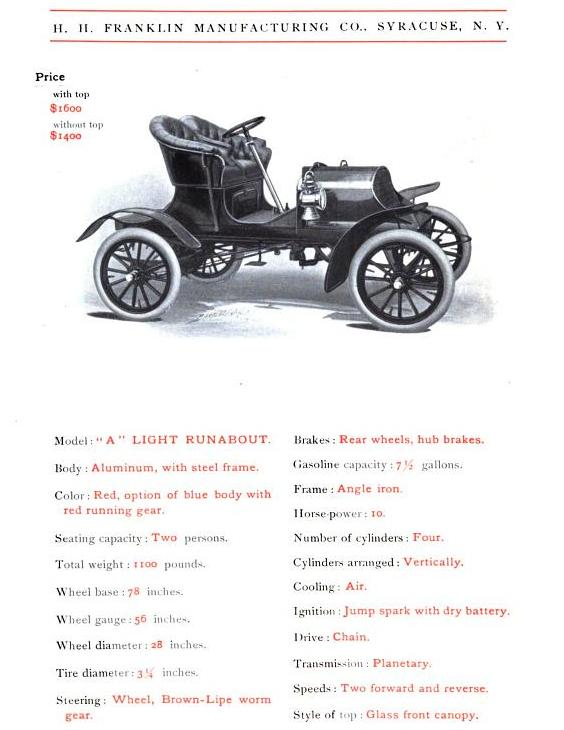
1905 Franklin Model A Light Runabout

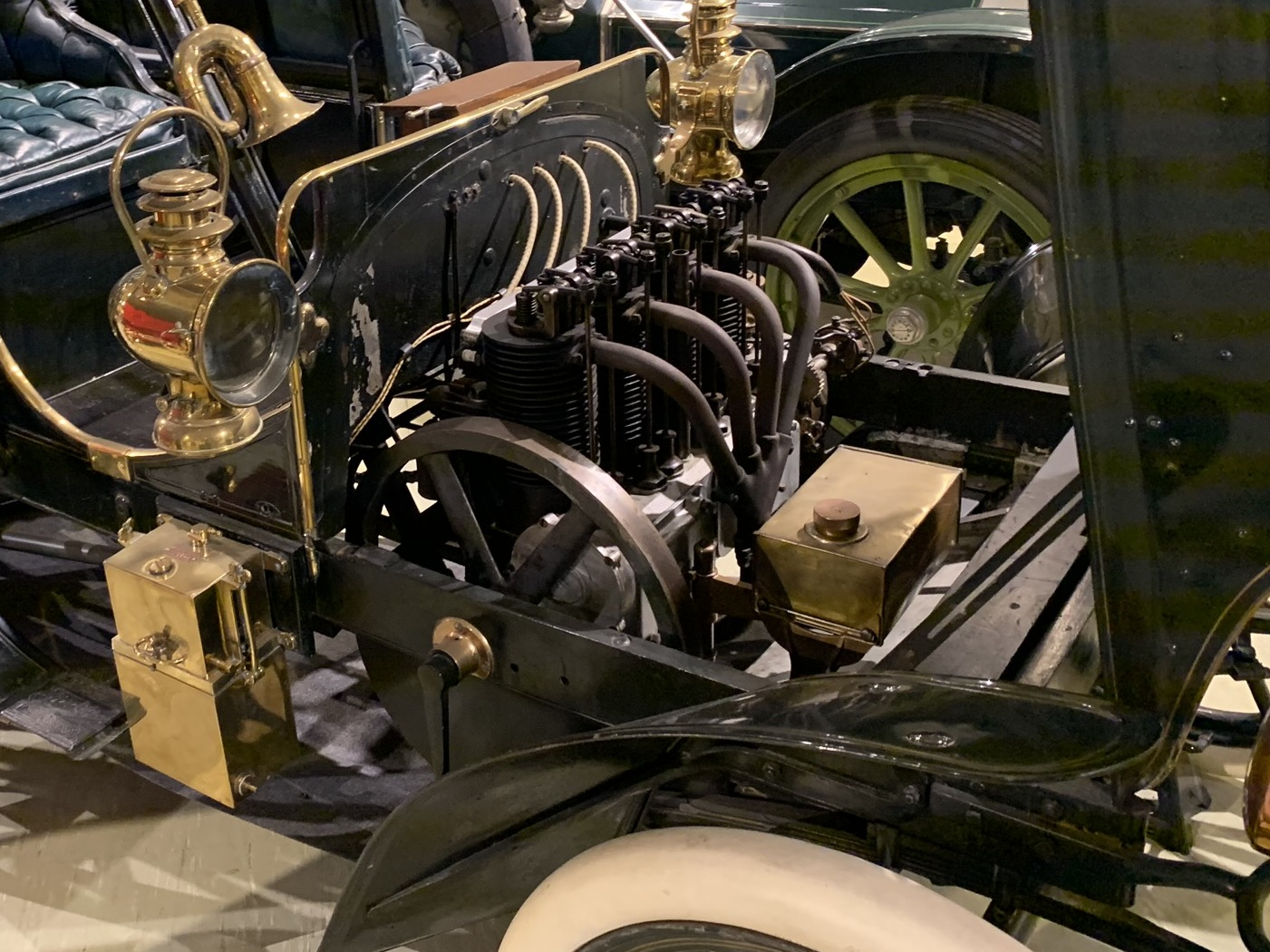
1905 Franklin engine details unknown

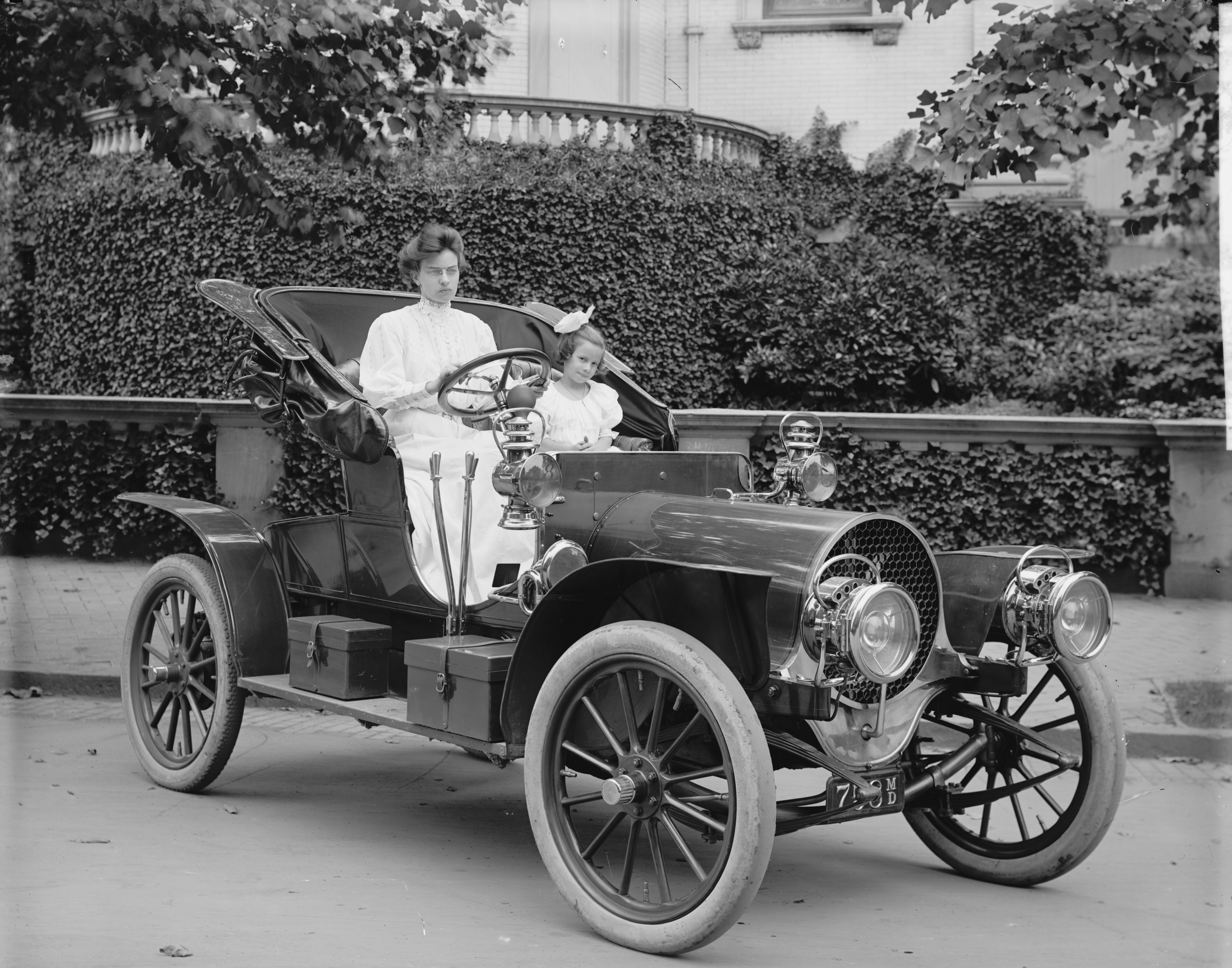
Franklin Model D Roadster 1907

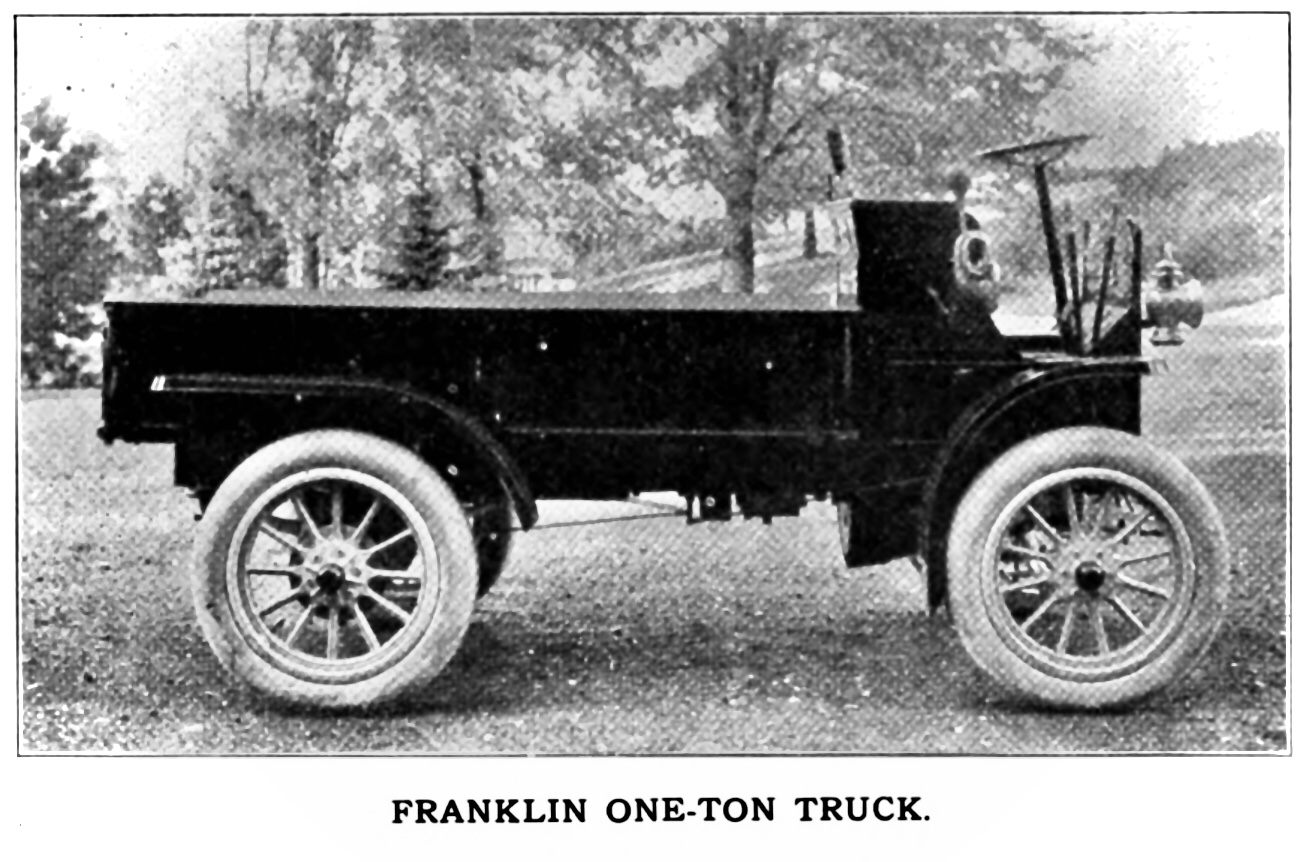
Franklin One Ton Truck (1911)

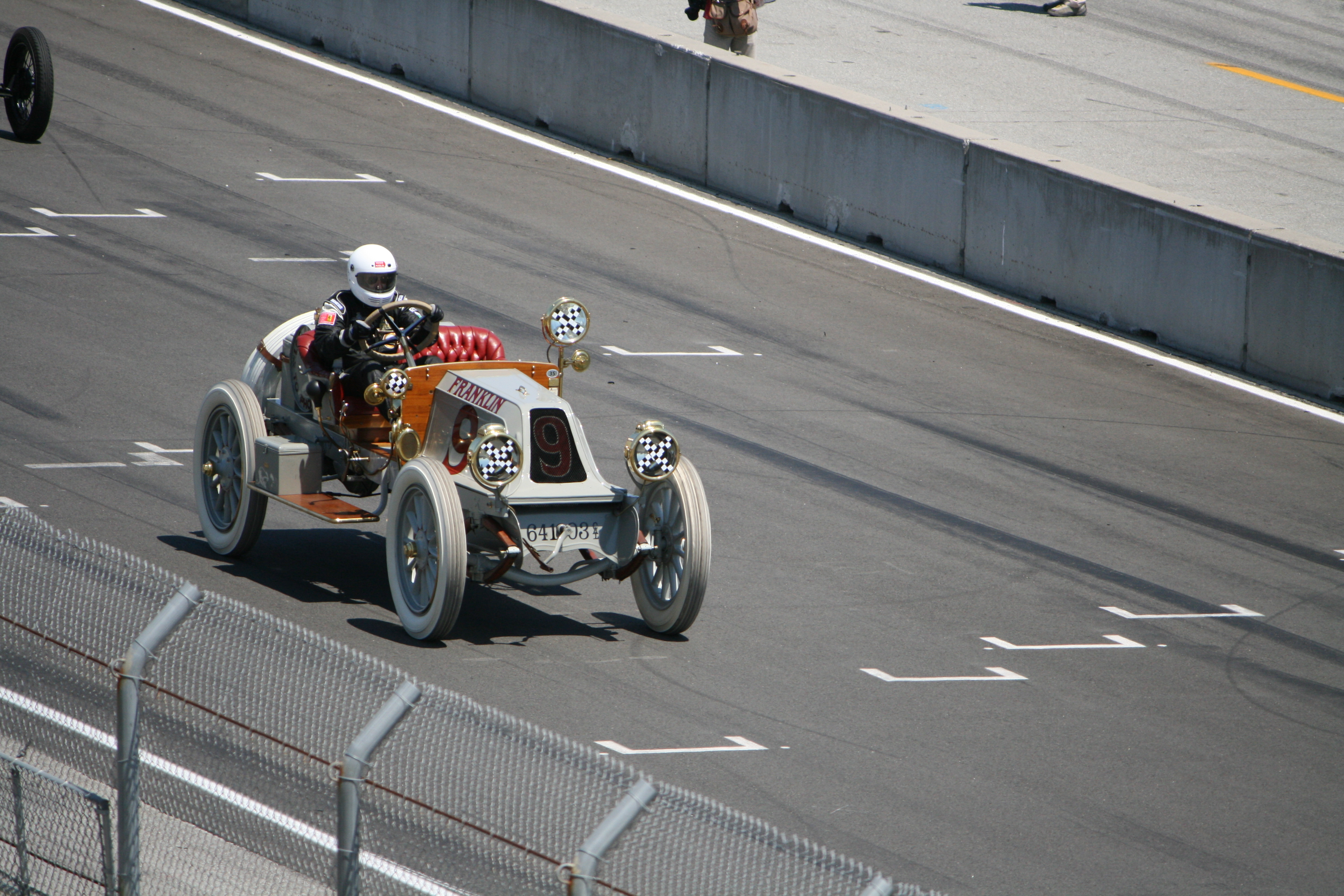
1912 Franklin Torpedo Phaeton at Monterey Historic Automobile Races 2008.

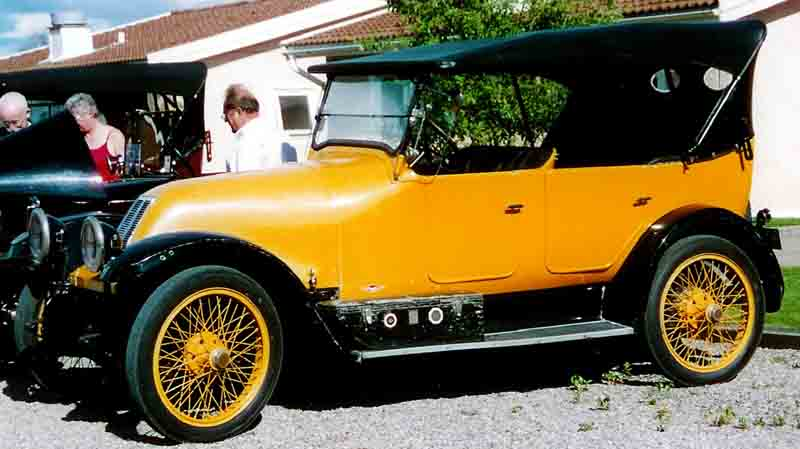
Franklin Model 9-B Touring 1919

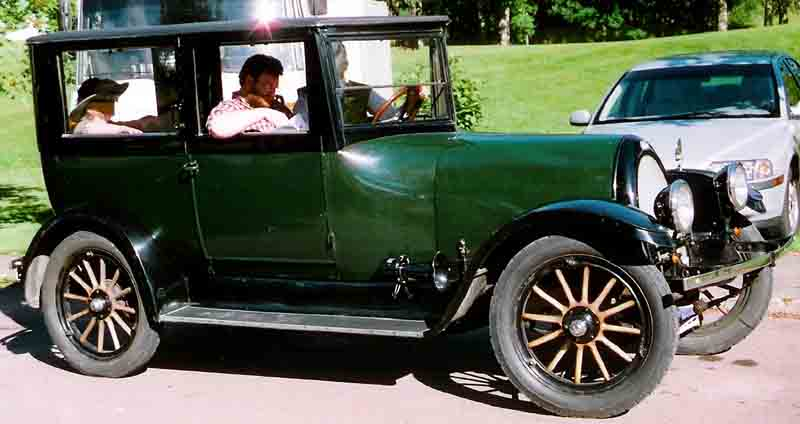
Franklin Model 9-B Sedan 1922

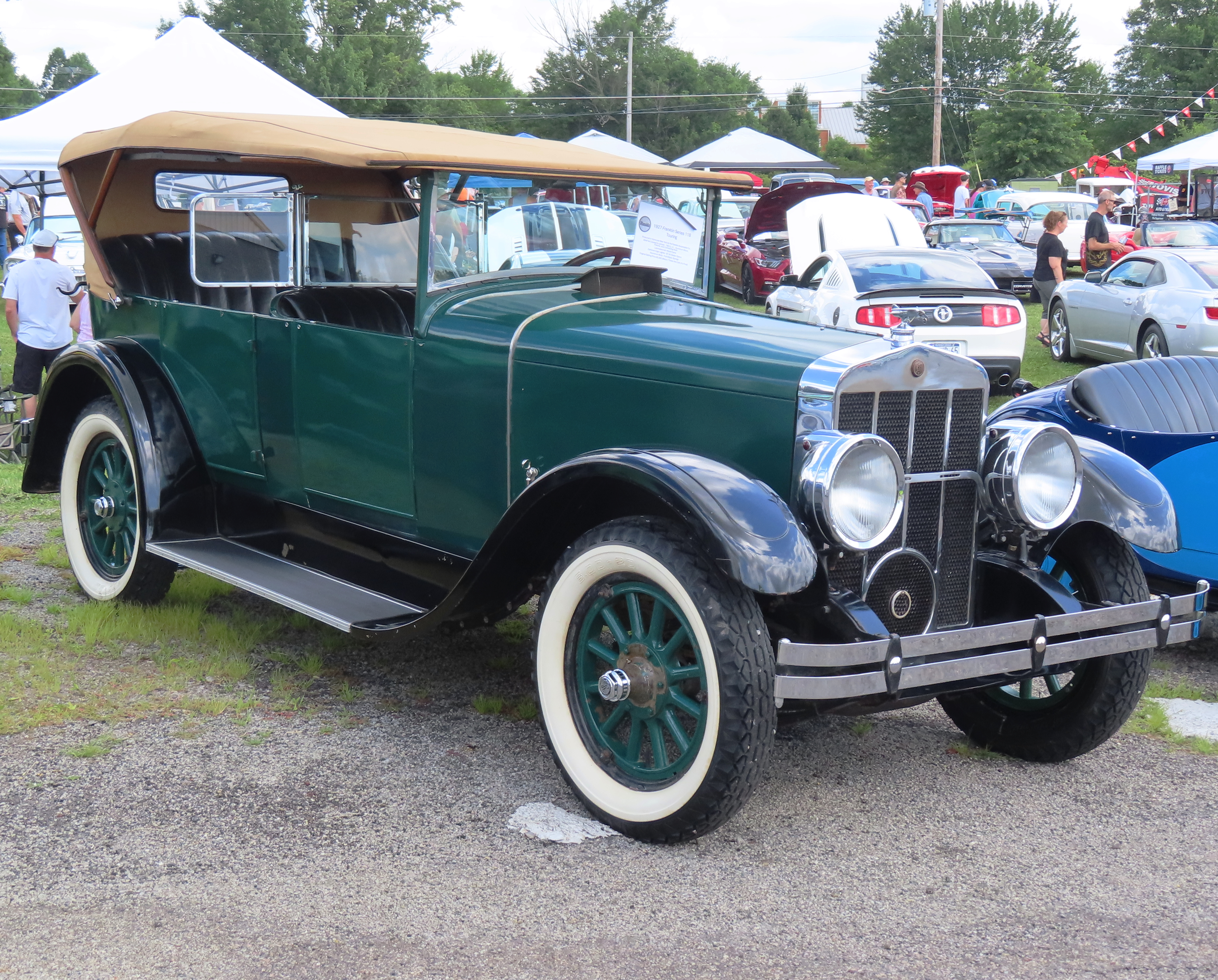
1927 Franklin Model 11-B Touring

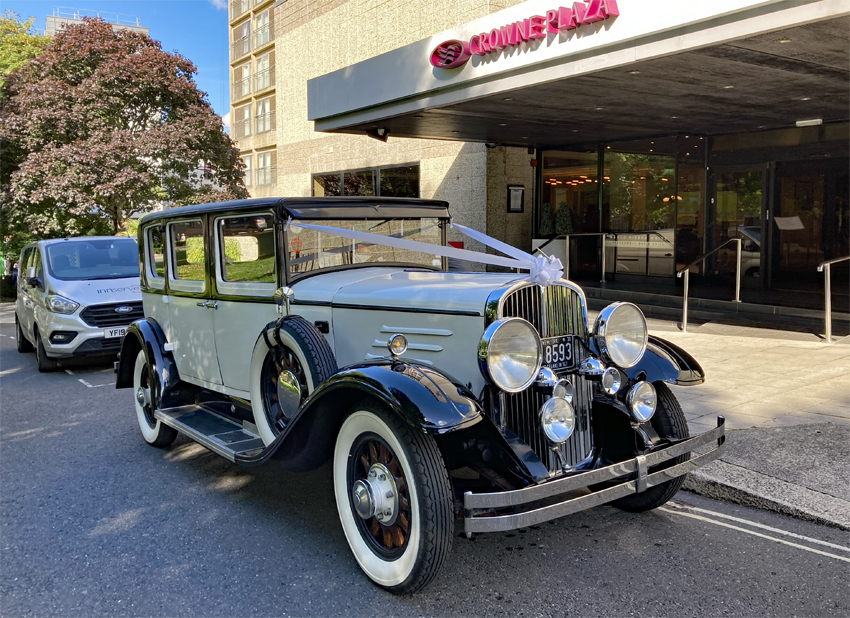
Franklin 147 1930

In 1930 Franklin introduced a new type of engine which ultimately produced 100 horsepower (75 kW), with one of the highest power-to-weight ratios of the time. In 1932, in response to competition amongst luxury car makers, Franklin brought out a twelve-cylinder engine. Air cooled with 398 cubic inches (6.5 L), it developed 150 hp (110 kW). It was designed to be installed in a lightweight chassis, but the car became a 6,000-pound (2,700 kg) behemoth when Franklin engineers were overruled by management sent in from banks to recover bad loans. Although attractive, the Twelve did not have the ride and handling characteristics of its forebears.

=== Demise ===
The Twelve was the wrong vehicle to be building after the crash of 1929 and the subsequent Great Depression. The cars sold poorly and failed to recover the company's investment. The company declared bankruptcy in 1934.

Car production did not survive, but the name and assets were sold. Production of air-cooled engines for commercial and aircraft use was continued by Aircooled Motors of Syracuse. This company was bought after World War II by Preston Tucker. The flat-six engines were fitted with water-cooling jackets and used in the short lived Tucker automobile. The company was sold again after Tucker was disbanded.

Franklin engines powered numerous light planes (owing to their light weight) as well as most early American-built helicopters. Aircooled Motors, the last company to manufacture air-cooled engines under the Franklin name, declared bankruptcy in 1975. Its designs were sold to the Polish government. Engines based on these designs remain in production.

In his book for the Society of Automotive Engineers Inc, The Franklin Automobile Company, Sinclair Powell gave the following reasons for the end of Franklin:

While the cars were ranked among the industry's top products and in some years more than half the sales were to previous Franklin owners on top of major economic forces there were difficulties from within the firm itself.

1. Profit per vehicle was enough to pay a proper dividend in only one year, 1925
2. Franklin held on to its "craft shop" approach whereas Packard and Cadillac moved on without any loss of quality
3. Franklin went on making many components when they might have been bought in at a much lower cost
4. Walker Body Company was chosen to supply aluminum bodies of high quality when (heavier) steel bodies were available at relatively low cost
5. Franklin dealers might be in insignificant locations and in any case did not occupy the imposing establishments of Packard and Cadillac dealers

Debt taken on to greatly expand production in 1929 produced extra cars saleable only for very large discounts. This discounting seriously weakened both Franklin and its dealerships even before the onset of the Great Depression. Similar discounting to move unsold stock was repeated in 1930 and again in 1931 and Franklin's position became hopeless. It struggled on until adjudged bankrupt in April 1934.

== Production models ==
- Franklin Type A
- Franklin Type B
- Franklin Type C
- Franklin Type D
- Franklin Type E
- Franklin Type F
- Franklin Type G
- Franklin Type H
- Franklin Type M
- Franklin Twelve
- Franklin Sedan

== See also ==
- Brass Era car
- Coyote
- List of defunct United States automobile manufacturers
