= Coyote (automobile) =

Defunct American motor vehicle manufacturer

The Coyote was an American automobile built in Redondo Beach, California, from 1909 until 1910. The car was a sporty two-seat roadster with a 50 hp straight-8 engine, which was claimed to reach 75 mph (121 km/h). Many parts, such as the axles and steering gear were from the Franklin Auto Company. Only two were ever made.
