= Franklin O-225 =

American-made aircraft engine

O-225/4A/4A4
- Type: Piston aircraft engine
- National origin: United States
- Manufacturer: Franklin Engine Company
- First run: 1945

The Franklin O-225 (company designation 4A/4A4) was an American air-cooled aircraft engine that first ran in the mid-1940s. The engine was of four-cylinder, horizontally-opposed layout and displaced 225 cu in (4 L). The power output was between 75 hp (56 kW) and 125 hp (93 kW) depending on the version.

== Variants ==
4A4-75
75 hp (56 kW) at 1,950 rpm

4A4-85
85 hp (63 kW) at 2,200 rpm

4A4-100
100 hp (75 kW) at 2,550 rpm

4A-225
100 hp (75 kW) at 2,800 rpm

== Applications ==
- Cessna 160
- Bendix 51
- Bendix 52
- Bendix 55
- Dansaire Coupe
- Eshelman Winglet
- Government Workshops Triciclo-Experimental

== Specifications (4A4-100) ==
Data from

=== General characteristics ===
- Type: 4-cylinder air-cooled horizontally opposed aircraft piston engine
- Bore: 4.5 in (114.3 mm)
- Stroke: 3.5 in (88.9 mm)
- Displacement: 222.7 in³ (3.65 L)
- Dry weight: 198 lb (90 kg)

=== Components ===
- Cooling system: Air-cooled

=== Performance ===
- Power output: 100 hp (75 kW) at 2,550 rpm

== See also ==
Comparable engines

- Lycoming O-235

Related lists

- List of aircraft engines
