= Franklin O-265 =

American air-cooled aircraft engine of the early 1940s

O-265/6AC-264
- Type: Piston aircraft engine
- National origin: United States
- Manufacturer: Franklin Engine Company
- First run: 1940

The Franklin O-265 (company designation 6AC-264) was an American air-cooled aircraft engine of the early 1940s. The engine was of six-cylinder, horizontally-opposed layout and displaced 265 cu in (4 L). The power output ranged between 120 hp (89 kW) and 140 hp (104 kW) depending on variant. The 6ACG-264 featured a geared propeller drive.

== Variants ==
6AC-264
110 hp (82 kW) at 2,600 rpm

6ACG-264
138 hp (103 kW) at 3,100 rpm

== Applications ==
- Bellanca Cruisair
- Northrop N-1M
- Vultee Stinson Model 75

== Specifications (6AC-264) ==
Data from

=== General characteristics ===
- Type: 6-cylinder air-cooled horizontally opposed aircraft piston engine
- Bore: 4.0 in (101.6 mm)
- Stroke: 3.5 in (88.9 mm)
- Displacement: 263.9 in³ (4.32 L)
- Dry weight: 248 lb (112 kg)

=== Components ===
- Cooling system: Air-cooled

=== Performance ===
- Power output: 120 hp (89 kW) at 2,600 rpm

== See also ==
Comparable engines

- Continental O-280

Related lists

- List of aircraft engines
