= Franklin O-400 =

American piston aircraft engine

O-400/8AC
- Type: Piston aircraft engine
- National origin: United States
- Manufacturer: Franklin Engine Company
- First run: 1941

The Franklin O-400 (company designation 8AC) was an American air-cooled aircraft engine of the 1940s. The engine was of eight-cylinder, horizontally-opposed layout and displaced 397 cu in (6.5 L). The power output was 235 hp (175 kW).

== Variants ==
8AC-398
200 hp (149 kW) at 2,600 rpm.
8ACG-398
235 hp (175 kW) at 3,500 rpm. The 8ACG-398 was unusual in using a reduction gearing for take-off and direct drive for cruising.

== Specifications (8ACG-398) ==
=== General characteristics ===
- Type: 8-cylinder air-cooled horizontally opposed aircraft piston engine
- Bore: 4.25 in (108.0 mm)
- Stroke: 3.5 in (88.9 mm)
- Displacement: 397.2 cu in (6,509 cc)

=== Components ===
- Valvetrain: OHV
- Cooling system: Air-cooled

=== Performance ===
- Power output: 235 hp (175.2 kW) at 2,600 rpm

== See also ==
Related lists

- List of aircraft engines
