= Franklin O-540 =

American air-cooled aircraft engine

O-540/8AC
- Type: Piston aircraft engine
- National origin: United States
- Manufacturer: Franklin Engine Company
- First run: 1942

The Franklin O-540 (company designation 8AC) was an American air-cooled aircraft engine that first ran in the early-1940s. The engine was of eight-cylinder, horizontally-opposed layout and displaced 540 cu in (9 L). The power output was nominally 300 hp (224 kW).

== Variants ==
8ACG-538 (XO-540-1)
Geared propeller drive at 0.632:1, 300 hp (224 kW) at 3,200 rpm

8ACSA-538 (XO-540-7)
Supercharged, 300 hp (224 kW)

8ACGSA-538 (XO-540-3/O-540-5)
Supercharged and geared,330 hp (246 kW) at 3,200 rpm

== Applications ==
- Northrop N-9M

== Specifications (8ACG-538/XO-540-1) ==
Data from

=== General characteristics ===
- Type: 8-cylinder air-cooled horizontally opposed aircraft piston engine
- Bore: 4.625 in (117.5 mm)
- Stroke: 4.0 in (101.6 mm)
- Displacement: 537.6 in³ (8.8 L)
- Dry weight: 438 lb (199 kg)

=== Components ===
- Cooling system: Air-cooled

=== Performance ===
- Power output: 300 hp (224 kW) at 3,200 rpm

== See also ==
Comparable engines

- Continental T8-450
- Lycoming O-540

Related lists

- List of aircraft engines
