= Doña Ana County International Jetport =

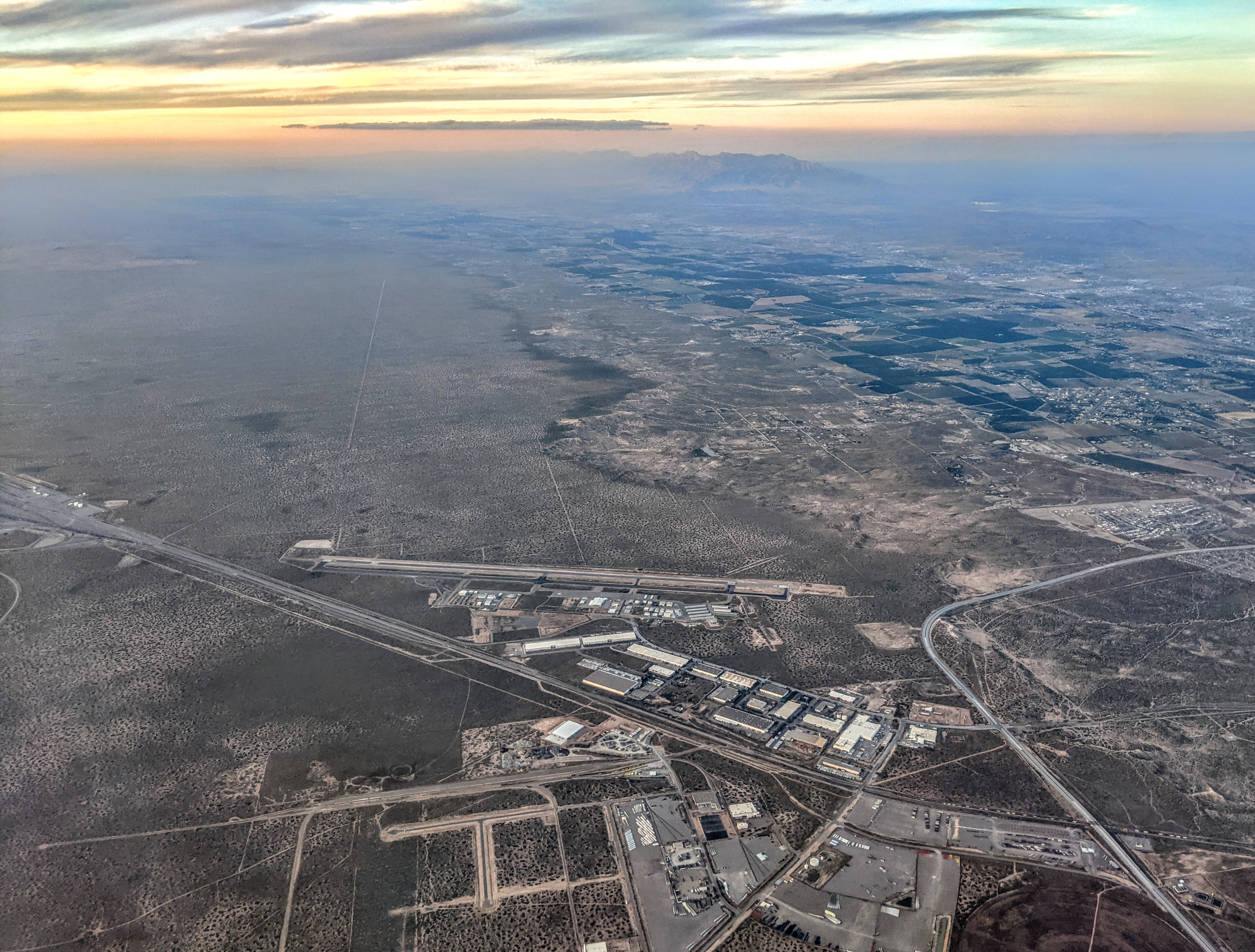
- The airport runway is visible at the center of this aerial view from the south.
- IATA: none; ICAO: KDNA; FAA LID: DNA

Summary
- Airport type: Public
- Owner/Operator: Doña Ana County
- Location: Santa Teresa, New Mexico
- Built: June 1968
- Elevation AMSL: 4,113 ft (1,254 m)
- Coordinates: 31°52′50″N 106°42′13″W

Map
- Location in New Mexico

Runways
Direction	Length		Surface
Direction	ft	m	Surface
10/28	9,550	2,911	Asphalt

Doña Ana County International Jetport (ICAO: KDNA, FAA LID: DNA) is a public-use airport located 4 mi (6.4 km) northwest of Santa Teresa, New Mexico, United States.

It is home to War Eagles Air Museum and Red Arrow Flight Academy. It is also the home of EAA Chapter 1570, which also conducts Young Eagles Day flights. It is the home of Southwest Skydive LLC, the only skydiving operation in West Texas and Southern New Mexico.

== History ==
In 2020, a US$9 million renovation project on the airport was completed.

In 2024, the Doña Ana County International Jetport was used to arrest Sinaloa Cartel leader Ismael "El Mayo" Zambada.

== Facilities and aircraft ==
Doña Ana County International Jetport covers 170 acres (69 ha) near Santa Teresa, New Mexico. Its one runway, 10/28, is 9,550 by 100 feet (2,911 m x 30 m) and is made of asphalt.

In the 12-month period ending April 8, 2023, the airport had 41,500 operations, an average of 114 per day: 96% general aviation, 3% military, and 1% air taxi. 130 aircraft were then based at this airport: 88 single-engine, 13 multi-engine, 20 jet, and 9 helicopter.

There is a single fixed-base operator (FBO) at the airport, Francis Aviation. It provides aircraft fuel, charters, and facilities to handle corporate aircraft and private charters.

The War Eagles Air Museum, an aerospace and automotive museum with exhibits including classic cars and aircraft, is also located at the airport.

== Red Arrow Flight Academy ==
Red Arrow Flight Academy is a flight school located at Doña Ana County International Jetport.

It offers several programs, such as Flight Training and a "Discovery Flight", and has several aircraft to rent. They have two flight simulators.

=== Aircraft ===
Red Arrow Flight Academy owns six Cessna 172 aircraft.

=== Simulators ===
Red Arrow Flight Academy owns two flight simulators.

The first is a FMX Full Motion Simulator built by Redbird Flight Simulations. It is configured as a Cessna 172 with a Garmin 530 or 430 panel configuration.

The second is a FTS Simulator which comes in 20 different panel configurations for the Cessna 172, Cessna 182, Columbia 350, Cirrus SR20, and Cirrus SR22.

== Incidents and accidents ==
- On June 25, 2024, a single-seated agricultural plane on a training mission which set off from the airport crashed west of Chamberino. The pilot died on impact.
