= War Eagles Air Museum =

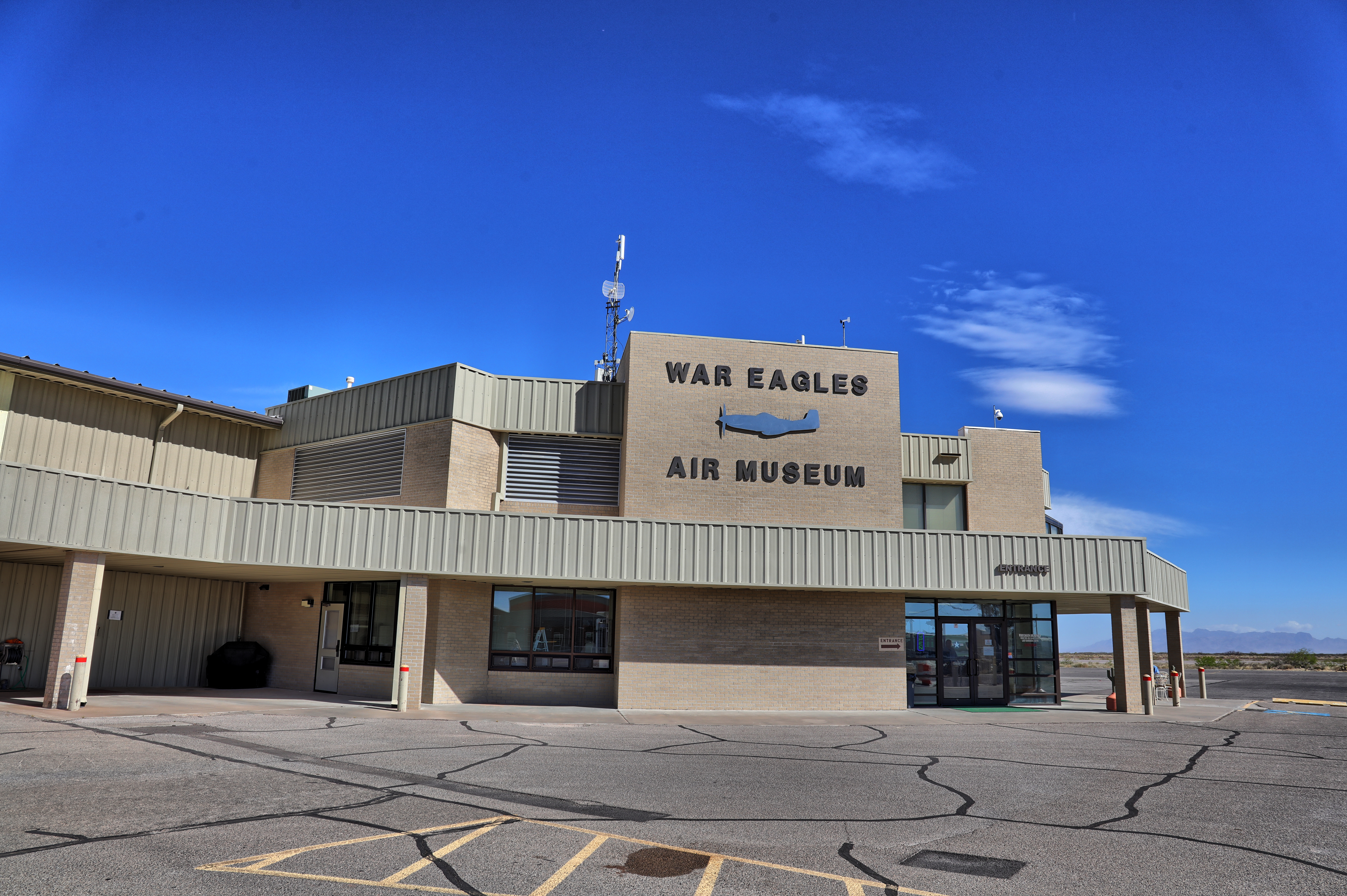
- Museum entrance

- Location within New Mexico
- Established: 13 September 1989
- Location: Santa Teresa, New Mexico
- Coordinates: 31.876°N 106.701°W
- Type: Aviation museum
- Founders: Betty MacGuire; John T. MacGuire
- Website: www.wareaglesairmuseum.com

War Eagles Air Museum is an aerospace and automotive museum with several exhibits. It is located at Doña Ana County International Jetport in Santa Teresa, New Mexico.

== History ==
The museum was established by West Texas engineer, rancher and oilman John T. MacGuire and his wife Betty MacGuire. As pilots, they began collecting warbirds after encountering them in Oshkosh, Wisconsin in 1979. As the collection grew, they looked for a place to build a museum to display their collection. After considering several options such as Las Cruces, New Mexico and Reno, Nevada, John decided to build the museum closer to their home near the Doña Ana County International Airport. The 54,000 sq ft (5,000 m^{2}) facility unofficially opened to the public on 13 September 1989. Shortly after opening, the museum purchased a Tupolev Tu-2 from China.

The museum completed a 10,000 sq ft (930 m^{2}) expansion in 1996.

== Aircraft ==
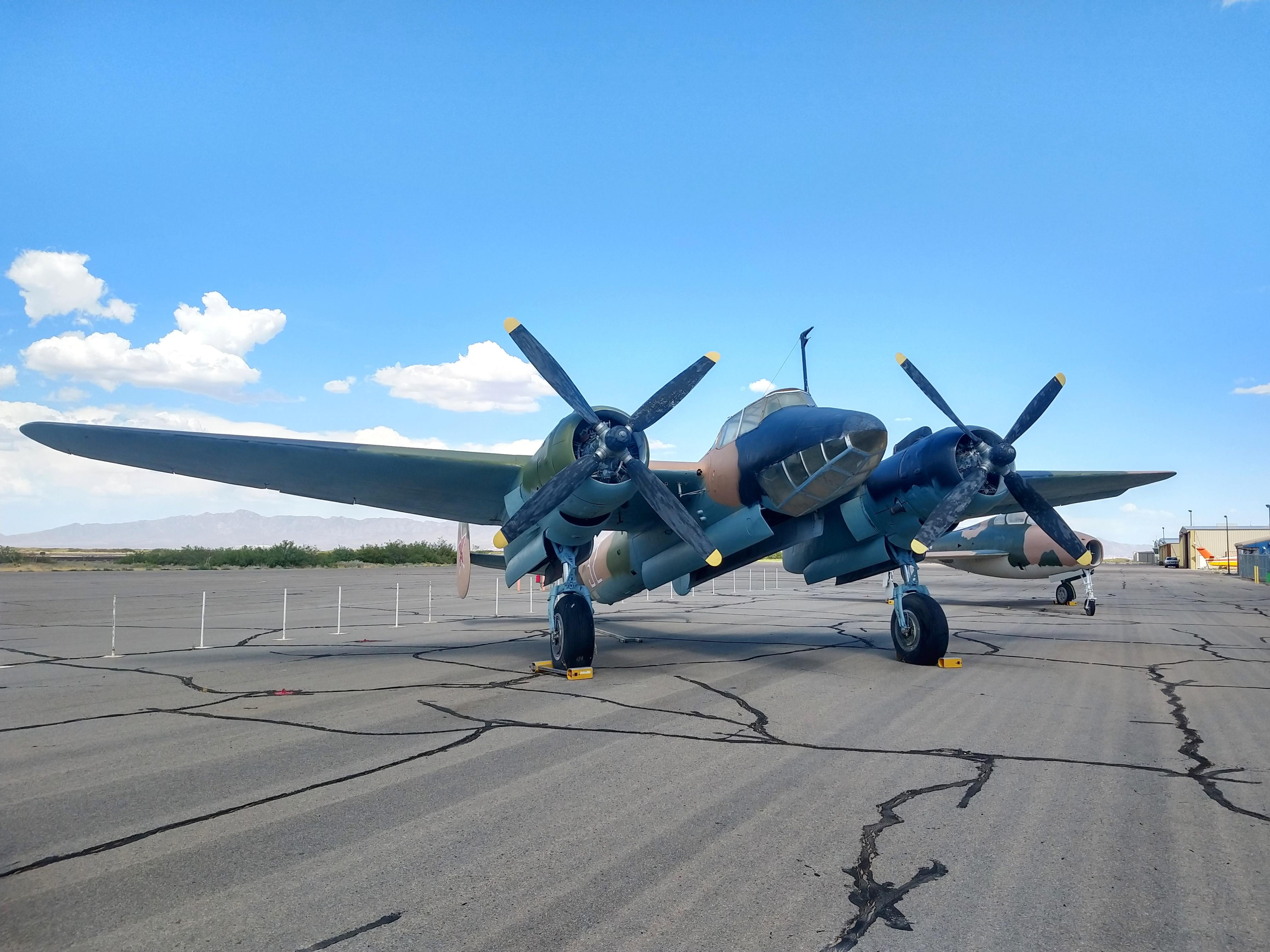
Tupolev Tu-2

- Bell OH-58 Kiowa
- Boeing PT-13D
- Canadair CT-133 Silver Star
- Canadair Sabre 6
- Cessna 140
- Cessna T-37B Tweet
- Curtiss Kittyhawk IA
- de Havilland Tiger Moth
- Douglas RB-26C Invader
- Douglas C-47A Skytrain
- General Motors TBM-3E Avenger
- Hawker Sea Fury FB.10
- Hughes OH-6A Cayuse
- Lockheed F-5G Lightning
- LTV A-7E Corsair II
- Mikoyan-Gurevich MiG-21SPS
- Mil Mi-2
- Morane-Saulnier MS.502
- North American FJ-2 Fury
- North American P-51D Mustang
- North American AT-6F Texan
- North American T-28B Trojan
- Northrop AT-38B Talon
- Piper J-3 Cub
- Republic F-84F Thunderstreak
- Stinson L-5 Sentinel
- Stinson L-13A
- Stinson Reliant
- Tupolev Tu-2
- Vought F4U-4 Corsair
- Vultee BT-13B Valiant
- WSK-Mielec Lim-2
- WSK-Mielec Lim-2

== Automobiles ==
- Auburn Speedster
- BMW R5
- Buick Roadmaster
- Cadillac Biarritz
- Cadillac Eldorado
- Cadillac Series 61
- Cadillac Series 62
- Chevrolet 2-door
- Ford Model A
- Ford Model T
- Ford Mustang
- Ford Standard
- Honda N600
- Jaguar E-Type
- Lincoln Continental Mark IV
- MG TF
- Nash Rambler
- Oldsmobile Curved Dash
- Oldsmobile Custom Cruiser
- Overland Model 24
- Packard One-Twenty
- Packard Super Eight
- Porsche 912
- Rolls-Royce Silver Cloud
- Volvo Amazon

== See also ==
- List of aviation museums
