= Franklin Sedan =

Automobile by H. H. Franklin Manufacturing Company

The Franklin Sedan was an automobile manufactured by the H. H. Franklin Manufacturing Company of Syracuse, New York.

== Franklin Sedan specifications (1926 data) ==
- Color – Several
- Seating Capacity – Five
- Wheelbase – 119 inches
- Wheels - Wood
- Tires - 21” x 5.25” balloon
- Service Brakes – transmission type
- Emergency Brakes – contracting on rear wheels
- Engine - Six cylinder, vertical, cast en bloc, 3-1/4 x 4 inches; head removable; valves in head; H.P. 25.3, S.A.E. formula
- Lubrication – Separate force feed
- Crankshaft - Seven bearing
- Cooling – Air
- Ignition –Storage battery
- Starting System – Two Unit
- Voltage – Six
- Wiring System – Single
- Gasoline System – Vacuum
- Clutch – Dry plate
- Transmission – Selective sliding
- Gear Changes – 3 forward, 1 reverse
- Drive – Spiral bevel
- Rear Springs – Full elliptic
- Rear Axle – Semi-floating
- Steering Gear – Worm and gear

=== Standard equipment ===
New car price included the following items:

- automatic windshield wiper
- Watson stabilizers
- stop light
- spare tire
- cover
- tire carrier and lock
- bumper front
- bumperettes rear
- mirror
- electric primer
- hand tire pump
- complete set of tools, including Zerk oil gun.

=== Optional equipment ===
The following was available at an extra cost:

- None

=== Prices ===
New car prices were available F.O.B. Syracuse, New York, on the following models:

- Sedan - $3200
- Touring - $2650
- Sport Sedan - $3350
- Coupé - $2700
- Sport Runabout - $2800
- Enclosed-drive Limousine - $3500
- Cabriolet - $4400

== See also ==
- Franklin (automobile)
