= Stinson L-13 =

Airplane manufactured by Stinson

L-13 Grasshopper
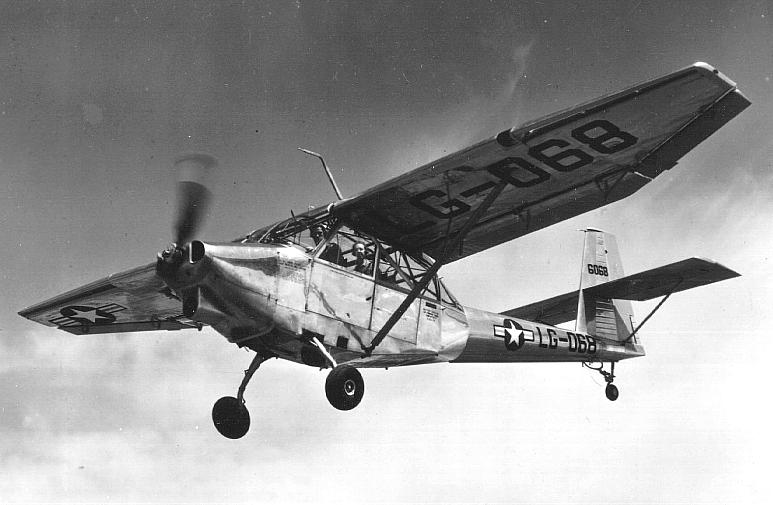
- Note the windows in the roof giving excellent field of vision

General information
- Type: Observation and Utility Aircraft
- Manufacturer: Stinson Aircraft Company
- Primary users: United States Air Force United States Army
- Number built: 302

History
- Introduction date: 1947
- First flight: 1945

The Stinson L-13 (sometimes known as the Grasshopper, like other aircraft of its type) is a US military utility aircraft first flown in 1945.

== Development ==
The aircraft design was developed at Stinson in response to a request from the United States Army Air Force for a light observation/liaison aircraft. At that time Stinson was a subsidiary of Consolidated-Vultee. The first two prototypes were constructed at the Stinson facility in Michigan. In 1948 the Convair board were restructuring their various units, and negotiated to sell the Stinson subsidiary to Piper Aircraft. The L-13 project was specifically not included in the assets of the sale, however, and Convair continued its production in-house; ultimately building 300 units as the Convair L-13.

It was a conventional high-wing tailwheel monoplane used for observation, liaison, and air ambulance duties, which typically require low landing speeds and short landing rolls. It was fitted with a large "greenhouse" to enhance its observation role.

Following their military service and resale into the private market, some units were converted for civil bush flying use, fitting a radial engine by Acme Aircraft Company as the Centaur, while others underwent similar conversions by Caribbean Traders Inc, as the Husky.

== Variants ==
XL-13
Prototype aircraft, powered by 245 hp (183 kW) Franklin O-425-6 engine. Two built.
L-13A
Production aircraft, powered by 250 hp (187 kW) O-425-9 engine. 300 built.
L-13B
Conversion of L-13A for cold weather operation, capable of operating from wheels, skis or floats. 28 converted.
Acme Centaur 101
Conversion of L-13 as six-seat bush aircraft. Powered by 300 hp (224 kW) Lycoming R-680-E3.
Acme Centaur 102
Similar to Acme Centaur 101, with a 300hp Jacobs R-755-A2 radial.

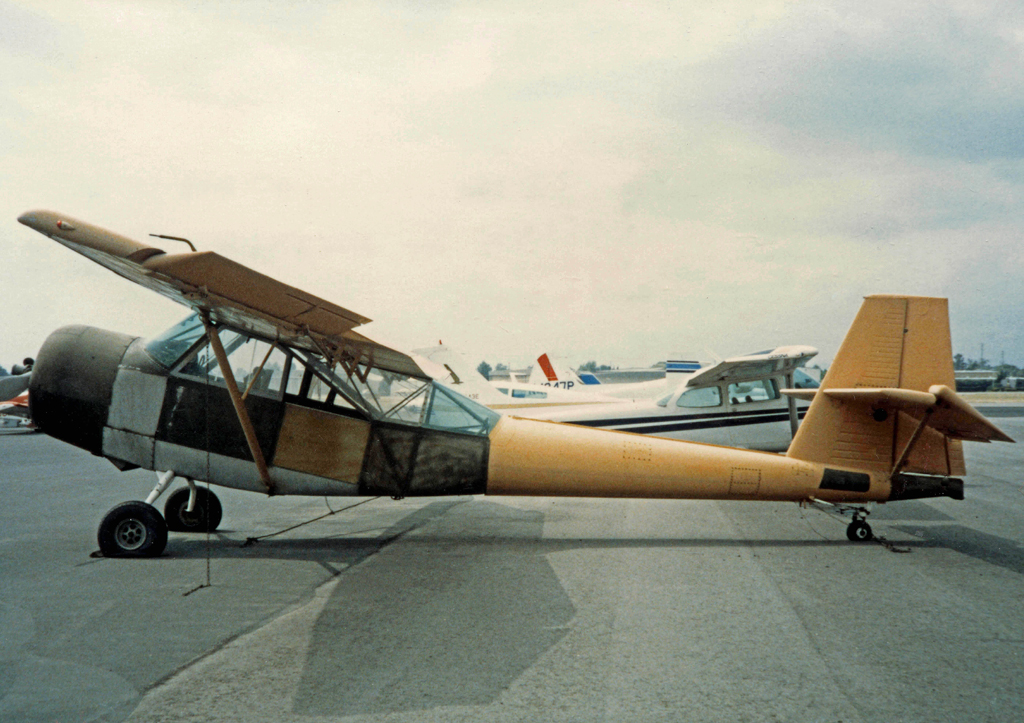
L-13A converted to Caribbean Traders Husky III standard with a 450 h.p. Wright R-975 engine

Caribbean Traders Husky I
Civil conversion of L-13A. Retained O-425 engine.
Caribbean Traders Husky II
Civil conversion of L-13A. Powered by 300 hp R-680-13 engine on modified engine mount capable of swinging out for easy maintenance.
Caribbean Traders Husky III
Similar to Husky II, but powered by 450 hp (338 kW) Wright R-975-7 radial engine.
Servicair Loadmaster
Reconstruction of L-13A with 450 hp Pratt & Whitney R-985-AN-1 radial engine and rearranged four-seat cabin.

== Operators ==
United States

- United States Air Force
- United States Army received 43 ex-Air Force L-13As following the outbreak of the Korean War, serving in the Continental United States to free up aircraft for active service overseas.

== Surviving aircraft ==
=== Brazil ===
- 47-406 – L-13 on display at the TAM Museum in São Carlos, São Paulo.

=== United States ===
- 46-159 – L-13A in storage at the United States Army Aviation Museum at Fort Novosel near Daleville, Alabama.
- 47-275 – L-13A on display at the Arkansas Air and Military Museum in Fayetteville, Arkansas.
- 47-287 – L-13A in storage at the Castle Air Museum in Atwater, California.
- 47-316 – L-13A airworthy at the War Eagles Air Museum in Santa Teresa, New Mexico.
- 47-355 – L-13 on static display at the Pearl Harbor Aviation Museum in Honolulu, Hawaii.
- 47-394 – L-13A on static display at the Planes of Fame Air Museum in Chino, California.
- 47-412 – L-13B airworthy at the Heritage Flight Museum in Burlington, Washington.

== Specifications (L-13A) ==
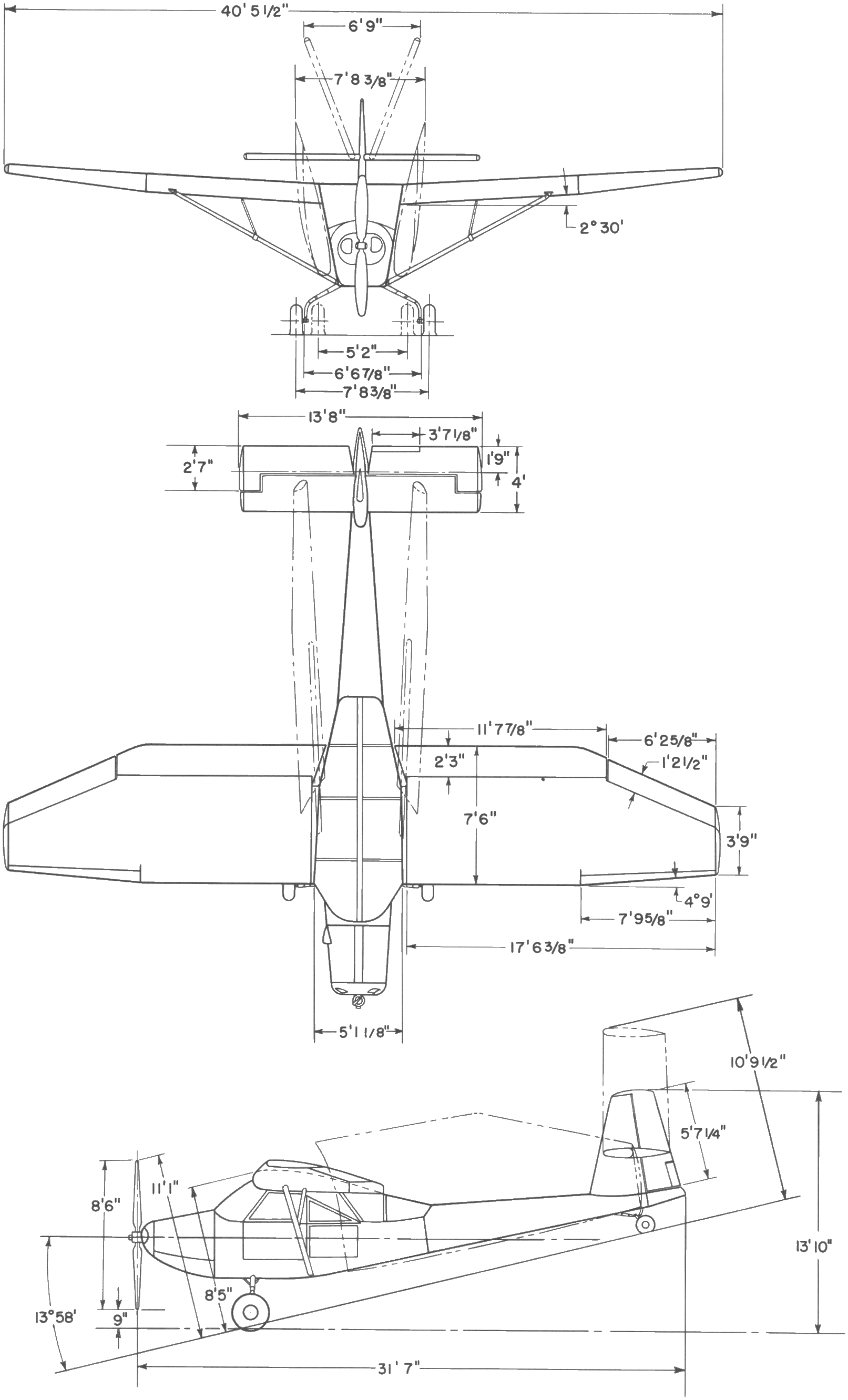
3-view line drawing of the Stinson L-13A

Data from General Dynamics Aircraft and their Predecessors

General characteristics

- Crew: 1
- Capacity: 2 passengers
- Length: 31 ft 9 in (9.68 m)
- Wingspan: 40 ft 5 1/2 in (12.332 m)
- Height: 8 ft 5 in (2.57 m)
- Wing area: 270 sq ft (25 m^{2})
- Empty weight: 2,070 lb (939 kg)
- Gross weight: 3,185 lb (1,445 kg)
- Powerplant: 1 × Franklin O-425-9 air-cooled flat-six engine, 250 hp (190 kW)

Performance

- Maximum speed: 115 mph (185 km/h, 100 kn)
- Cruise speed: 92 mph (148 km/h, 80 kn)
- Range: 368 mi (592 km, 320 nmi)
- Service ceiling: 15,000 ft (4,600 m)
- Rate of climb: 830 ft/min (4.2 m/s)

== See also ==
Aircraft of comparable role, configuration, and era

- Cessna O-1 Bird Dog
