= Franklin O-805 =

American air-cooled aircraft piston engine designed in the mid-1940s

O-805/12AC
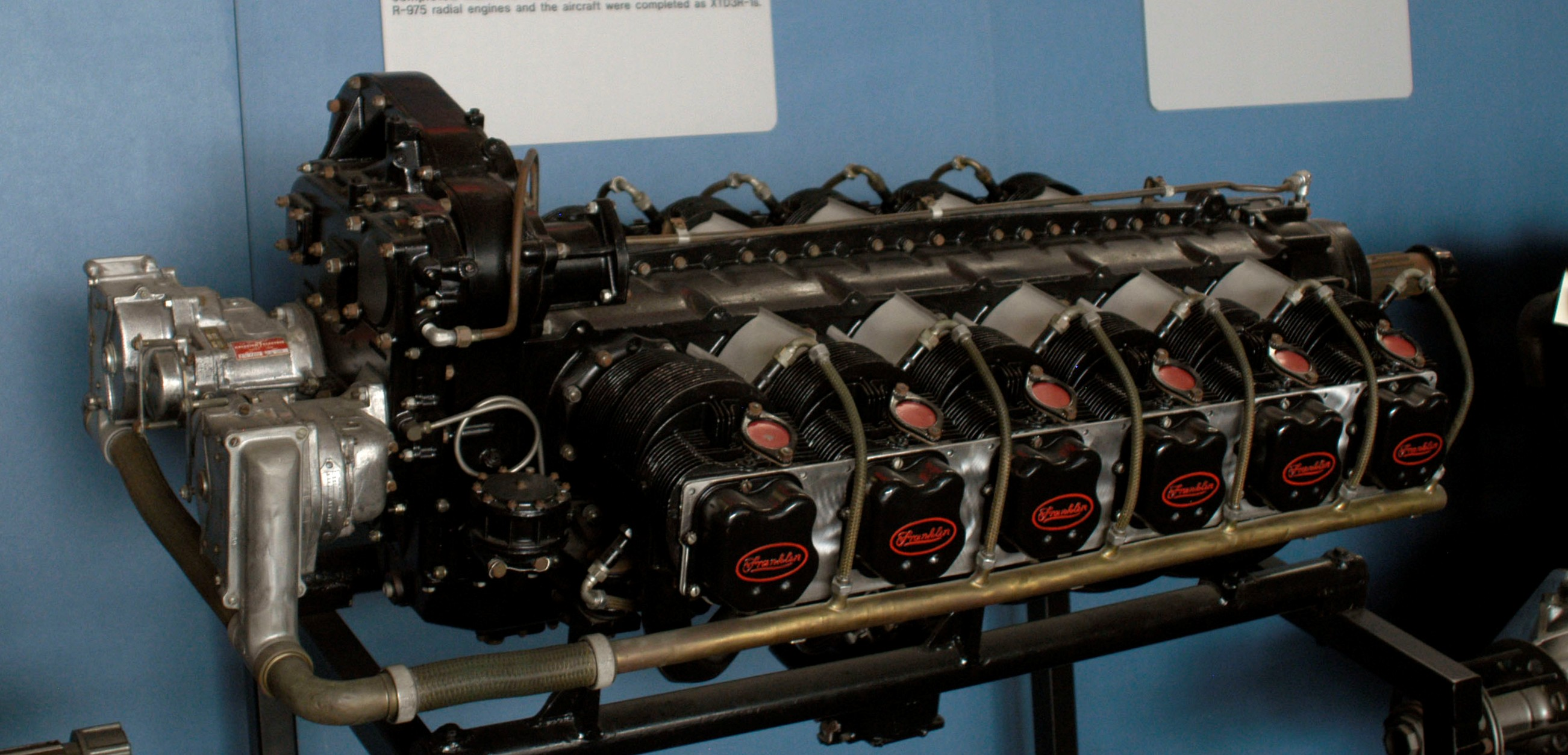
- Franklin O-805 on display at the National Museum of the United States Air Force
- Type: 12-cylinder horizontally opposed piston engine
- Manufacturer: Franklin Engine Company
- First run: c. 1945

The Franklin O-805 (company designation 12AC) was an American air-cooled aircraft piston engine, designed in the mid-1940s and was to be used in radio-controlled pilotless drones that were to be guided from an accompanying control plane. Due to project requirement changes and cancellations the engine was not produced.

A smaller displacement 12-cylinder Franklin engine of 1941 was known as the O-595 or 12AC-596.

== Variants ==
=== O-805 ===
12AC-806
450 hp (336 kW)0
12ACG-806 (XO-805-1)
456 hp (340 kW) at 3,200 rpm, geared to 0.632:1.
12ACGSA-806 (XO-805-3 and O-805-5)
500 hp (373 kW) at 3,200 rpm, supercharged and geared to 0.632:1 (XO-805-3), or to 0.587:1 (O-805-5).

=== O-595 ===
12AC-596
300 hp (224 kW) at 2,600 rpm

12ACG-596
350 hp (261 kW) at 3,500 rpm

== Applications (intended) ==
- Interstate XBQ-5
- Interstate XTD2R-1

== Survivors ==
- There is an O-805-2 on display at the New England Air Museum, Bradley International Airport, Windsor Locks, CT
- One surfaced and was sold privately in August, 2016, on eBay for US$8500.

== Specifications (12ACGSA-806/XO-805-3) ==
=== General characteristics ===
- Type: 12-cylinder air-cooled horizontally opposed aircraft piston engine
- Bore: 4.625 in (117.5 mm)
- Stroke: 4.0 in (101.6 mm)
- Displacement: 806.4 cu in (13.2 L)

=== Components ===
- Valvetrain: OHV
- Cooling system: Air-cooled
- Reduction gear: 0.632

=== Performance ===
- Power output: 500 hp (373 kW) at 3,200 rpm

== See also ==
Related lists

- List of aircraft engines
