= Harold E. Thompson =

American helicopter aviation pioneer

Harold E. "Tommy" Thompson (1921 – October 29, 2003 of Hobart, Indiana, was a helicopter aviation pioneer. He was the first man to intentionally loop a helicopter, set three international helicopter speed records, and was the first man to land a helicopter in the courtyard of The Pentagon. Thompson was a veteran of 3,500 hours in single-engine propeller fixed-wing aircraft and 3000 more in helicopters.

== Life ==
Having spent two years at Purdue University, Thompson was called up into the United States Army Air Forces in 1943, a week after he had married his childhood sweetheart, Carolyn Kramer. Thompson served as a P-47 instructor at Moore Field in Mission, Texas, until January 1945, when he earned an assignment to the Army's first helicopter class at Chanute Field, Illinois. Later, he was assigned to the Bridgeport, Connecticut, plant of Igor Sikorsky, who pioneered helicopters in America.

After the war, "Tommy" as he was known, got a job as one – and with 28 the youngest – of Sikorsky's three test pilots—in the trial and error days. The plant produced six helicopters a month, mostly hand built. Engineers tinkered with new designs, and the test pilots tried them out. Most of the early models had slow, sluggish controls - some flew as expected, but others didn't. Thompson was also Igor Sikorsky's personal pilot. By 1949, Thompson was an experienced helicopter pilot. He had been through some forced landings and crashes, but had not been seriously injured.

== Records set in the S-52-1 ==
Starting in late 1945 Sikorsky engineers developed the Sikorsky S-52 helicopter, its prototype flew first in 1947.

"It was a sharp, responsive dream," Thompson recalls. "After trying some mild acrobatics, I figured it would loop." Until Thompson, no one had dared try to loop a helicopter. As Sikorsky's chief test pilot Jimmy Viner pointed out, "Any of 10 things can go wrong--all fatal, be sure you know what you're doing." Thompson did—erratically at first, then perfectly—10 loops in all, as a 8 mm movie camera recorded the flight at Bridgeport, Connecticut on May 9, 1949, for history.

That year, he went to the Cleveland air races with the S-52, where he set the first of three international speed records that he was to achieve in the helicopters: 129.616 miles per hour (208.597 km/h) over 3 kilometres (1.9 mi).

== Flight instructor ==
Thompson also taught others how to fly helicopters. His students included Admiral Arthur W. Radford; Pat Handy, first woman to fly solo in a helicopter; and Rodman Wanamaker, Eastern department store tycoon.

== Last flight ==
His career came to an abrupt halt on a spring day in 1950, when he took an admiral aloft at the Navy's Lakehurst, New Jersey, base. Suddenly, a shaft snapped, and the tail rotor came apart.

Thompson skillfully kept the craft from spinning around, the usual result of such an accident. The helicopter landed hard, crushed the landing gear and tilted, while the spinning overhead rotor chewed up the ground and disintegrated. Tommy crawled out with nothing worse than a cut cheek. The admiral was shaken, but game: "All in a day's work, eh, boy?" Thompson however had walked away from more than 20 forced landings and now his fifth helicopter crash. Figuring he had stretched the law of averages too far, he replied, "Maybe for you, sir, but not for me". That night, when he got home he talked to his wife and refrained from flying again in a helicopter until 1979.

== Later life ==
After his flying career came to a halt, he moved back to Hobart, Indiana, and began working with his father, delivering fuel oil for the Standard Oil Company. In 1979, Thompson visited the Tucson Convention Center where a large helicopter convention was taking place. He immediately was recognized for his feats during the convention and given the opportunity to pilot one of Sikorsky's S-58s.

Currently he is honored at the Smithsonian National Air and Space Museum in Washington, D.C., outside the entrance to the Steven F. Udvar-Hazy Center. Thompson can be found on Panel #37, Tablet #1, Column #1.

Thompson died on October 29, 2003, in Hobart, Indiana. He was survived by his wife Carolyn, their two sons and five grandchildren.
