= Sikorsky S-52 =

1948 utility helicopter family

S-52
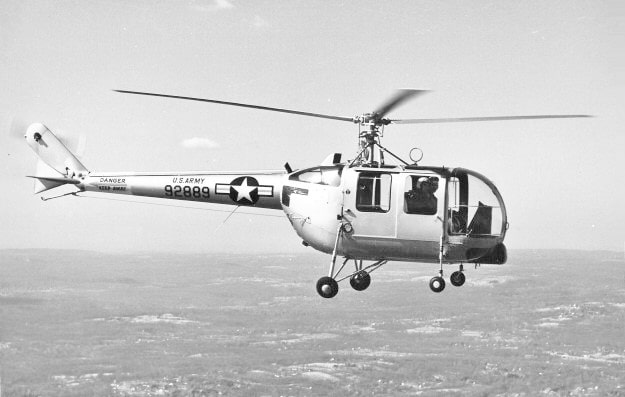
- U.S. Army YH-18A in testing

General information
- Type: Helicopter
- Manufacturer: Sikorsky Aircraft
- Status: In service
- Primary users: United States Navy United States Army; United States Marine Corps; United States Coast Guard
- Number built: 93

History
- Introduction date: April 1951
- First flight: 12 February 1947
- Variants: Sikorsky XH-39; Vertical Hummingbird

The Sikorsky S-52 is a utility helicopter developed by Sikorsky Aircraft in the late 1940s. It was used by the U.S. Navy, Marine Corps, and Coast Guard. The S-52 was the first US helicopter with all-metal rotor blades. Initially a two-seater, it was developed into the four-seat S-52-2 and S-52-3. It was designated HO5S-1 by the U.S. Navy and Marine Corps, HO5S-1G by the Coast Guard, and YH-18A by the U.S. Army, and was used extensively by civil operators after being retired by the military.

== Design and development ==
Sikorsky Aircraft began designing the S-52 in late 1945. The prototype S-52, first flown in 1947, was a two-seater and used a 178 hp (133 kW) Franklin air-cooled flat-six piston engine. The prototype pioneered the use of all-metal main and tail rotor blades along with offset flapping hinges for the main rotor, which allowed greater maneuverability and would become a trademark Sikorsky design feature. The aircraft was granted a Civil Aeronautics Authority type certificate on 25 February 1948. The S-52 was soon developed into the S-52-1 with the installation of a more powerful 245 hp (183 kW) Franklin engine.

The first American helicopter to have all-metal rotor blades, the prototype set several speed and height records in 1948, including 129.6 mph (204.2 km/h) on a 3 km (2 mi) course, 122.75 mph (197.54 km/h) on a 1 km (1,100 yd) circuit, and an absolute height of 21,220 ft (6,468 m). It was capable of hover out of ground effect at 5,900 ft (1,798 m) or 9,200 ft (2,804 m) in ground effect. The S-52 was the first helicopter to be flown in a loop, as flown by Harold E. Thompson on 19 May 1949.

The two-seat version was modified into the S-52-2, a four-seat helicopter using a 245 hp (183 kW) Franklin O-425-1 air-cooled flat-six, which was moved slightly to the rear to accommodate the enlarged cabin. It had a semi-monocoque fuselage of pod-and-boom arrangement with a large bubble-like front greenhouse, a three-blade rotor, and quadricycle fixed landing gear replacing the earlier tricycle arrangement. The production S-52-3 (HO5S-1) incorporated a downward sloping (anhedral) v-tail stabilizer. It also had sliding doors on the right forward and left rear sides, and a vertically split front bubble, allowing the left half to swing open in a clamshell fashion. The engine was placed at the aft end of the cabin and was canted forward 30 degrees to couple with the clutch and transmission. The pilot-in-command occupied the right front seat, while the front clamshell allowed two patients on stretchers to be loaded into the left side of the aircraft, where they could be attended by a medic in the right rear seat during medevac missions.

The S-52 also served as the basis of the turbine-powered S-59 (originally designated S-52-5 or YH-18B), which as the XH-39, competed for and lost the contract that produced the Bell UH-1 Iroquois. This aircraft differed in having a four-bladed rotor (against the S-52's three) and retractable tricycle gear.

== Operational history ==
The U.S. Navy operated the aircraft as a utility type and it was used by the Marine Corps for observation and scouting in the Korean War. The Marine Corps also extensively used the HO5S for medevac in that war, as it could carry two wounded marines on stretchers internally, which was considered an advantage over the Bell HTL, which could only carry stretchers externally.

Four S-52s were evaluated by the U.S. Army for utility use in 1950, as the YH-18A, but not purchased in quantity. YH-18A serial number 42-2890 was later rebuilt as an XH-39 prototype.

In September 1952, eight S-52-3 aircraft were delivered to the U.S. Coast Guard as the HO5S-1G, but were found to be too slow, small, and short-ranged for search and rescue, and were placed in storage beginning in April 1954.

Many former military S-52 aircraft were demilitarized, rebuilt, and licensed for civil use, and in 1964, Orlando Helicopter Airways (OHA) acquired the type certificate and parts inventory from Sikorsky. In the early 1960s, OHA founder Fred Clark had used a fleet of three S-52 aircraft for powerline inspections and to shuttle VIPs and members of the news media between Orlando, Florida, and the Kennedy Space Center at Cape Canaveral. OHA would eventually acquire at least 17 S-52 aircraft, which were extensively used for long-distance powerline inspection flights—a role that Clark found the S-52 to be well suited for, as it was more comfortable to fly and had a longer range than the then-prevalent Bell 47.

In 1981, a NASA scientist contacted Clark, proposing to develop a proof of concept electric-powered crewed helicopter. OHA had a hurricane-damaged former Marine Corps HO5S-1 in storage, and using NASA funds, the aircraft was rebuilt with four salvaged 60 hp (45 kW) electric starter motors from disused turboshaft engines along with fourteen 72V lead-acid batteries. In 1983, the aircraft was briefly flown under onboard electric power, but proved to have motor synchronization problems. OHA obtained additional funding from NASA, hoping to replace the troublesome four-motor setup with a single 240 hp (180 kW) torpedo motor that would eliminate the transmission, but was unable to obtain the desired motor from the U.S. Navy; OHA consequently stored the aircraft indefinitely in 1984 and the project was eventually abandoned. Although ultimately unsuccessful, the electric-powered HO5S-1 is believed to be the first crewed eVTOL aircraft to have flown using onboard battery power rather than a cable tethered to a ground-based power supply.

A restored HO5S-1—then one of the only flyable examples of the type—is featured in the 2022 film Devotion.

== Variants ==
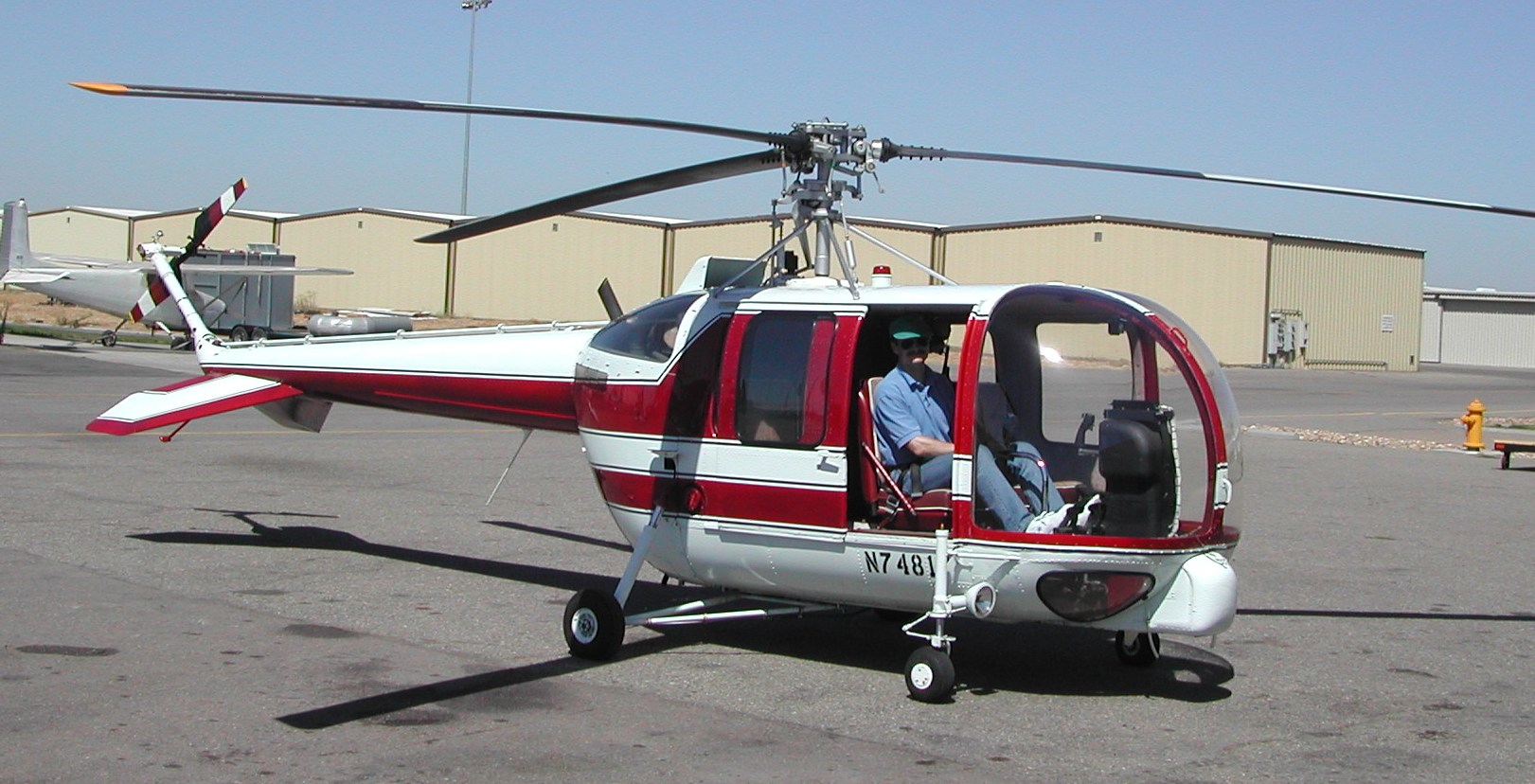
Sikorsky S-52-3

S-52-1
Two-seat prototype, first flown in 1948. Four built.

S-52-2
Improved three/four-seat variant.

S-52-3
Variant of the S-52-2 for the United States Navy and Coast Guard, designated HO5S-1 and HO5S-1G.

YH-18A
Four S-52-2s for evaluation by the United States Army, two later converted into XH-39s.

HO5S-1

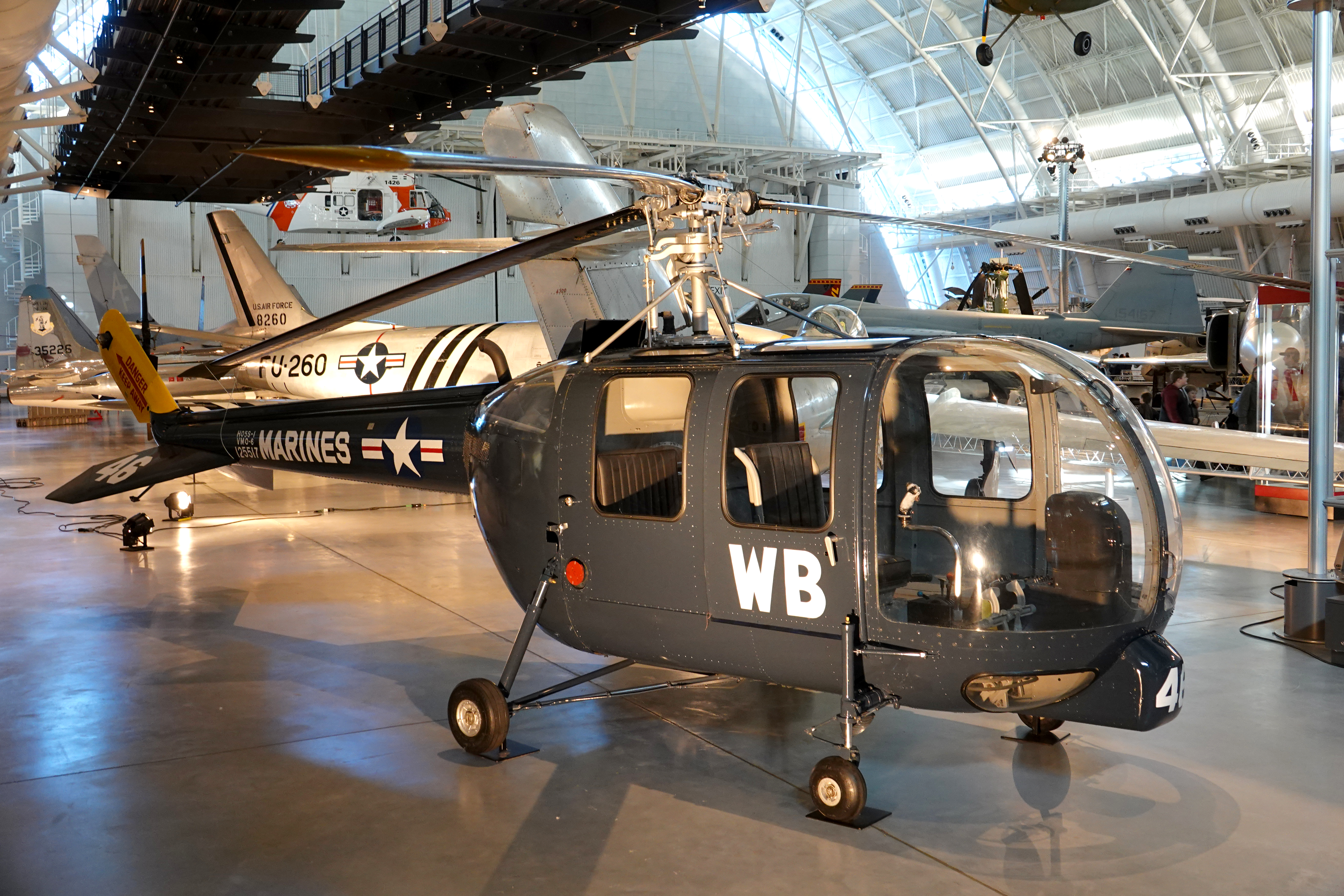
The Sikorsky S-52 (HO5S-1) at the Smithsonian's Udvar-Hazy center

Model S-52-3, a United States Navy variant of the four-seat S-52-2, 79 built.

HO5S-1G
As HO5S-1 for the United States Coast Guard, eight built.

XH-39
Model S-59 turboshaft-powered prototype modified from two YH-18As.

Experimental Electric S-52
Model S-52-2 battery-powered prototype using four 60-hp (45-kW) alternating current (AC) starter/generators and fourteen 72-Volt lead acid batteries producing 240–300 hp (180– 225 kW) for 10 minutes.

Vertical Hummingbird
Sold by Vertical Aviation Technologies of Sanford, Florida, the Hummingbird 300L is a kit-built design using the basic airframe, blades, main transmission, and tail rotor drive of the Sikorsky S-52 helicopter, but streamlined with a Bell 206 JetRanger nosecone and windshields. The Hummingbird is powered by an IO-540 — a vertically mounted, opposed six-cylinder air-cooled engine.

== Operators ==
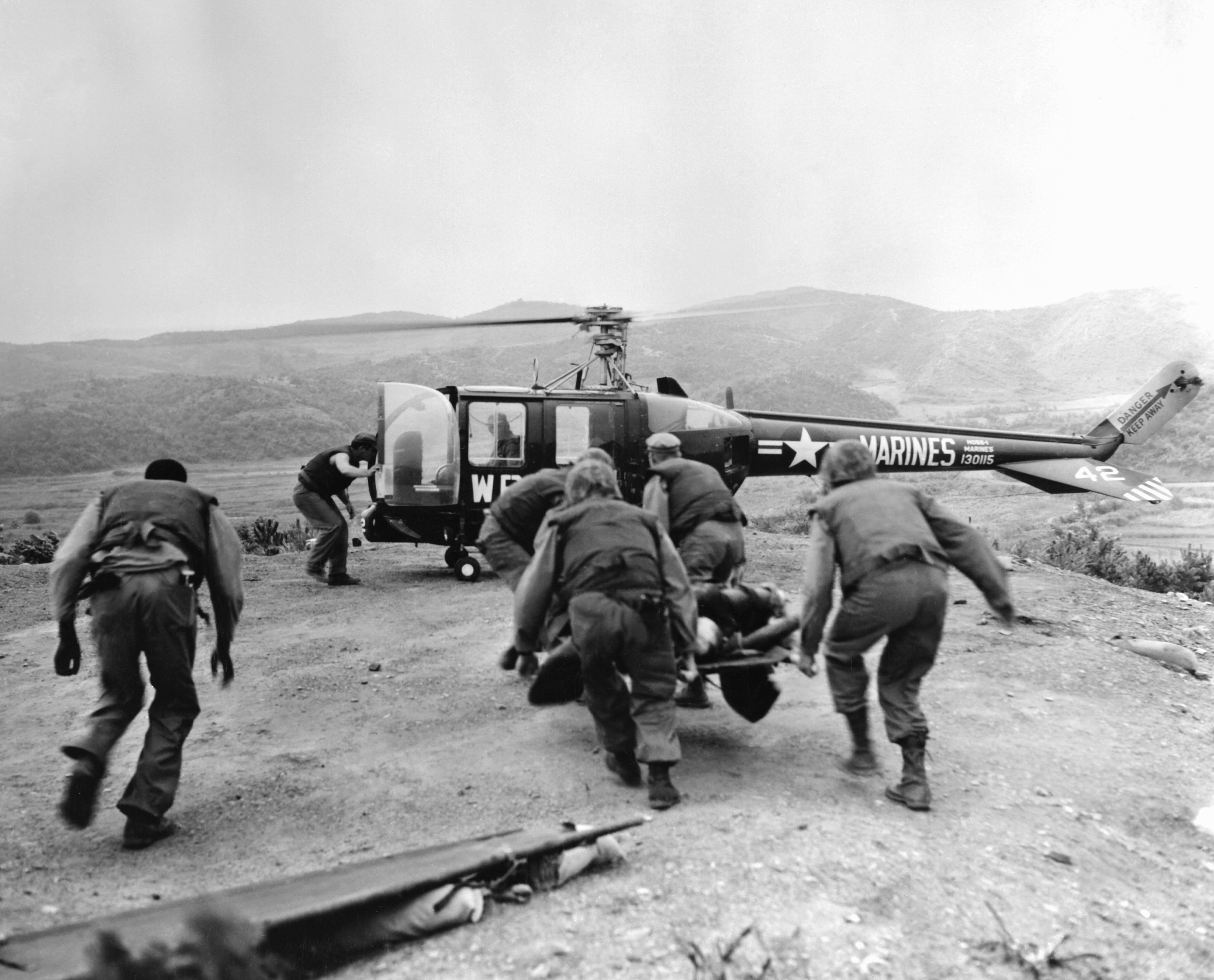
A U.S. Marine Corps HO5S-1 evacuating wounded in Korea, 1953. One stretcher has already been loaded through the front clamshell.

Honduras

- Honduran Air Force

United States

- United States Army
- United States Coast Guard
- United States Marine Corps
- United States Navy

== Specifications ==
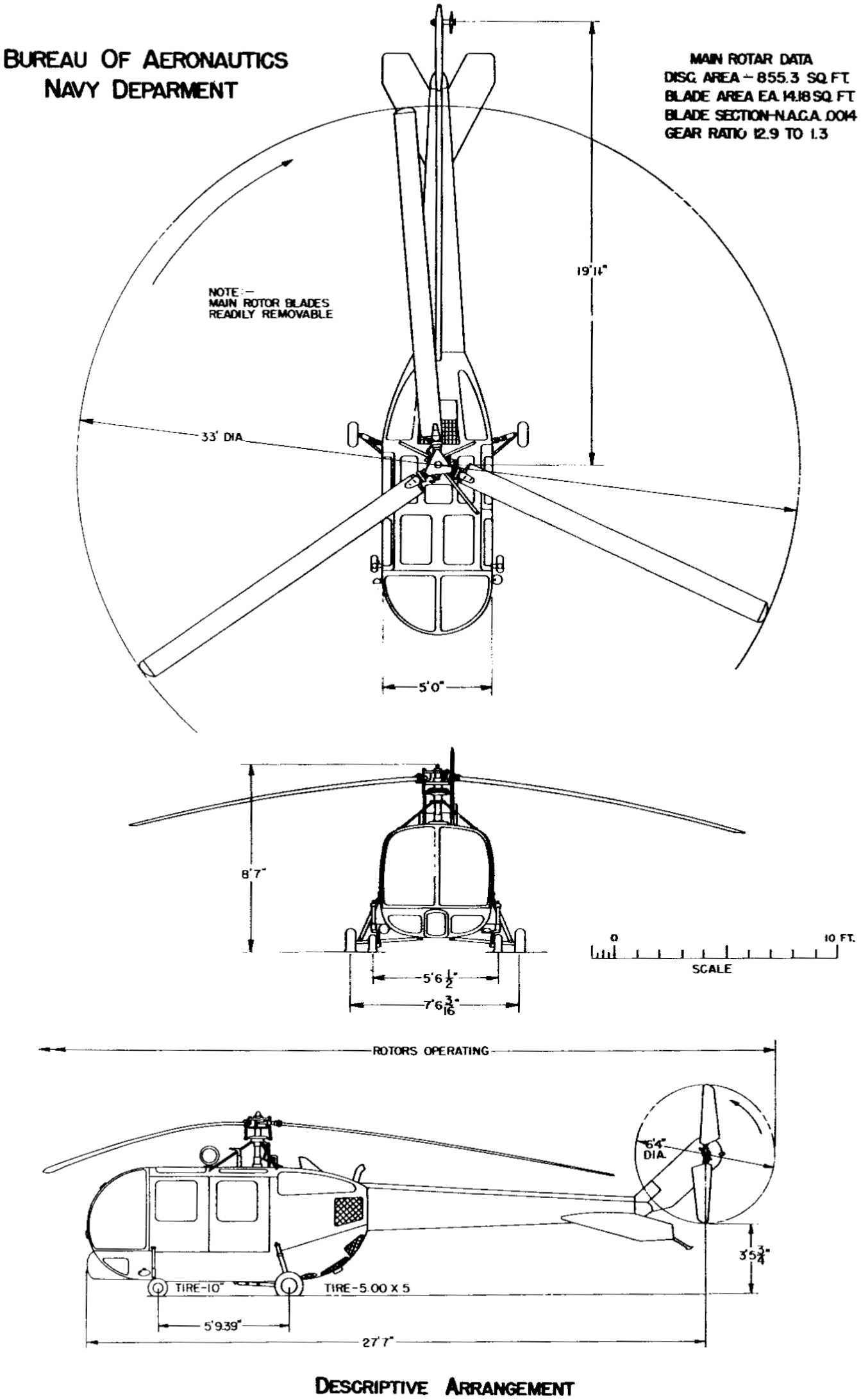
3-view line drawing of the Sikorsky HO5S-1

Data from Jane's All The World's Aircraft 1951–52.

General characteristics

- Crew: two
- Capacity: two passengers or two stretchers
- Length: 27 ft 5 in (8.36 m) (fuselage length)
- Height: 8 ft 8 in (2.64 m)
- Empty weight: 1,650 lb (748 kg)
- Gross weight: 2,400 lb (1,089 kg)
- Max takeoff weight: 2,700 lb (1,225 kg) (overload)
- Fuel capacity: 62 US gal (230 L; 52 imp gal)
- Powerplant: 1 × Franklin 6V6-245-B16F air-cooled six-cylinder horizontally-opposed piston engine, 245 hp (183 kW)
- Main rotor diameter: 33 ft 0 in (10.06 m)
- Main rotor area: 855 sq ft (79.4 m^{2})

Performance

- Maximum speed: 110 mph (180 km/h, 96 kn) at sea level
- Cruise speed: 96 mph (154 km/h, 83 kn)
- Range: 415 mi (668 km, 361 nmi)
- Service ceiling: 15,500 ft (4,700 m)
- Rate of climb: 1,300 ft/min (6.6 m/s)

== See also ==
Related development

- Sikorsky XH-39
- Vertical Hummingbird

Related lists

- List of civil aircraft
- List of military aircraft of the United States
- List of rotorcraft
