= Franklin O-425 =

American piston aircraft engine

O-425/6AG/6V6
- Type: Piston aircraft engine
- National origin: United States
- Manufacturer: Franklin Engine Company
- First run: 1944

The Franklin O-425 (company designation 6AG/6V6) was an American air-cooled aircraft engine that first ran in the mid-1940s. The engine was of six-cylinder, horizontally-opposed layout and displaced 425 cu in (7 L). The power output was between 240 hp (179 kW) and 285 hp (213 kW) depending on variant. The O-405-13 (6V6-300-D16FT) of 1955 was a vertically mounted, turbocharged and fan cooled version for helicopters.

== Variants ==
6AG6-245
Geared propeller drive at 0.623:1, 245 hp (183 kW) at 3,300 rpm, (XO-425-5).

6AGS6-245
Supercharged and geared, 250 hp (186 kW) at 3,200 rpm, (XO-425-3).

6V6-245-B16F
Vertically mounted, fan-cooled helicopter version, 245 hp (183 kW) at 3,275 rpm, (XO-425-1).

6V6-300-D16FT
Vertically mounted, turbocharged, fan-cooled helicopter version, 285 hp (213 kW) at 3,275 rpm, (O-425-13).

O-425-1

O-425-2

O-425-3

O-425-5

O-425-9

O-425-13

== Applications ==
- Convair XL-13
- Republic YOA-15 (intended)
- Sikorsky S-52
- Sikorsky YH-18
- Stinson L-13

== Specifications (O-425-5) ==
Data from Aircraft engines of the World 1950.

=== General characteristics ===
- Type: 6-cylinder air-cooled horizontally-opposed aircraft piston engine
- Bore: 4.75 in (120.7 mm)
- Stroke: 4 in (101.6 mm)
- Displacement: 425.3 cu in (6.97 L)
- Length: 47 in (120 cm)
- Width: 33.3 in (84.6 cm)
- Height: 30 in (76 cm)
- Dry weight: 405 lb (184 kg)

=== Components ===
- Valvetrain: 1 x exhaust and inlet OHV driven by pushrods and rockers
- Fuel system: 1 x Bendix-Stromberg PS-780 up-draught carburetor with automatic mixture control
- Fuel type: 80 Octane / US Army 2-103 all-purpose motor fuel
- Oil system: Pressure system at 55 psi (380 kPa)
- Cooling system: Air-cooled

=== Performance ===
- Power output:

- Take-off: 245 hp (183 kW) at 3,300 rpm
- Normal: 240 hp (180 kW) at 3,200 rpm at sea level
- Cruise: 168 hp (125 kW) at 2,840 rpm at sea level

- Specific power: 0.58 hp/cu in (26 kW/L)
- Compression ratio: 7.4:1
- Specific fuel consumption: 0.51 lb/hp/h (0.086 kg/kW/ks)
- Oil consumption: 0.015 lb/hp/h (0.0025 kg/kW/ks)
- Power-to-weight ratio: 0.606 hp/lb (0.996 kW/kg)
- Reduction gear: Planetary reduction gearing at 0.623:1

== See also ==
Comparable engines

- Continental O-470
- Lycoming O-480

Related lists

- List of aircraft engines
