= Franklin Engine Company =

American manufacturer of aircraft engines

- Industry: Aerospace engineering
- Founded: 1902
- Defunct: 1975
- Headquarters: Syracuse, New York, United States
- Parent: H. H. Franklin Manufacturing Company (1893-1934); Republic Aviation (1945–1947); Tucker Car (1947–1961); Aero Industries (1961–1975)

The Franklin Engine Company was an American manufacturer of aircraft engines. Its designs were used primarily in the civilian market, both in fixed wing and helicopter designs. It was briefly directed towards automobile engines as part of the Tucker Car Corporation, returning to aviation when that company failed. The company was later purchased by the Government of Poland.

== History ==
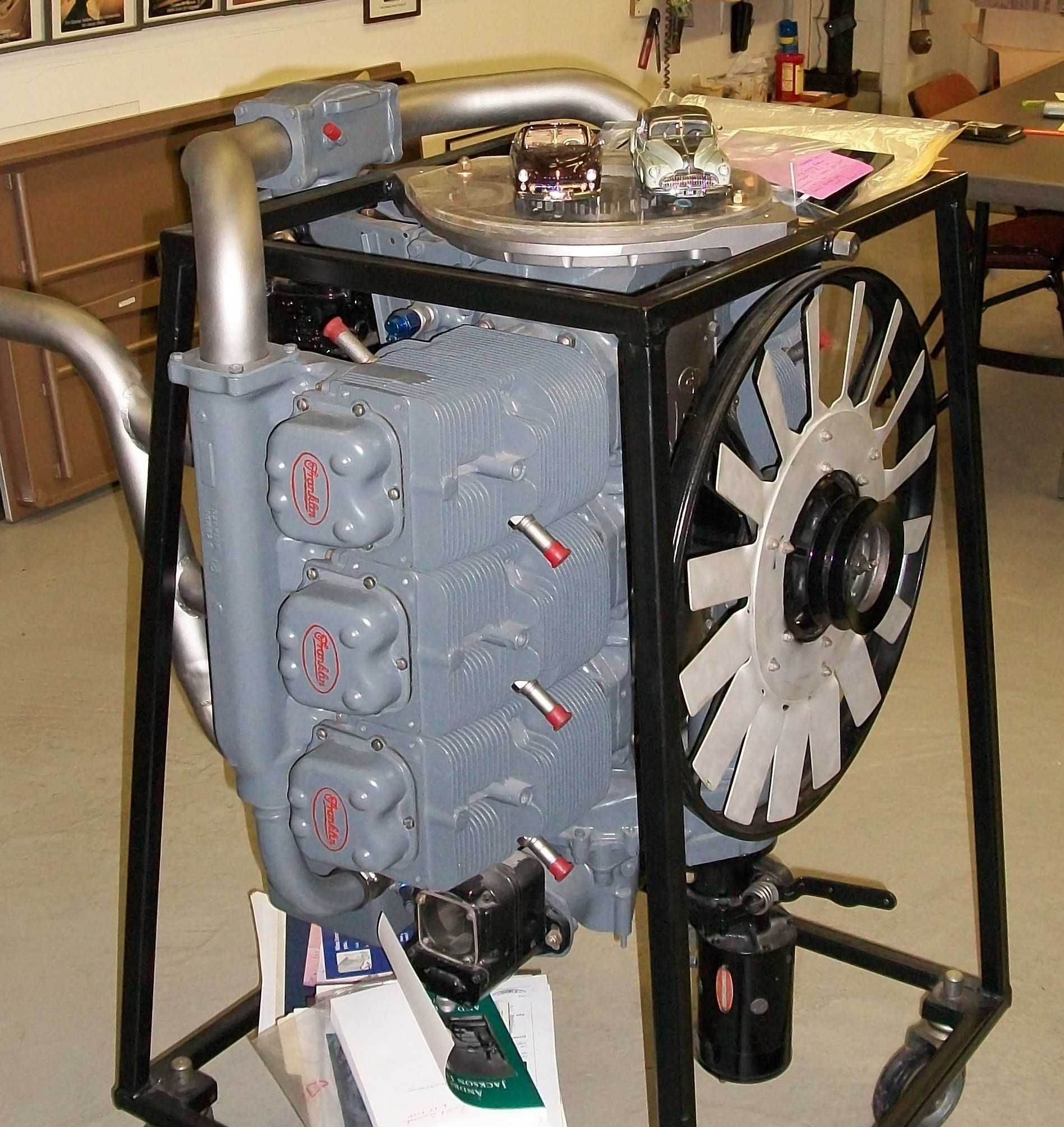
Franklin O-335

The firm began as the H. H. Franklin Co. in 1902 in Syracuse, New York, US, to produce Franklin air-cooled automobiles. Barely surviving bankruptcy in 1933, the company was purchased by a group of ex-employees and renamed Air-cooled Motors in 1937. While the company kept the name of "Air-cooled Motors," its engines continued to be marketed under the Franklin name. Engineers Carl Doman and Ed Marks kept the company alive through the depression by manufacturing air-cooled truck and industrial engines.

During World War II Air-cooled Motors was very successful producing helicopter and airplane engines. Several aircraft carried its engines, including the Aero-Flight Streak, Bartlett Zephyr, Bell 47, Bellanca Cruisair, Brantly B-1, Goodyear Duck, H-23 Raven, Hiller 360, Piper J-3F Cub, Seibel S-4, Sikorsky S-52, Stinson Voyager, Taylorcraft 15, Temco TE-1B, and the YT-35 Buckaroo.

Air-cooled Motors was purchased by Republic Aviation Company in 1945 to produce engines for its Republic Seabee light amphibious aircraft. After the war, demand for the engines dropped dramatically and Republic was unsure of the company's future.

In 1947 Air-cooled Motors was purchased for $1.8 million by the Tucker Car Corporation to produce an engine for the 1948 Tucker Sedan. After the purchase, Tucker cancelled all of the company's aircraft contracts so that its resources could be focused on making automotive engines for the Tucker. At the time Air-cooled Motors had held over 65% of postwar U.S. aviation engine production contracts. As a result of the shift, when the Tucker Car Corporation failed amidst allegations of stock fraud, Air-cooled nearly failed with it.

Tucker and the Tucker family owned the firm until 1961, when it was sold to Aero Industries, which restored the name Franklin Engine Company.

In 1975 the government of Poland bought the company and moved it to Rzeszów, first under the name PZL-Franklin and later PZL-F. The company is now called Franklin Aircraft Engines Sp. z o.o. with the address ul. Chełmińska 208 in 86-300 Grudziądz city in Poland. At Aero Friedrichshafen 2016 the company had new engines on display. The innovations include modifications to the type certificate of the 6A-350; the approval for MOGAS, as well as fuel injection is pending at EASA.

New Franklin engines built by Franklin Aircraft Engines Sp. z o.o. are available in the United States from Franklin Aircraft Engines, Inc. of Fort Collins, Colorado. In addition, there are a number of restoration and service options for "legacy" or rather original US built Franklin engines. Because of inherent engine balance, size, power to weight, and comparative cost to competing engines, Franklins are popular choices for experimental aircraft and have a significant list of approved supplemental type certificates.

== Products ==
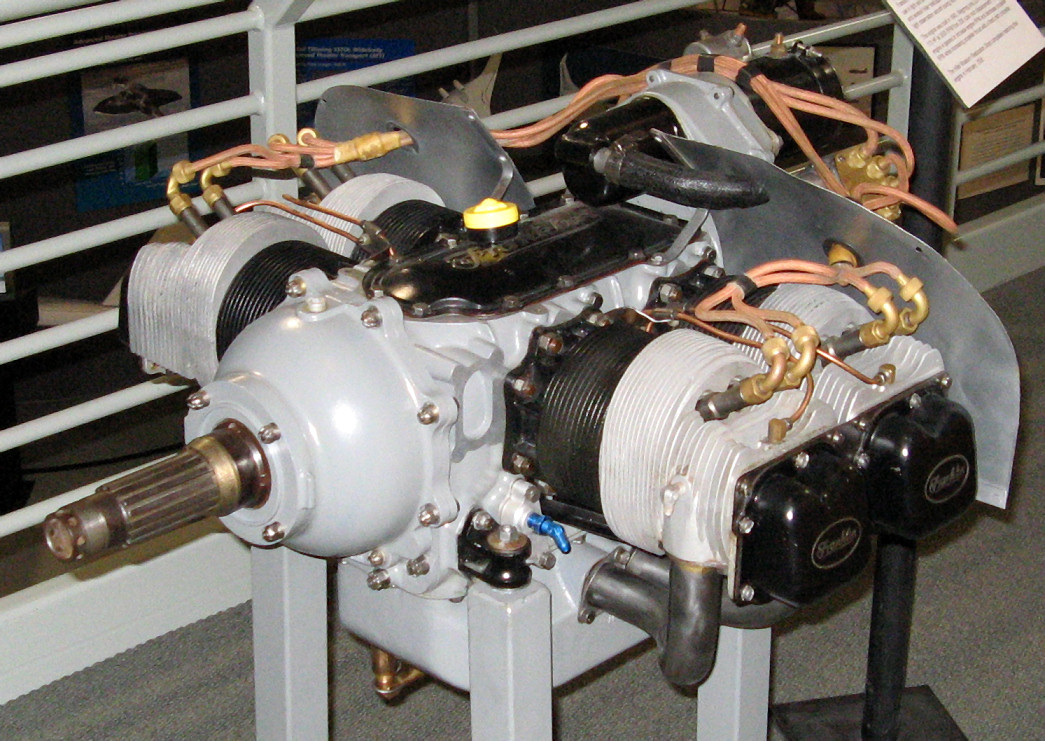
Franklin O-200

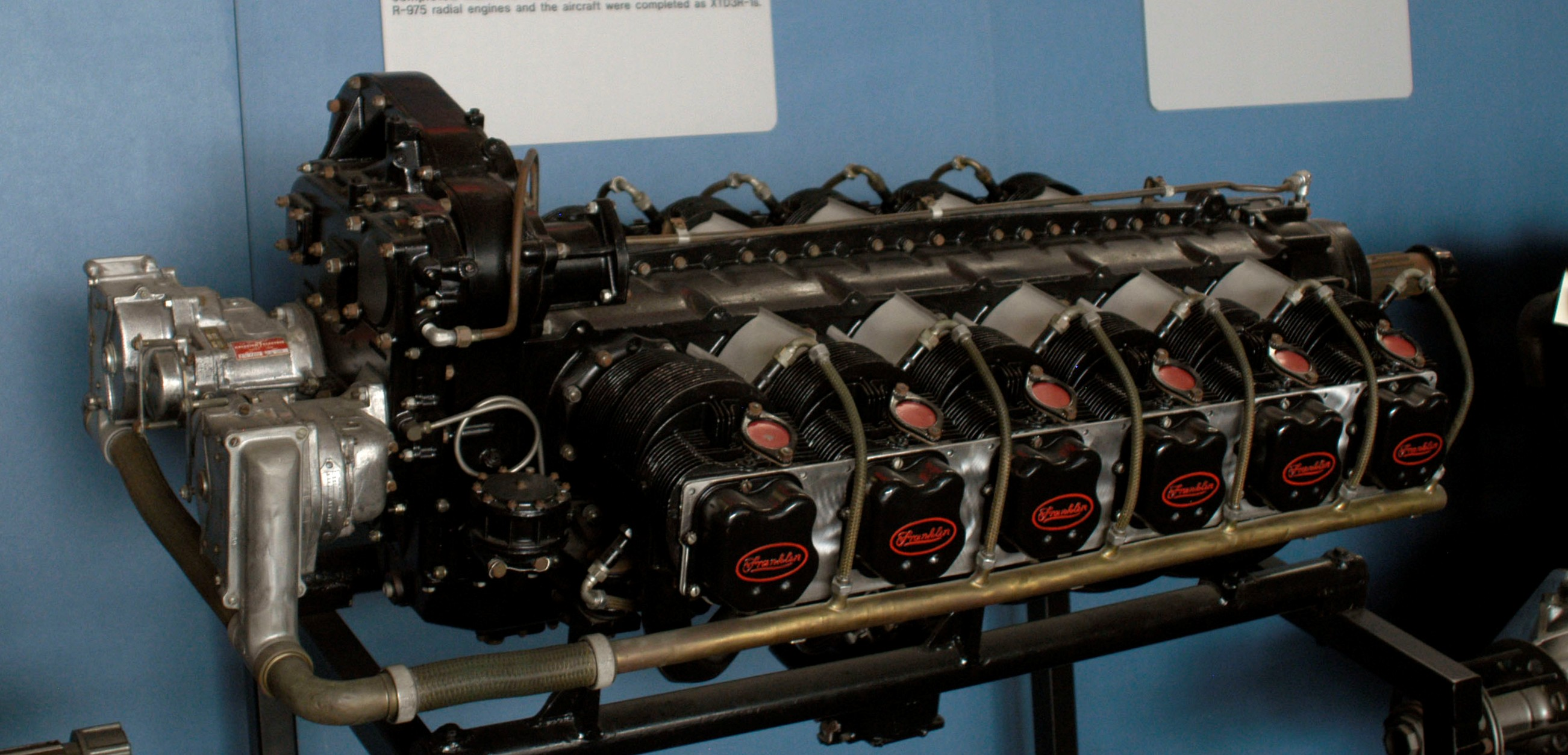
Franklin O-805

Model name	Configuration	Power
Franklin O-110	O2	45 hp
Franklin O-120	O2	60 hp
Franklin O-150	O4	40 hp
Franklin O-170	O4	60 hp
Franklin O-175	O4	80 hp
Franklin O-180	O4	80 hp
Franklin O-200	O4	65 hp
Franklin O-225	O4	75 hp
Franklin O-235	O4	125 hp
Franklin O-265	O6	110 hp
Franklin O-300	O6	130 hp
Franklin O-335	O6	225 hp
Franklin O-350	O6	235 hp
Franklin O-400	O8	235 hp
Franklin O-405	O6	200 hp
Franklin O-425	O6	240 hp
Franklin O-500	O6	215 hp
Franklin O-540	O8	300 hp
Franklin O-595	O12	300 hp
Franklin O-805	O12	450 hp

== See also ==
- Jacobs Aircraft Engine Company
- List of aircraft engine manufacturers
- List of aircraft engines
