= H. H. Franklin Manufacturing Company =

American die-cast manufacturing company

- Type: Die-cast Manufacturing
- Industry: Die-cast
- Genre: Die-cast bearings
- Founded: 1893
- Founder: Herbert H. Franklin
- Defunct: 1934
- Fate: Bankruptcy
- Headquarters: Syracuse, New York, United States
- Area served: United States
- Products: Bearings; Automotive parts
- Subsidiaries: Franklin Automobile Company; Franklin Die-casting Company

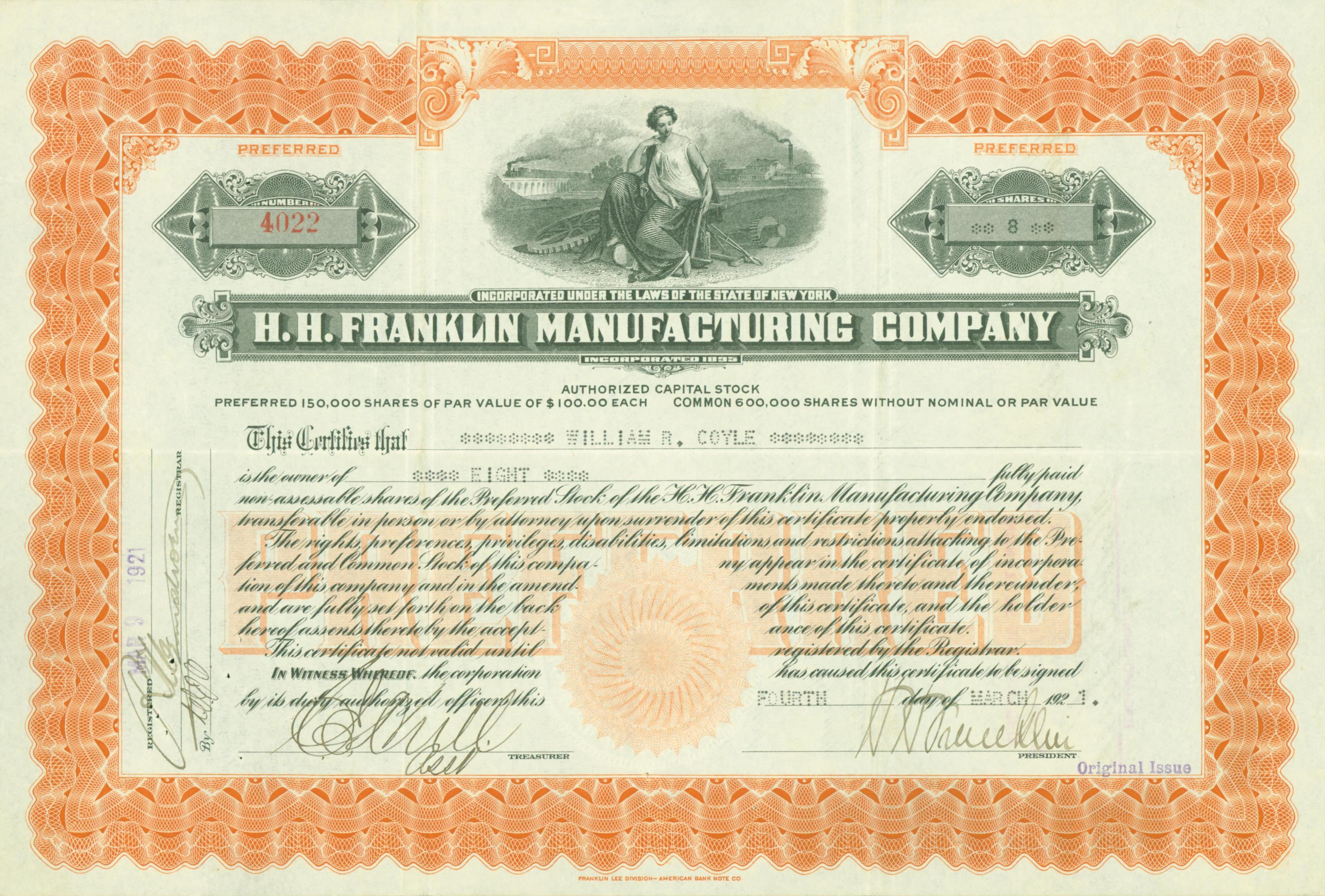
Share of the H. H. Franklin Manufacturing Company, issued 4. March 1921

H. H. Franklin Manufacturing Company was founded in 1893 by industrialist Herbert H. Franklin in Syracuse, New York. The company specialized in machine die casting and produced small parts such as gears and bearing caps. It was the first company in the world in that enterprise.

Franklin Manufacturing and its subsidiaries, except its aircraft engine branch, closed in 1934 due to bankruptcy.
