= Tucker: The Man and His Dream =

1988 film by Francis Ford Coppola

- Theatrical release poster
- Directed by: Francis Ford Coppola
- Written by: Arnold Schulman; David Seidler
- Produced by: Fred Fuchs; Fred Roos
- Starring: Jeff Bridges; Joan Allen; Martin Landau; Frederic Forrest; Mako; Dean Stockwell
- Narrated by: Bob Safford
- Cinematography: Vittorio Storaro
- Edited by: Priscilla Nedd-Friendly
- Music by: Joe Jackson
- Production companies: Lucasfilm Ltd. Zoetrope Studios
- Distributed by: Paramount Pictures
- Release date: August 12, 1988
- Running time: 110 minutes
- Country: United States
- Language: English
- Budget: $22–24 million
- Box office: $19.7 million

Tucker: The Man and His Dream is a 1988 American biographical film directed by Francis Ford Coppola, starring Jeff Bridges as automobile inventor Preston Tucker.

The film recounts Tucker's attempt to produce and market the innovative Tucker 48, which was met with scandal including pressure from the Big Three automobile manufacturers and accusations of stock fraud from the U.S. Securities and Exchange Commission. Joan Allen, Martin Landau, Elias Koteas, Frederic Forrest and Christian Slater appear in supporting roles. Landau was nominated for the Academy Award and won the Golden Globe Award for Best Supporting Actor.

In 1973, Coppola began development of a film based on the life of Tucker, originally with Marlon Brando in the lead role. Starting in 1976, Coppola planned Tucker to be both a musical and an experimental film with music and lyrics written by Leonard Bernstein, Betty Comden and Adolph Green. The project eventually collapsed when Coppola's American Zoetrope experienced financial problems. Tucker was revived in 1986 when Coppola's friend, George Lucas, joined as an executive producer.

Tucker: The Man and His Dream was released by Paramount Pictures on August 12, 1988. The film received positive reviews from critics, despite underperforming at the box office. Tucker: The Man and His Dream produced a spike in prices of Tucker 48s, as well as a renewed appreciation for Tucker and his automobiles.

== Plot ==
Detroit engineer Preston Tucker has been interested in building cars since childhood. During World War II he designed an armored car for the military and made money building gun turrets for aircraft in a small shop next to his home in Ypsilanti, Michigan. Tucker is supported by his large extended family, particularly his wife Vera, his sons Preston Jr. and Noble, and his daughter Marilyn Lee.

As the war winds down, Tucker becomes inspired to build the "car of the future". The "Tucker Torpedo" will feature revolutionary safety designs, including disc brakes, seatbelts, a pop-out windshield, and headlights which swivel when the car turns. Tucker hires young designer Alex Tremulis to help with the design and enlists New York financier Abe Karatz to arrange financial support. Raising the money through a stock issue, Tucker and Karatz acquire the enormous Dodge Chicago Plant to begin manufacturing. Abe hires Robert Bennington to run the new Tucker Corporation on a day-to-day basis.

Launching "the car of tomorrow" in a spectacular way, the Tucker Corporation is met with enthusiasm from shareholders and the general public. However, the Tucker board of directors, unsure of his ability to overcome the technical and financial obstacles ahead, send Tucker off on a publicity campaign and attempt to take complete control of the company. While Tucker travels the country, Bennington and directors change the design of the Tucker 48 to a more conventional design, eliminating the safety and engineering advances Tucker was advertising. At the same time, Tucker faces animosity from the Big Three automakers—General Motors, Ford and Chrysler—and from the authorities, led by Michigan Senator Homer S. Ferguson.

Tucker returns from his publicity tour and confronts Bennington, who curtly informs him that he no longer has any power in the company to make decisions, and that the engine originally planned for the car is not viable. Tucker then receives a call from Howard Hughes, who sends a private plane to bring Tucker to his aircraft manufacturing site. Hughes advises Tucker to purchase the Aircooled Motors Company, which can supply both the steel Tucker needs, as well as a small, powerful helicopter engine that might replace Tucker's original 589 power plant.

Unable to change Bennington's design, Tucker modifies the new engine and installs it in a test Tucker in the secrecy of his backyard tool-and-die shop. This prototype proves successful, both in durability and in crash-testing. However, Tucker is confronted with allegations of stock fraud. Ferguson's investigation with the U.S. Securities and Exchange Commission (SEC) causes Karatz—once convicted of bank fraud—to resign out of fear that his criminal record will prejudice the hearings. Yellow journalism all but ruins Tucker's public image, but the courtroom battle is resolved when he parades his entire production run of fifty Tucker 48s, proving that he has reached production status.

After giving a speech to the jurors on how capitalism in the United States is harmed by efforts of large corporations against small entrepreneurs like himself, Tucker is acquitted on all charges, but the Tucker Corporation falls into bankruptcy. In the film's closing shot, Tucker's entire production line—fifty "cars of the future"—is driven through the streets of downtown Chicago, admired by everyone as they pass.

=== Epilogue ===
Preston Tucker died of lung cancer six years after the trial. Although only 50 Tucker 48s were ever produced, 46 of them remained roadworthy and in use as of 1988.

All of Tucker's innovations— aerodynamic styling, padded dash, pop-out windows, seatbelts, fuel injection, and disc brakes— were gradually adopted by larger automakers and are found in nearly all modern cars today.

== Cast ==
- Jeff Bridges as Preston Tucker
- Joan Allen as Vera Tucker
- Martin Landau as Abe Karatz
- Elias Koteas as Alex Tremulis
- Frederic Forrest as Eddie Dean
- Christian Slater as Preston Tucker, Jr.
- Don Novello as Stan
- Nina Siemaszko as Marilyn Lee Tucker
- Mako as Jimmy Sakuyama
- Dean Stockwell as Howard Hughes
- Lloyd Bridges as Senator Homer Ferguson (uncredited)
- Anders Johnson as Johnny
- Corin Nemec as Noble Tucker (credited as Corky Nemec)
- Marshall Bell as Frank
- Jay O. Sanders as Kirby
- Peter Donat as Otto Kerner
- Dean Goodman as Bennington / Drew Pearson's Voice
- John X. Heart as Ferguson's Agent
- Patti Austin as Millie
- Sandy Bull as Stan's Assistant
- Joe Miksak as Judge Igoe (as Joseph Miksak)
- Scott Beach as Floyd Cerf
- Roland Scrivner as Oscar Beasley
- Bob Safford as Narrator (voice)
- Lawrence Menkin as "Doc" (credited as Larry Menkin)
- Ron Close as Fritz
- Joe Flood as "Dutch"
- Leonard Gardner as Gas Station Owner
- Bill Bonham as Garage Owner
- Abigail Van Alyn as Ferguson's Secretary #1
- Taylor Gilbert as Ferguson's Secretary #2
- David Booth as Man in Hall
- Jessie Nelson as Woman on Steps
- Al Hart as Newscaster (voice)
- Cab Covay as Security Guard
- James Cranna as Man in Audience
- Bill Reddick as Board Member
- Ed Loerke as Mayor
- Jay Jacobus as Head Engineer
- Anne Lawder as Bennington's Secretary
- Jeanette Lana Sartain as Singing Girl
- Mary Buffett as Singing Girl
- Annie Stocking as Singing Girl
- Michael McShane as Recording Engineer (Note: Tucker: The Man and His Dream marked comic and actor Michael McShane's film debut.)
- Hope Alexander-Willis as Tucker's Secretary #1
- Taylor Young as Tucker's Secretary #2
- Jim Giovanni as Police Sergeant
- Joe Lerer as Reporter at Trial
- Morgan Upton as Ingram
- Ken Grantham as SEC Agent
- Mark Anger as Blue
- Al Nalbandian as Jury Foreman
- Brian Storey as Doorman (uncredited)

== Background ==
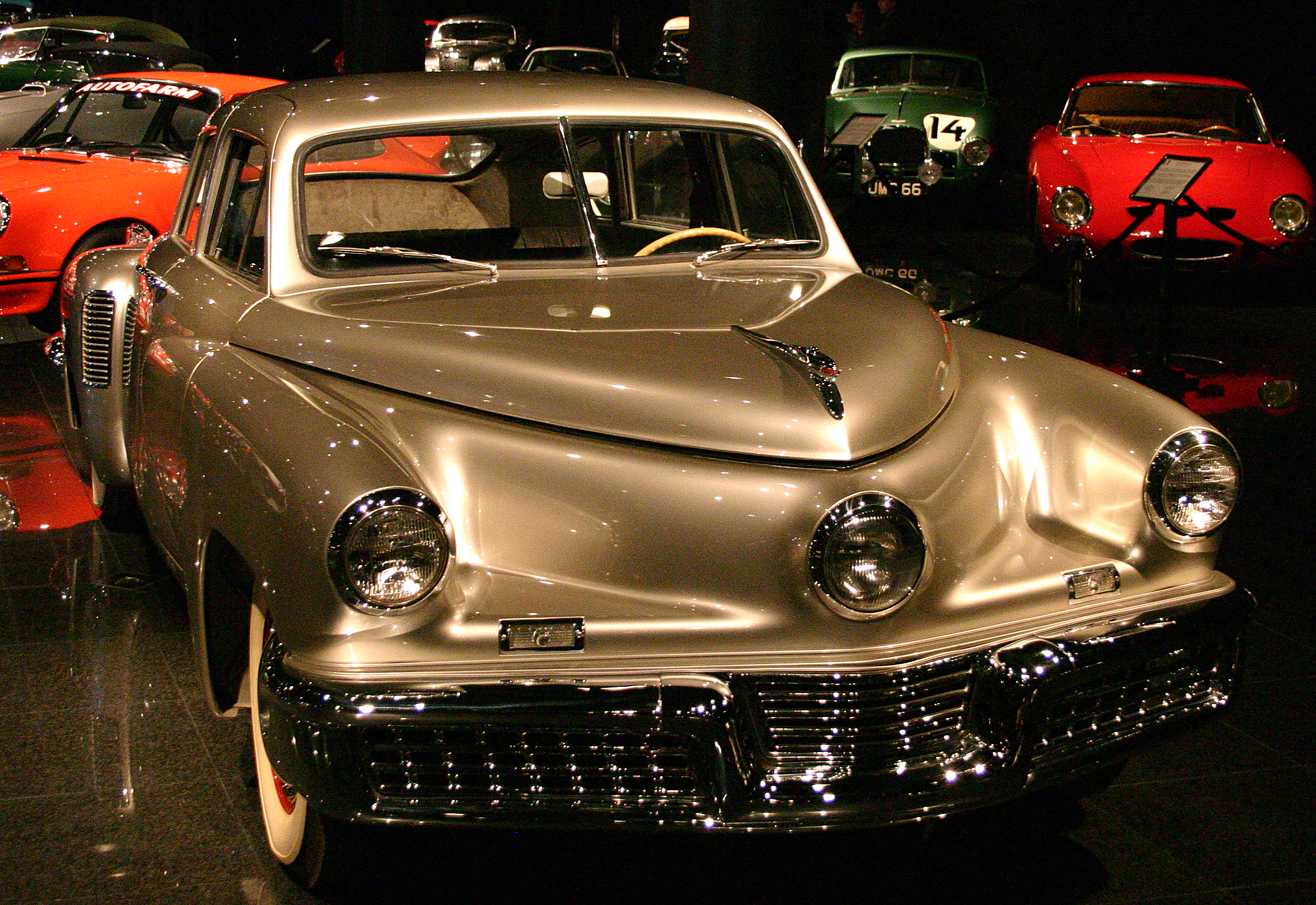
A 1948 Tucker Sedan at the Blackhawk Museum

From childhood, Coppola envisioned a film about the Tucker automobile and while attending the UCLA School of Theater, Film and Television in the early 1960s, further refined a film concept based on the life of Preston Tucker. In June 1973, during the filming of The Godfather Part II (1974), Coppola announced his intention to start development at American Zoetrope as writer, producer and director. He had already approached Marlon Brando for the lead role. He then purchased the rights from the Tucker Estate in 1976, and, in addition to Brando, discussed the leading role with Jack Nicholson and also considered Burt Reynolds. Taking inspiration from Citizen Kane (1941), Kabuki theater and the work of Bertolt Brecht, Coppola initially planned to make Tucker as a "dark kind of musical". He later said that the idea approximated the style of an experimental film, similar to Mishima: A Life in Four Chapters (1985), which he produced.

The musical would have featured Tucker predominantly, but storylines would have interwoven Thomas Edison, Henry Ford, Harvey Samuel Firestone and Andrew Carnegie as supporting characters. Leonard Bernstein agreed to write the music, and Betty Comden and Adolph Green were hired to write the lyrics. They all spent a week at Coppola's home in California, planning the musical which resulted in Bernstein writing one song. Coppola also approached Gene Kelly as a consultant for the dance choreography. However, financing for Tucker fell through when Coppola's production company, American Zoetrope, filed for bankruptcy after the box office failures of One from the Heart (1982) and The Cotton Club (1984). Coppola abandoned Tucker for the time being and went to work on Peggy Sue Got Married (1986).

In 1986, during the production of Captain EO (1986), Coppola's friend George Lucas encouraged him to revive development for Tucker, believing it to be "the best film Francis had ever been involved with". In addition, Lucas agreed to serve as executive producer and offered the use of his filmmaking companies, Lucasfilm and Industrial Light & Magic. He also convinced Coppola to drop the musical idea in favor of doing a homage to the films of Frank Capra, especially Mr. Smith Goes to Washington (1939). Coppola became interested in the American Dream aspect of the storyline, as well as post-World War II capitalism and politics. At one point, Coppola approached Capra to produce the film with Lucas, however, Capra thought Tucker was a failure and Coppola dropped that plan.

Coppola originally intended to write the screenplay himself, but due to his commitment to the filming of Gardens of Stone (1987), engaged Arnold Schulman who scripted Capra's A Hole in the Head (1959). Schulman was angered when screenwriter David Seidler, who'd been previously attached to the project, was granted a co-writing credit by the WGA, stating: "Believe me, I was pissed off about the credit grabbing on Tucker. I'm still pissed off. That is one instance where every word of the script is mine." Coppola was also displeased by Seidler's credit, stating: "They gave a credit to a writer who had nothing to do with the script that I used." The filmmakers devised a $24 million production budget, but Universal Pictures, Walt Disney Pictures, TriStar Pictures and Paramount Pictures wanted Coppola and Lucas to lower it to $15 million. Distributors were also dubious about working with Lucas after the 1986 commercial and critical failures of both Labyrinth and Howard the Duck. Lucas decided to cover the $24 million budget himself, and pre-production proceeded.

== Production ==
Development and production for Tucker: The Man and His Dream included the involvement of Tucker's children and grandchildren. Jeff Bridges was cast in the title role and, for research, studied Preston Tucker's mannerisms and movements through home movies. Tucker's descendants also granted Bridges the opportunity to sport the man's black pearl ring and cuff links for his wardrobe. Preston's son, John Tucker, said that Bridges has "got it all in the mannerisms and the look. My father was very positive, always thinking of what came next. Jeff captures that." Martin Landau was enthusiastic about accepting the pivotal role of Abe Karatz as a means to avoid typecasting. The construct of family values played a crucial role in the Tuckers' life and Coppola studiously selected Joan Allen for the part of Vera, Tucker's devoted wife while Christian Slater and Elias Koteas fill in the other central roles of eldest son and Tucker's friend and confederate, Alex Tremulis. Coppola's family was undergoing a stressful time during the production and he dedicated the film to Gio, his eldest son, who died before filming began.

Principal photography started with first unit shooting on April 13, 1987, in the Ford Motor Company Assembly Plant in Richmond, California, doubling for the Dodge Chicago Plant. The majority of outdoor filming took place in Marin County, California, as well as various locations including Oakland, Novato, and San Francisco. Forty-seven of the original 51 Tucker '48s still exist, and many are in excellent condition. Twenty-one of the cars were borrowed from members of the Tucker Automobile Club of America and were extensively used as both "set dressing" and in starring roles. Three cars were used to film the crash scene, a "before" version, with a fiberglass body, the car used to do the actual rollover was a Studebaker modified to look like a Tucker (this car is currently in a privately owned museum in Tallahassee, Florida), and an "after crash" version which was another fiberglass body fitted to a Ford LTD chassis. The production is notable as the first film to have audio mixing work done at Lucas's Skywalker Ranch. Production wrapped on July 17, 1987, and in the following month, Lucas convinced Paramount Pictures to distribute the film and cover the majority of the budget. He was helped by the fact that the studio was distributing Lucasfilm's forthcoming Indiana Jones and the Last Crusade (1989) and courting Coppola to direct The Godfather Part III (1990). Prior to final editing, the studio insisted on amplifying the title to Tucker: The Man and His Dream.

== Historical accuracy ==
Coppola had a certain amount of personal affinity with the short-lived legacy of Preston Tucker. His father, Carmine Coppola, had been one of the original investors in Tucker stock and purchased one of the cars off the production line. Coppola included the involvement of Preston Tucker's children, grandchildren and members of the Tucker Estate during the development of Tucker in the late 1970s, as well as during filming in 1987. Coppola and Lucas acknowledged that they purposely intended to portray Tucker in an entirely sympathetic way. Both filmmakers each owned two Tuckers, although Lucas eventually sold one of his cars in September 2005 for $385,500. The Tucker Automobile Club made up of a legion of Tucker owners and collectors pronounced in their trade journal, TACA, that the "basic theme of the movie is quite accurate..." although "the film compresses time and often takes artistic license with facts in order to more effectively present the story".

Anahid Nazarian, Coppola's librarian, spoke of the historical inaccuracies. "Preston Tucker didn't really have an assembly line; there's one in the film. He actually had five kids; there are only four in the film. Our story takes place in one year; the real story took place over four years. People who know the story will find a lot of what they call errors. I'm sure I'll be deluged with letters." Nazarian's research, collected over several years, consisted of books, some 350 articles, interviews with the Tucker family, hundreds of photographs, home movies and information from the Tucker Automobile Club of America, whom the production company considered important arbiters of the Tucker mystique. "We knew the facts", she continued, "but to fit the spirit of the story in a film that is exciting and has characters you love and characters you hate – that made us change a lot of things. Things like the president of the Tucker Company was a good guy really, but we needed a villain, so we made him a villain." Alex Tremulis, who served as one of the historical consultants during production, is depicted as the chief car designer of the Tucker Torpedo rather than as the stylist, and the film ignores the involvement of designer Philip Egan.

== Reception ==
=== Box office ===
Tucker: The Man and His Dream was released in the United States on August 12, 1988, earning $3,709,562 in its opening weekend in 720 theaters. The film eventually grossed $19.65 million in US totals and was declared a box office bomb because it did not reimburse its $24 million production budget, despite positive reviews. It later became a cult classic for years to come.

=== Critical reception ===
On Rotten Tomatoes the film has an approval rating of 82% based on 49 reviews, with an average rating of 7.2/10. The site's critical consensus reads, "Though it may not be as comprehensive as some would like, Francis Ford Coppola's cheerful biopic of the failed automotive designer features sparkling direction and a strong central performance from Jeff Bridges." On Metacritic the film has a weighted average score of 74 out of 100, based on 13 critics, indicating "generally favorable reviews". Audiences surveyed by CinemaScore gave the film an average grade "A" on an A+ to F scale.

Richard Schickel of Time magazine praised the film for its exaggerated kitsch style. He also believed the role of Preston Tucker to be Jeff Bridges' best performance. Janet Maslin from The New York Times agreed, writing that Coppola, known for his dark approach on his previous films, "found the directorial range to actually make a feel-good movie". In addition, Desson Thomson, writing in The Washington Post, called the film a "satisfying commercial breakthrough for Coppola" and praised the cinematography of Vittorio Storaro, as well as the ubiquitous approach for Dean Stockwell's cameo appearance as Howard Hughes. Roger Ebert gave a mixed review. "Preston Tucker lacks an ounce of common sense or any notion of the real odds against him. And since the movie never really deals with that – never really comes to grips with Tucker's character – it begins as a saga but ends in whimsy."

Although Coppola enjoyed his working relationship with Lucas, he commented in a July 1988 The New York Times interview with Robert Lindsey that "I think it's a good movie - it's eccentric, a little wacky, like the Tucker car – but it's not the movie I would have made at the height of my power." Coppola was able to stoically accept the critical and commercial reaction to Tucker: The Man and His Dream. "Every time in my career I tried to make, dare I say it, an art film, it never did well."

Despite helming his "labor of love", Coppola was insistent that Tucker: The Man and His Dream would be his last Hollywood project. He reiterated a long-held dream of his own, embarking on a "period of amateurism and experimentation as a Hollywood dropout". One unexpected effect of the film's release was a renewed interest in the Tucker automobile and a boost in the collector's value of the Tucker 48; in a 2008 auction, a low-mileage example topped the $1 million mark.

=== Awards and nominations ===
| Award | Category | Nominee(s) | Result |
|---|---|---|---|
| Academy Awards | Best Supporting Actor | Martin Landau | Nominated |
| Academy Awards | Best Art Direction | Dean Tavoularis and Armin Ganz | Nominated |
| Academy Awards | Best Costume Design | Milena Canonero | Nominated |
| Artios Awards | Outstanding Achievement in Feature Film Casting – Drama | Jane Jenkins and Janet Hirshenson (also for Mystic Pizza) | Nominated |
| Belgian Film Critics Association Awards | Grand Prix | | Nominated |
| Boston Society of Film Critics Awards | Best Supporting Actor | Dean Stockwell (also for Married to the Mob) | Won |
| British Academy Film Awards | Best Production Design | Dean Tavoularis | Won |
| Chicago Film Critics Association Awards | Best Supporting Actor | Martin Landau | Won |
| Golden Globe Awards | Best Supporting Actor – Motion Picture | Martin Landau | Won |
| Grammy Awards | Best Album of Original Instrumental Background Score Written for a Motion Picture or Television | Joe Jackson | Nominated |
| Kansas City Film Critics Circle Awards | Best Supporting Actor | Martin Landau | Won (Note: Tied with Tom Cruise for Rain Man and Dean Stockwell for Married to the Mob.) |
| Los Angeles Film Critics Association Awards | Best Supporting Actor | Martin Landau | Runner-up |
| Nastro d'Argento Awards | Best Costume Design | Milena Canonero | Won |
| National Board of Review Awards | Top Ten Films | | 6th Place |
| National Society of Film Critics Awards | Best Supporting Actor | Dean Stockwell (also for Married to the Mob) | Won |
| National Society of Film Critics Awards | Best Cinematography | Vittorio Storaro | 3rd Place |
| New York Film Critics Circle Awards | Best Supporting Actor | Martin Landau | Runner-up |
| New York Film Critics Circle Awards | Best Supporting Actor | Dean Stockwell (also for Married to the Mob) | Won |

== Home media ==
Pocket Books published a novelization written by Robert Tine to coincide with the release of the film. Paramount Home Video released Tucker: The Man and His Dream on DVD in October 2000, which included audio commentary by Coppola, the 1948 promotional film Tucker: The Man and the Car (with optional commentary by Coppola), as well as a making-of featurette, Under the Hood: Making Tucker.

Disney acquired the rights to the film via their acquisition of Lucasfilm in 2012. To celebrate the film's 30th anniversary, Lionsgate Home Entertainment released a high-definition remaster of the film on Blu-ray under license from Disney in 2018.
