= Tucker armored car =

WWII American prototype

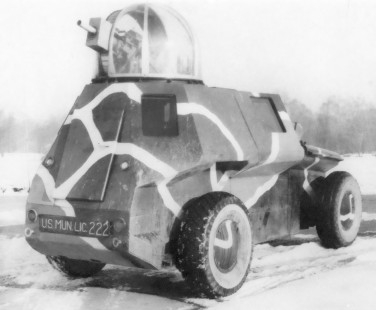

Among the initiatives of American industrialist Preston Tucker during World War II was the Tucker armored car (also known as the Tucker Tiger Tank even though it was not a tank).

Some prototypes of the high-speed armored car were tested, but no operational models were ordered. The vehicle was designed with a very powerful V12 engine, so it could travel at 114 miles per hour (183 km/h) on road and 78 miles per hour (126 km/h) off road. The vehicle was conceived as being armed with a primary armament of a 37-millimetre (1.5 in) anti-aircraft gun capable of firing 120 rounds per minute, mounted in an aircraft-style spherical gun turret. The turret would have been supplemented by hull-mounted machine guns on production vehicles. The vehicle was promoted as being so fast it would chase aircraft, allowing it to hit them with more rounds than fixed gun batteries or slower vehicles.

Long after the war, when Tucker faced the Securities and Exchange Commission, Tucker's press agents produced a highly-colored half-hour film entitled Tucker: The Man and his Car for the Commission members. This film implied that the Tucker armored car and the Tucker gun turret, which were never operational weapons, had been important weapons in World War II. Steve Lehto and Jay Leno, who worked to debunk misconceptions about Tucker's career and importance during World War II, attribute the misconceptions to Tucker's promotional movie.
