= Eugene Bordinat =

American Automotive Designer, Executive

Eugene Bordinat Jr.
- Born: February 10, 1920; Toledo, Ohio
- Died: August 11, 1987 (aged 67); Wayne, Michigan
- Education: Cranbrook Academy of Art and University of Michigan
- Occupations: Automotive designer, Automotive Executive
- Employer(s): General Motors, Ford Motor Company

Eugene 'Gene' Bordinat Jr. (February 10, 1920 – August 11, 1987) was an American automobile designer and corporate executive.

He was noted as the outspoken Vice President of Styling and Chief Designer at Ford Motor Company in a career spanning more than three decades with the company and the tenure of five company presidents, leaving "his imprint on more than 50 million cars."

Bordinat arrived at Ford as the 1949 line was under design, and ultimately guided the design of cars ranging from the Lincoln Continental (1958–1960), Falcon, Mustang, Maverick, Pinto and the Lincoln Continental Mark V. He was noted for often correcting the historical record on the original Mustang noting that Lee Iacocca was not the "Father of the Mustang," that the Mustang design was seven months complete when Iacocca first saw it.

On Bordinat's death in 1987, noted automotive journalist Paul Lienert described him as "urbane and polished" with a "droll wit and near photographic memory", and a "masterful manipulator, of the press, of his own designers, even of his superiors."

Bordinat himself once said "beauty is a good 10-day sales report" and (of his work in the 1950s) "people wanted chrome, and we slathered them with it. Good taste has nothing to do with it whatsoever."

== Background ==
Bordinat (pronounced bor-deen-uh') was born on 10 February 1920 in Toledo, Ohio, to Maud Agnes Hogan Bordinat (1896–1987) and Eugene Bordinat (1891–1985), who had been an engineering graduate of Rensselaer Polytechnic Institute and plant engineer for Willys-Overland.

Bordinat attended high school in the Detroit Area, and studied at the Cranbrook Academy of Art and the University of Michigan as an art major.

He was a member of the Industrial Designers Society of America from its founding in 1965, and ultimately a fellow. He received the Automotive Hall of Fame Distinguished Service Citation Award in 1977 and an honorary degree from the Art Center of Los Angeles.

In his retirement he wrote a manuscript for a light-hearted autobiography titled My Days at the Court of Henry II, with an inside view to his years at Ford and specifically with Henry Ford II.

Though it had been finished and accepted, the book was under editing at the time of his death to accommodate a more "anti-Iacocca slant" as suggested by the publisher, of which Bordinat approved. Although his widow had intended to finish his autobiography, it was never published.

Bordinat died suddenly of an undiagnosed lung ailment at the Henry Ford Hospital on August 11, 1987, survived by two brothers, Philip Bordinat (1922–2007) and Hugh David Bordinat (1929–2021), and his wife Teresa Simmons Bordinat. Bordinat had been previously married to Eleanor Louis Merritt Bordinat (1918–1976) with whom he had one daughter, Janice Eleanore Bordinat Delaney. He was subsequently married to Edelgard L. Bordinat (died 1983).

== Career ==
In 1939, at the end of his Freshman year at the University of Michigan, Bordinat took a summer position with General Motors. He was one of 33 students chosen to join GM's Art and Colour Section under Harley Earl.

In a 1984 interview, Bordinat related the story of his joining General Motors:

"In 1936, I went to the University of Michigan, and after being there for two years --a little over two years--, I was informed of a school that was starting at General Motors. They were having difficulty in getting fellows, then known as stylists, because there were very few schools that were teaching any of that kind of work --even industrial design--, which bears on auto design. As a result, they decided to start this school which was the brain child of Harley Earl, who was then the Vice-President of the Styling Section at General Motors and was working directly for [Chairman] Alfred P. Sloan at the time. The school was unusual in a sense. They selected thirty-three people from throughout the country. They had to submit samples and references and the normal things, and I was fortunate to be one of the thirty-three people. The group was unusual in that nobody had any experience in automobile design, but they had demonstrated a love for cars, were able to put together their concepts of cars for their samples and brought, of course, their other samples which were in the fields that they'd been in, such as shoe design, industrial design, dress design."

During World War II he served as a supervisor at Fisher Body for tank production. He later served in the United States Army Air Forces. Bordinat briefly returned to work at GM as a senior stylist after the war.

Bordinat joined Ford in 1947. He supervised styling at the Lincoln-Mercury division, directing many automotive designs. Bordinat was promoted to vice president for styling and a chief designer in 1961, as the successor to George W. Walker. At his peak, Bordinat supervised Ford's annual $30 Million design budget, with a discretionary budget of $12 Million.

Less than a year after suffering a heart attack, Bordinat took a leave of absence at 60 per cent pay following his 60th birthday in February 1980. As the longest-tenured chief stylist in the company's history, he fully retired in 1985. Ford subsequently restructured its design studio, announcing Jack Telnack would assume major design responsibilities.

== Bordinat Cobra ==
In the early 1960s Bordinat worked with McKinley Thompson, the first major African-American car designer at Ford, to create an alternate version of one of its second generation of "X Cars," its most futuristic concepts, the Cougar II coupe.

In this case the alternative would be sporty open-top sports car, alternatively called the XD Cobra or the Bordinat Cobra: intended as a possible update to the two-seat Shelby Cobra. presented the concept at the 1963 Detroit Auto Show as well as the 1964 New York World's Fair, and reportedly allowed Bordinat to use the two-seater as his personal car for more than a year.

The fate of the Bordinat Cobra and Cougar II coupe remained largely unknown, until 2004, when a retired Ford designer, Jeff Burgy, tracked down their whereabouts, in storage at the Detroit Historical Museum.

== Notes ==
- David L. Lewis (2005). 100 Years of Ford. Publications International, Inc. ISBN 0-7853-7988-6.
- "EUGENE BORDINAT Jr". The New York Times. August 14, 1987.
- IDSA page on Eugene Bordinat
