= Preston Tucker =

American automobile entrepreneur

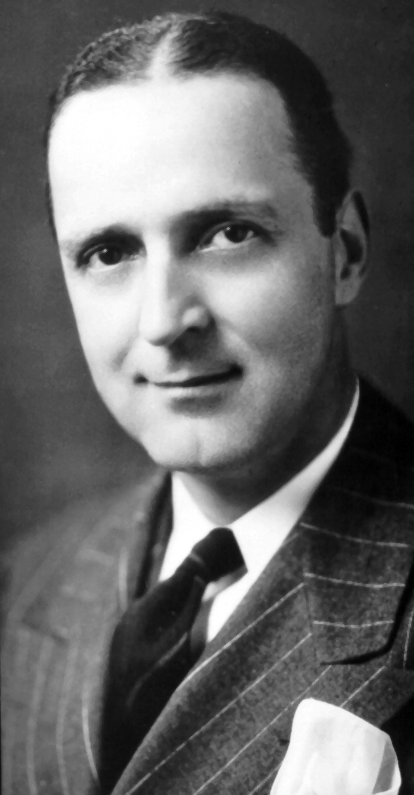
- Born: Preston Thomas Tucker; September 21, 1903; Capac, Michigan, U.S.
- Died: December 26, 1956 (aged 53); Ypsilanti, Michigan, U.S.
- Known for: Tucker 48, Tucker Combat Car, Tucker Gun Turret, Tucker Aviation Corporation, Franklin Engine Company/Air Cooled Motors.
- Spouse: Vera A. Fuqua (m. 1923)
- Children: 5

Preston Thomas Tucker (21 September 1903 – 26 December 1956) was an American automobile entrepreneur who developed the innovative Tucker 48 sedan, initially nicknamed the "Tucker Torpedo", an automobile which introduced many features that have since become widely used in modern cars.

Production of the Tucker '48 was shut down on 3 March 1949 amid scandal and controversial accusations of stock fraud, of which Tucker was eventually acquitted. The 1988 movie Tucker: The Man and His Dream is based on Tucker's spirit and the saga surrounding the car's production.

== Early life (1903–1933) ==
Preston Tucker was born on September 21, 1903, on a peppermint farm near Capac, Michigan. His father was a railroad engineer named Shirl Harvey Tucker (1880–1907), and his mother was Lucille Caroline (née Preston) Tucker (1881–1960). He grew up outside Detroit in the suburb of Lincoln Park, Michigan. Tucker was raised by his mother, a teacher, after his father died of appendicitis when Preston was three years old.

First learning to drive at age 11, Tucker was obsessed with automobiles from an early age. At age 16, Preston Tucker began purchasing late model automobiles, repairing and refurbishing them to sell for a profit. He attended the Cass Technical High School in Detroit, but he quit school and landed a job as an office boy for the Cadillac Motor Company, where he used roller skates to make his rounds more efficiently. In 1922, young Tucker joined the Lincoln Park Police Department against the pleas of his mother, his interest stirred by his desire to drive and ride the fast, high-performance police cars and motorcycles. His mother had him removed from the LPPD, pointing out to police officials that at 19, he was below the department's minimum required age.

Tucker and his new wife, Vera, whom he married in 1923, then took over a six-month lease on a gas station near Lincoln Park, running the station together. Vera would run the station during the day while Preston worked on the Ford Motor Company assembly line. After the lease ran out, Tucker quit Ford and returned to the LPPD, but in his first winter back he was banned from driving police vehicles after using a blowtorch to cut a hole in the dashboard of a cruiser to allow engine heat to warm the cabin.

During the last couple of months at the gas station, Tucker began selling Studebaker cars on the side. He met an automobile salesman, Michael Dulian, who later became sales manager for the Tucker Corporation. Dulian hired Tucker as a car salesman at his Detroit dealership. Tucker did very well, but the dealership was a long drive from his Lincoln Park home and so Tucker quit and briefly returned to the LPPD for the last time. A few months later, Dulian, still impressed with Tucker's immediate success as a salesman, invited Tucker to move south with him to Memphis, Tennessee, to work as a sales manager. Dulian was transferred a couple of years later, but Tucker stayed in Memphis and was a salesman for Ivor Schmidt (Stutz) and John T. Fisher Motor Company (Chrysler), where he became general sales manager. While managing Chrysler sales in Memphis, Tucker made a connection with Pierce-Arrow. In 1933, Tucker moved to Buffalo, New York, and became regional sales manager for Pierce-Arrow automobiles, but after only two years, he moved back to Detroit and worked as a Dodge salesman for Cass Motor Sales.

== Auto racing and the Indianapolis 500 (1932–1939) ==
During the early 1930s, Tucker began an annual one-month trek to the Indianapolis Motor Speedway. Having a strong interest in the race cars and their designers, Tucker met Harry Miller, maker of more Indianapolis 500-winning engines than any other during this period. Tucker moved to Indianapolis to be closer to the racing car development scene and worked as the transportation manager for a beer distributor, overseeing the fleet of delivery trucks for the company.

A better engineer than businessman, Miller declared bankruptcy in 1933 and was looking for new opportunities. Tucker persuaded Miller to join him in building race cars, and they formed "Miller and Tucker, Inc." in 1935. The company's first job was building 10 souped-up Ford V-8 racers for Henry Ford. However, the time to develop and test the cars was insufficient, and the steering boxes on all entrants overheated and locked up, causing them to drop out of the race. The design was later perfected by privateers, with examples running at Indy through 1948. Miller and Tucker, Inc. continued race car development and various other ventures until Miller's death in 1943. Tucker was close friends with Miller and even helped Miller's widow pay for her husband's funeral costs. While working with Miller, Tucker met the Chevrolet brothers and chief mechanic/engineer John Eddie Offutt, who would later help Tucker develop and build the first prototype of the Tucker 48. Tucker's outgoing personality and his involvement at Indianapolis made him well known in the automotive industry by 1939.

== Tucker Combat Car and the Tucker Gun Turret (1939–1941) ==
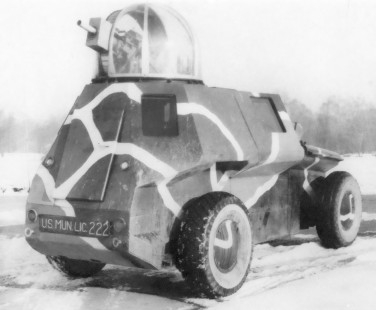
The Tucker armored combat car. Note the Tucker Turret.

In late 1937, while recovering in an Indianapolis hospital from an appendectomy, Tucker was reading the news and, learning of looming war in Europe, he got the idea of developing a high-speed armored combat vehicle. In 1939, Tucker moved his family back to Michigan and bought a house and property in Ypsilanti. He remodeled an old barn on his property and began and operated a machine shop called the Ypsilanti Machine and Tool Company, planning to use the facility to develop various automotive products.

Opportunity arose for Tucker from the Netherlands, whose government wanted a combat vehicle suited to the muddy Dutch terrain. Continuing his working relationship with Harry Miller, Tucker began designing the Tucker armored car, nicknamed the "Tucker Tiger", a short-wheelbase armored car powered by a Miller-modified Packard V-12 engine.

External videos
- Video from Deadliest Tech

At least one prototype of the combat car was built. Production of the car was to be done at the Rahway, New Jersey, factory owned by the American Armament Corporation. The Germans invaded the Netherlands in the spring of 1940 before Tucker could complete the deal, and the Dutch government-in-exile lost interest, so he completed the prototypes and opted to try to sell the vehicle to the United States Armed Forces. The car is said to have reached 100 mph (161 km/h), far in excess of the design specifications. The U.S. military rejected the Combat Car, as they felt the vehicle was too fast, and had already committed to other combat vehicles. However, the highly mobile, power-operated gun turret featured on the Combat Car, the "Tucker Turret", earned the interest of the United States Navy. Harry Miller would later take some of the designs from the Tucker Combat Car to American Bantam, where he was involved in the development of the first Jeep.

The Tucker Turret was soon in production (initially at Tucker's Ypsilanti machine shop). Though the turret is often reported to have been used widely on bombers, like the B-17 and B-29, it was actually developed for the Douglas B-18 Bolo. In the end, no Tucker turrets were equipped on any bombers. Tucker's patent and royalty rights were confiscated by the U.S. and Tucker was embroiled in lawsuits for years trying to recoup royalties for use of his patents on the turret.

== Tucker Aviation Corporation and Higgins-Tucker Aviation (1941–1943) ==
In 1940, Tucker formed the Tucker Aviation Corporation, with the goal of manufacturing aircraft and marine engines. The corporation (Tucker's first) was initially based at his shop behind his Michigan home. A public corporation with stock certificates issued, Tucker raised enough to develop the design for a fighter aircraft, the Tucker XP-57, which earned the interest of the United States Army Air Corps (USAAC). Development of a single prototype of the XP-57 was started, powered by a straight 8-cylinder engine developed and influenced by Harry Miller, called the Miller L-510. Nicknamed the "Peashooter", this fighter competed for WWII government war contracts. However, financial problems within the company slowed the development of the prototype and the USAAC allowed the contract to lapse.

During World War II, Tucker became associated with Andrew Jackson Higgins of Higgins Industries, builder of Liberty ships, PT boats, and landing craft. Higgins acquired Tucker Aviation Corporation in March 1942, and Tucker moved to New Orleans, Louisiana, to serve as a vice-president of Higgins Industries, specifically in charge of the Higgins-Tucker Aviation division. This entity was to produce gun turrets, armament, and engines for Higgins' torpedo boats. However, this relationship did not work out and Tucker severed his association with Higgins in 1943. Go referred to Preston Tucker as "The world's greatest salesman. When he turns those big brown eyes on you, you'd better watch out!"

After 1943, Tucker moved back to Michigan, intending to start his own auto company, the Tucker Corporation.

== Tucker Corporation and the 1948 Tucker Sedan (1944–1947) ==
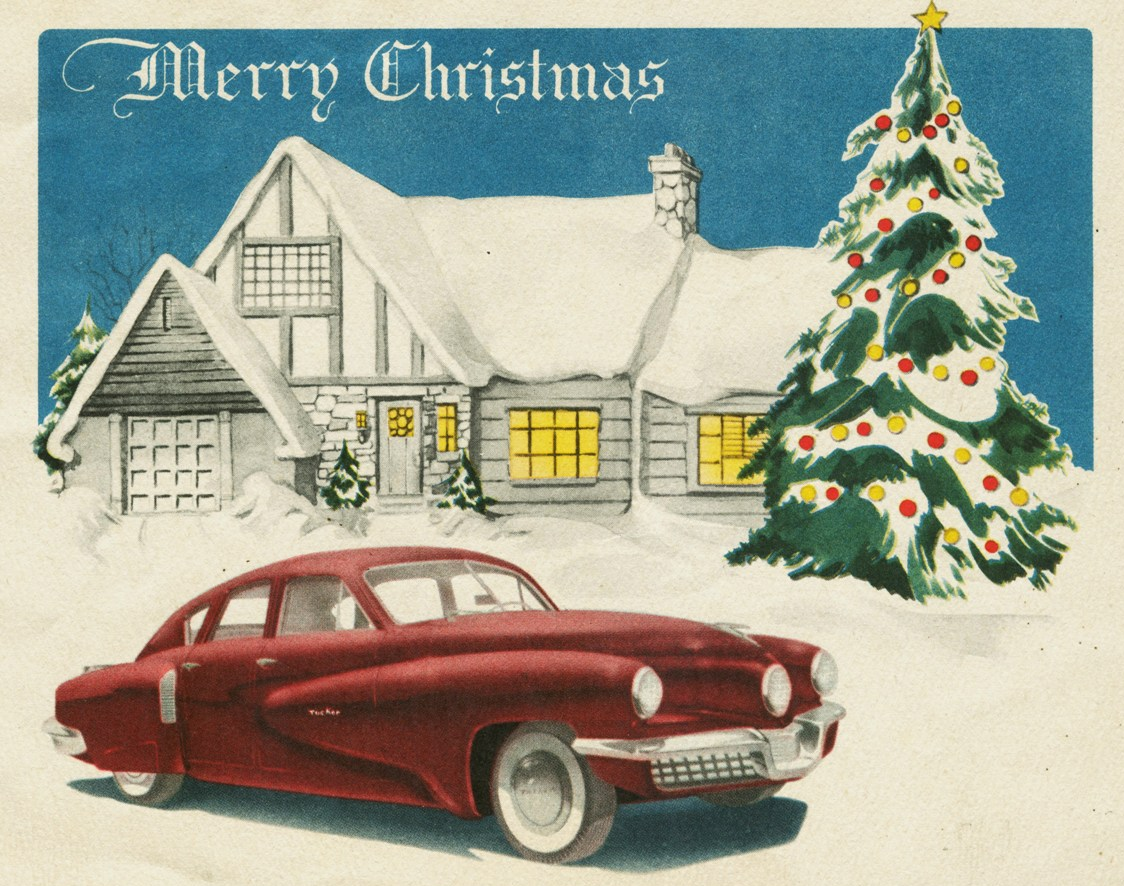
Tucker Corporation Christmas Card, 1947. The card illustrates the basic design of the 1948 Tucker, but with non-production trim.

After the war, the public was ready for new car designs, but the Big Three automakers had not developed any new models since 1941, and were in no hurry to introduce them. That provided great opportunities for new small, independent automakers who could develop new cars more rapidly than the huge legacy automakers. Tucker saw his opportunity to develop and bring his "car of tomorrow" to market. Studebaker was first with an all-new postwar model, but Tucker took a different tack, designing a safety-oriented car with innovative features and modern styling.

Tucker's first design appeared in Science Illustrated magazine in December 1946, showing a futuristic version of the car with a hydraulic drive system designed by George Lawson, along with a photo of a 1/8 scale model blown up to appear full sized, titled the "Torpedo on Wheels". That was only an early rendering of the proposal, with its design features yet to meet reality, but the motoring public was now excited about the Tucker.

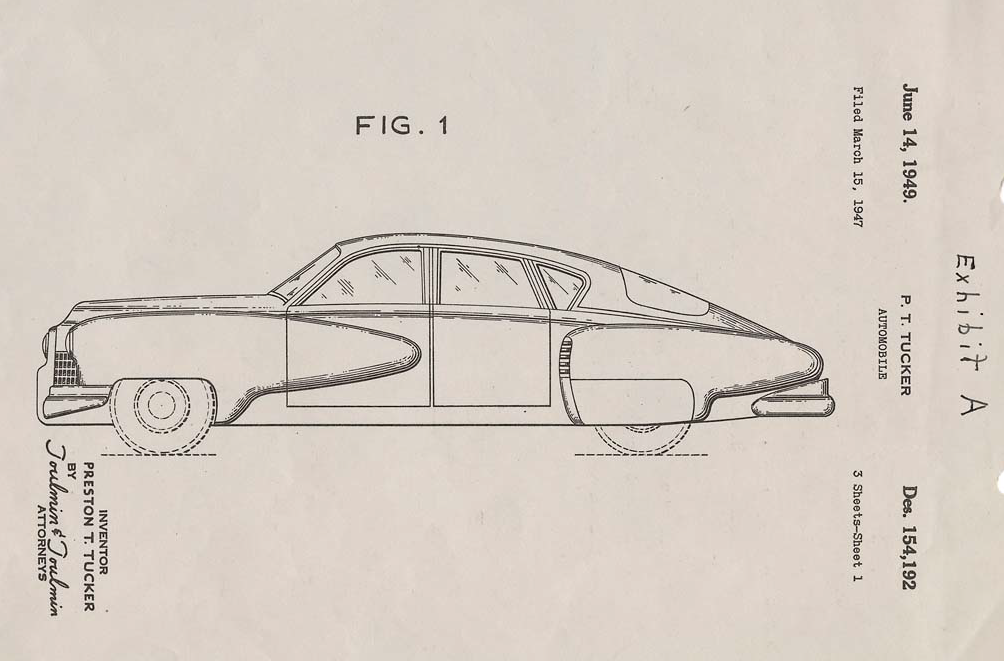
A Tucker 48 patent illustration

To finish the prototype design and get construction under way, Tucker hired famed stylist Alex Tremulis, previously of Auburn/Cord/Duesenberg, on December 24, 1946, and gave him just six days to finalize the design. On December 31, 1946, Tucker approved Tremulis's preliminary design. Tucker's future-car became known as the "Tucker Torpedo" from the first Lawson sketch; however, not desiring to bring to mind the horrors of WWII, Tucker quickly changed the name to the "Tucker 48". With Tremulis's design sketch, a full-page advertisement was run in March 1947 in many national newspapers claiming "How 15 years of testing produced the car of the year". Tucker said he had been thinking about the car for 15 years. The second advertisement described specifically many of the innovative features Tucker proposed for his car, many of which would not make it to the final car. This advertisement had the public very excited about this car, but Tucker had much work to do before a prototype was ready to be shown.

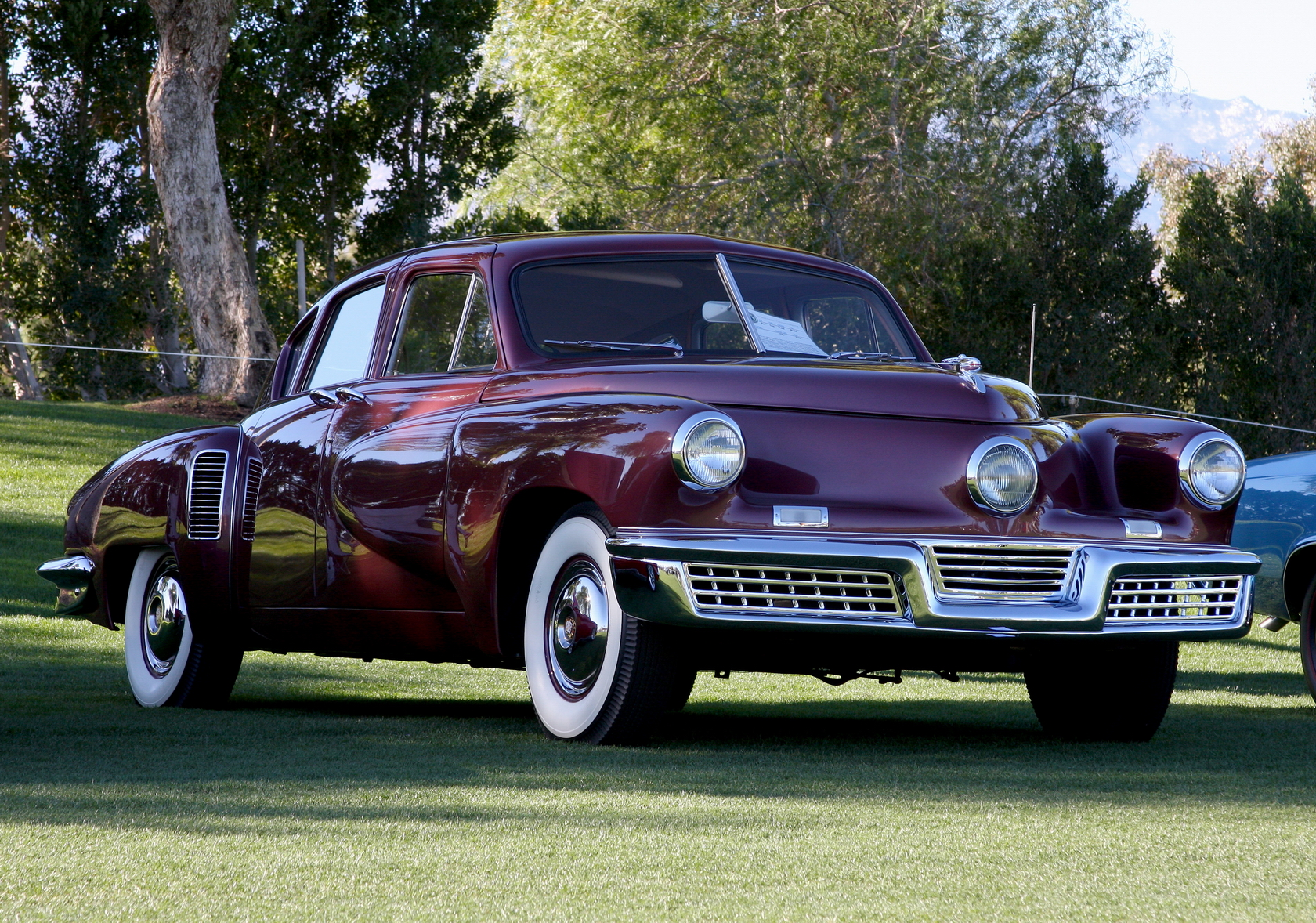
1948 Tucker Torpedo

To finalize the design, Tucker hired the New York design firm J. Gordon Lippincott to create an alternate body. Only the front end and horizontal taillight bar designs were retained for the final car. A sports car variant of the Tucker 48, the Tucker Talisman, was sketched as well but never left the drawing board.

To diversify his corporation, Tucker imported Italian engineer Secondo Campini, who was well known and respected in the aviation industry. He was put in charge of pursuing a United States Air Force development contract, hoping to use Tucker's huge Chicago factory to someday build more than just cars. Campini and Tucker also began developing plans for a gas turbine-powered car to be produced by Tucker.

The Tucker Export Corporation was also formed, based in New York, which was established as an entity to manage worldwide sales of Tucker's cars. Headed by Tucker's long-time friend, Colombian Max Garavito, distributorships were set up internationally, including South America and South Africa.

Tucker assembled a group of automotive industry leaders for Tucker Corporation, including:

Fred Rockelman; Tucker VP and Sales Director (Formerly president of Plymouth)
Hanson Brown; Executive VP (Formerly VP for General Motors)
KE Lyman; Development engineer (Formerly of Bendix Corporation and Borg-Warner)
Ben Parsons; Tucker engineering VP and chief engineer (International fuel injection expert)
Lee S. Treese; VP of manufacturing (Formerly a Ford executive)
Herbert Morley; (Borg-Warner plant manager)
Robert Pierce; VP and Treasurer (Formerly secretary of Briggs Manufacturing Company)

Tucker and his colleagues were able to obtain the largest factory building in the world, the 475-acre (1.92 km^{2}) Dodge Chicago Aircraft Engine Plant, which was later known as the Chicago Dodge Plant, from the War Assets Administration. The facility had previously been used to build the massive Wright R-3350 Cyclone engines for B-29 Superfortress aircraft during WWII. Tucker, thinking long-term, believed this large facility would fit his long-term goal of producing an entire line of Tucker automobiles under one roof.

Tucker signed the lease in July 1946, contingent on him raising $15 million in capital by March 1947. Tucker needed this money to get going, so he began raising money by selling dealership rights and floating a $20 million stock issue through the Chicago brokerage firm Floyd D. Cerf. With over $17 million in the bank by 1947, the Tucker Corporation was up and running.

While Tucker ultimately got the plant, he was not able to move in until September 1947 because of delays caused by counter-claims and disputes over the plant between Tucker and the Lustron Corporation. That delayed Tucker by almost a year, during which time development of the car continued at his Michigan machine shop. Tucker planned for 60,000 cars a year, with 140 per day produced for the first 4 months and 300 per day produced afterward.

Tucker suffered another setback when his bids to obtain two steel mills to provide raw materials for his cars were rejected by the WAA under a shroud of questionable politics.

Tucker's specifications for his revolutionary car called for a rear engine, a low-RPM 589 cu in (9.7 L) engine with hydraulic valves instead of a camshaft, fuel injection, direct-drive torque converters on each rear wheel (instead of a transmission), disc brakes, the location of all instruments within the diameter and reach of the steering wheel, a padded dashboard, self-sealing tubeless tires, independent springless suspension, a chassis that protected occupants in a side impact, a roll bar within the roof, a laminated windshield designed to pop out during an accident, and a center "cyclops" headlight which would turn when steering at angles greater than 10 degrees in order to improve visibility around corners during night driving.

While most of those innovations made it to the final 51 prototypes, several were dropped for their cost and the lack of time to develop such mechanically-complicated designs. The low-RPM 589-cubic-inch engine, individual torque converters, mechanical fuel injection, and the disc brakes were all dropped during the design and testing phase.

Having run out of time to develop the 589-cubic-inch engine for the car, Tucker ultimately settled on a modified 334 cu in (5.5 L) Franklin O-335 aircraft engine. He liked the engine so much he purchased its manufacturer, Aircooled Motors in New York, for $1.8 million in 1947, securing a guaranteed engine supply for his car.

== Turmoil surrounding Tucker Corporation (1946–1948) ==
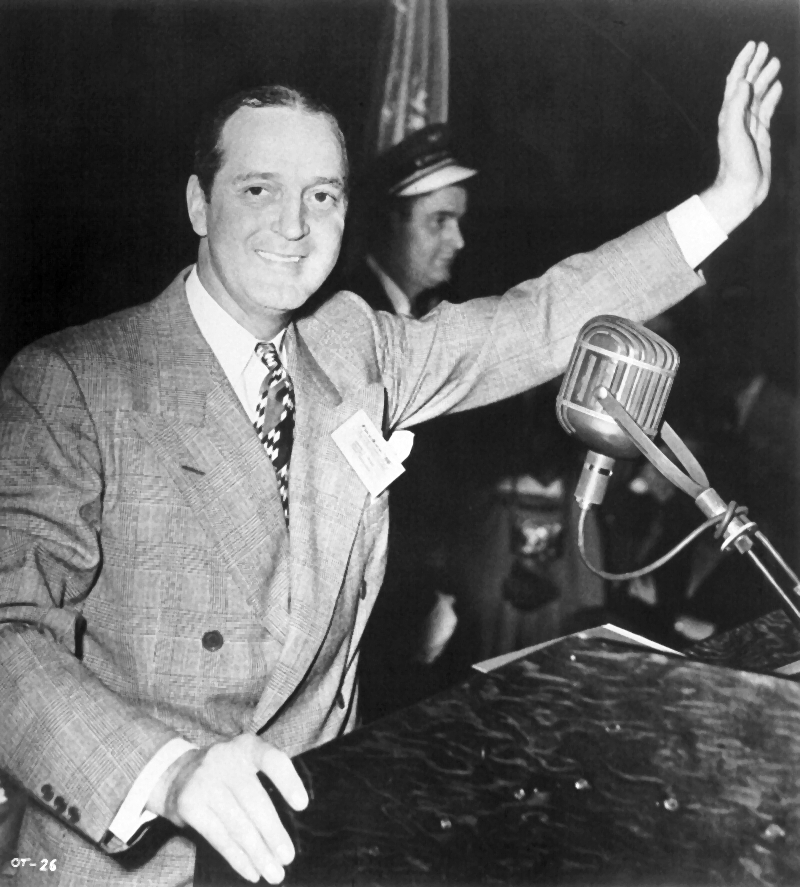
Preston Tucker waves to the crowd after speaking at a press conference.

The U.S. Securities and Exchange Commission bothered the Tucker Corporation from its earliest days. The SEC was embittered after small automaker Kaiser-Frazer was given millions of dollars in grants towards development of a new car, and subsequently squandered the money. While Tucker took no money from the federal government, small upstart automakers were under intense SEC scrutiny, and Tucker was no exception.

One of Tucker's most innovative business ideas caused the most trouble for the company and was used by the SEC to spark its formal investigation. His Accessories Program raised funds by selling accessories before the car was even in production. Potential buyers who purchased Tucker accessories were guaranteed a spot on the dealer waiting list for a Tucker '48 car. Tucker also began selling dealerships before the car was ready for production, and at the time of the trial had sold over 2,000 dealerships nationwide at a price of $7,500 to nearly $30,000 each.

Feeling pressure from the SEC, Harry Aubrey Toulmin Jr., the chairman of the Tucker board of directors, resigned and wrote a letter to the SEC on September 26, 1947, in an attempt to distance himself from the company. In the letter, Toulmin indicated that he quit "because of the manner in which Preston Tucker is using the funds obtained from the public through sale of stock." Describing Tucker as "a tall, dark, delightful, but inexperienced boy", Toulmin added that the Tucker 48 "does not actually run, it just goes 'goose-geese'" and "I don't know if it can back up." In reply, Tucker claimed that he had asked Toulmin to resign "to make way for a prominent man now active in the automobile industry"—himself.

In late 1947, a radio segment on Tucker by popular journalist Drew Pearson criticized the Tucker 48, calling it the "tin goose" (referring to Howard Hughes' Hughes H-4 Hercules, nicknamed the "Spruce Goose") and noting that the first prototype "could not even back up". The first prototype lacked a reverse gear because Tucker had not had time to finish the direct torque drive by the time of the car's unveiling. This was corrected in the final driveline, but the public damage was done and a negative media feeding frenzy resulted. Tucker responded by publishing a full-page advertisement in many national newspapers with "an open letter to the automobile industry" wherein he subtly hinted that his efforts to build the cars were being stymied by politics and an SEC conspiracy. Nonetheless, dealership owners began filing lawsuits to recover their money, and Tucker's stock value plummeted.

== SEC trial and demise of the Tucker Corporation (1949–1950) ==
In 1949, Tucker surrendered his corporate records to the SEC. United States Attorney Otto Kerner Jr. began a grand jury investigation in February 1949. On March 3, a federal judge handed control of the Tucker Corporation over to Aaron J. Colnon and John H. Schatz. Soon thereafter on June 10, Tucker and six other Tucker Corporation executives were indicted on 25 counts of mail fraud, five counts of violations of SEC regulations, and one count of conspiracy to defraud. The indictment included Tucker, 46; Harold A. Karsten, 58, "alias Abe Karatz"; Floyd D. Cerf, 61 (whose firm had handled the stock offering); Robert Pierce, 63; Fred Rockelman, 64; Mitchell W. Dulian, 50, Tucker sales manager; Otis Radford, 42, Tucker Corporation comptroller; and Cliff Knoble, 42, Tucker advertising manager.

Tucker publicly called the charges "silly and ridiculous" and hailed the indictment as "an opportunity to explain our side of the story". Tucker and his colleagues' defense was handled by a team of attorneys led by William T. Kirby.

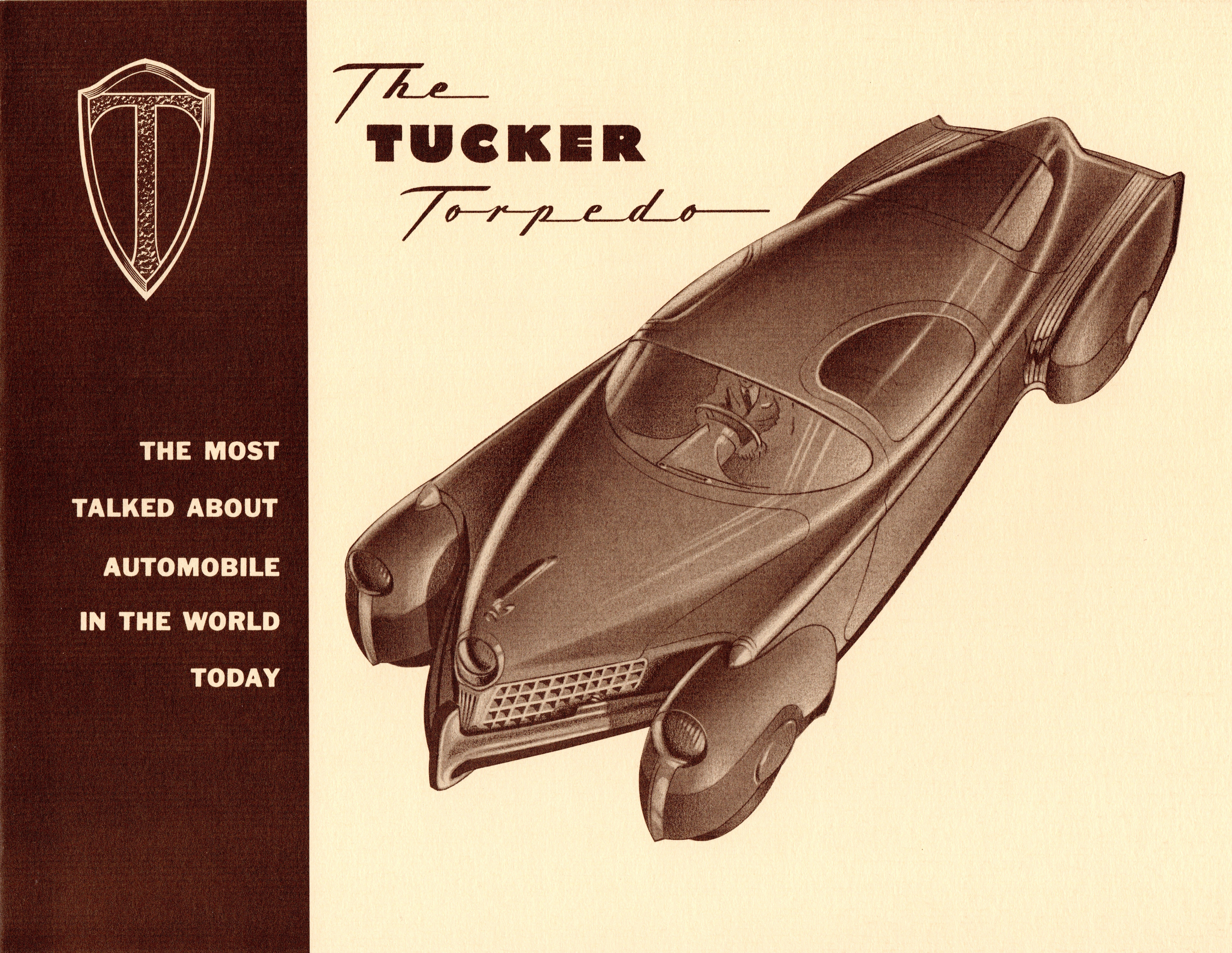
Tucker Torpedo brochure, 1947

Another publication, Collier's, ran an article critical of Tucker on June 25, 1949, which included leaked details of the SEC report (which was never released publicly). This article was reprinted in Reader's Digest as well, expanding the scope of the negative press concerning Preston Tucker.

The trial began on October 4, 1949, presided over by Judge Walter J. LaBuy. Tucker Corporation's factory was closed on the very same day. At that point, only 37 Tucker 48s had been built. A corps of 300 loyal employees returned to the factory (some without pay) and finished assembly of another 13 cars for a total production of 50 cars (not including the prototype).

At trial, the government contended that Tucker never intended to produce a car. Throughout the trial, the SEC report on Tucker was classified as "secret" and Tucker's attorneys were never allowed to view or read it, but it was leaked to the press nevertheless.

As the trial proceeded, the government and SEC brought several witnesses (mostly former Tucker employees) to highlight the rudimentary methods used by Tucker to develop the car; the early suspensions were installed three times before they worked, and early parts were taken from junkyards to build the prototype. Answering back in Tucker's defense, designer Alex Tremulis testified that it was common industry practice to use old car parts for prototype builds, and pointed out this had been done when he was involved with developing the 1942 Oldsmobile under General Motors.

Tucker Vice President Lee Treese testified that Tucker's metal stamping and parts fabrication operations were 90% ready to mass-produce the car by June 1948 and that outside interference had slowed the final preparations for production. This back and forth between the prosecution and the defense continued until November 8, 1949, when the judge demanded the SEC prosecutors "get down to the meat of the case and start proving the conspiracy charge."

Defense attorney Kirby directed attention to automaker Kaiser-Frazer, pointing out that early models of their government-funded new car model had been made of wood and that when this project failed, Kirby stated in court documents that "Kaiser-Frazer didn't get indicted, and they got 44 million dollars in loans from the government, didn't they?" All told Kaiser-Frazer had received nearly $200 million in government grants, but did not produce the car they promised.

After a break for Christmas, the trial resumed in January 1950. The government's star witness, Daniel J. Ehlenz, a former Tucker dealership owner and distributor from St. Paul, Minnesota, testified that he had lost $28,000 in his investment in the Tucker Corporation. However, on cross-examination, the defense used this witness to their advantage when Ehlenz testified that he still drove his Tucker 48 given to him by Tucker, and that the car had 35,000 miles (56,000 km) on it and still cruised smoothly at 90 miles per hour (140 km/h).

The tide turned in Tucker's favor when the government called its final witness, SEC accountant Joseph Turnbull, who testified that Tucker had taken in over $28 million and spent less than one-seventh of it on research and development of the car. He stated that Tucker had taken over $500,000 of the investors' money for himself, but never delivered a production car. Kirby rebutted Turnbull's claims on cross-examination, asking for proof of the allegations of financial mismanagement from Tucker's seized financial records. Turnbull was unable to offer such evidence. In closing his witness testimony, Kirby asked Turnbull, "You are not here suggesting these figures are figures of monies taken fraudulently, are you?" Turnbull's answer was, "Not exactly, no."

After this final SEC witness, Tucker's defense attorneys surprised everyone by refusing to call any witnesses to the stand. Defense attorney Daniel Glasser told the court, "It is impossible to present a defense when there has been no offense". In his closing arguments, Kirby became tearful and emotionally told the jury to "stop picking at the turkey", and stated that Tucker "either intended to cheat and that's all they intended to do or they tried in good faith to produce a car. The two are irreconcilable." He then invited the members of the jury to take a ride in one of the eight Tucker 48s parked in front of the courthouse before they made their decision.

On January 22, 1950, after 28 hours of deliberations, the jury returned a verdict of "not guilty" on all counts for all accused. Tucker had prevailed at the trial, but the Tucker Corporation, now without a factory, buried in debt, and faced with numerous lawsuits from Tucker dealers that were angry about the production delays, was effectively no more.

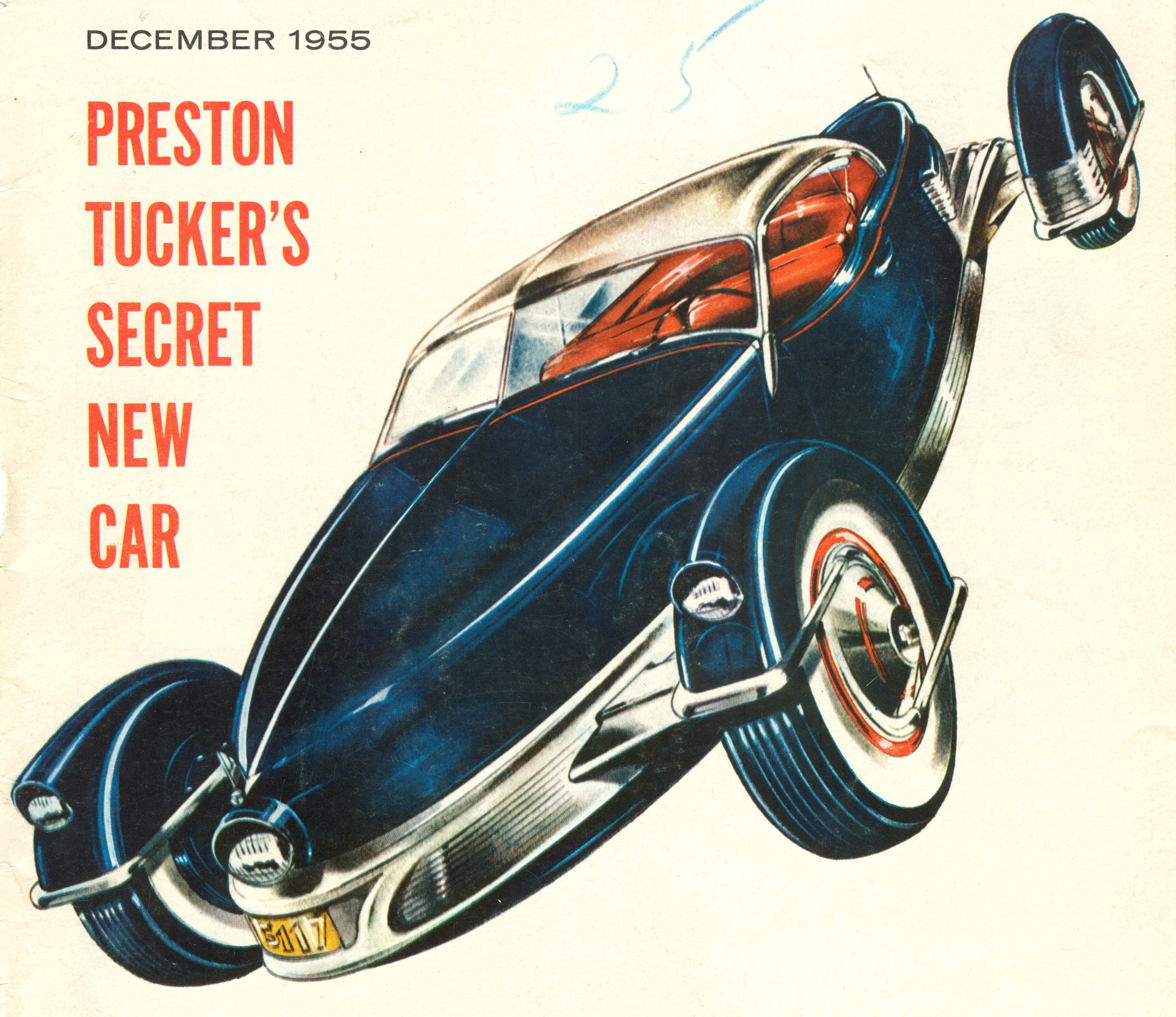
"Preston Tucker's Secret New Car," cover of 1955 magazine story about the Carioca. Tucker was quoted in the article: "I never gave up. I never will!"

== Speculation and controversy surrounding the Tucker Corporation ==
Despite the outcome of the trial, speculation has continued with regard to the question of whether Tucker genuinely intended to produce a new car and bring it to market, or whether the entire enterprise was a sham, designed for the sole purpose of collecting funds from gullible investors. Tucker collectors of the Tucker Automobile Club of America have amassed over 400,000 drawings, blueprints, corporate documents, and letters which they believe suggest that Tucker was, in fact, developing the manufacturing process necessary to mass-produce the Tucker 48. They also point to the fact that by the time of the investigation, Tucker had hired over 1,900 employees, including teams of engineers and machinists. At the trial, the Tucker VP Lee Treese testified that they were 90% ready with industrial machinery at the Chicago plant to mass-produce the vehicle.

== Later life and death (1950–1956) ==
Preston Tucker's reputation rebounded after the acquittal. After the trial was over, he was quoted as saying, "Even Henry Ford failed the first time out." Tucker Corporation assets were auctioned off publicly in Chicago. One remaining Tucker 48 car was given to Preston Tucker, and another to his mother.

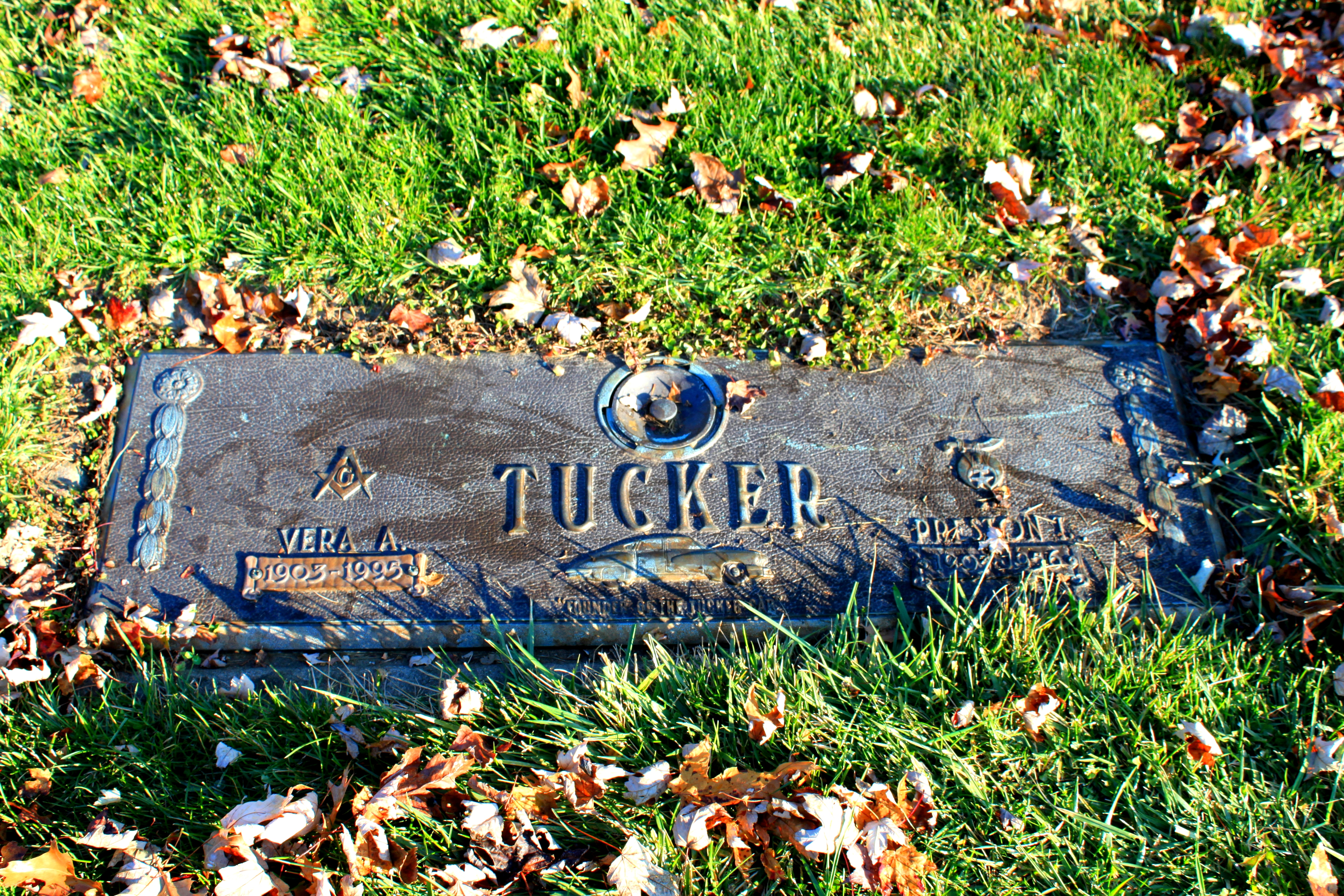
Preston Tucker grave marker

In the early 1950s, Tucker teamed up with investors from Brazil and auto designer Alexis de Sakhnoffsky to build a sports car called the Carioca. Tucker could not use the Tucker name for the car, as Peter Dun of Dun & Bradstreet had purchased the rights to the name, and the Tucker Carioca was ultimately never developed.

Tucker suffered from fatigue during his travels to Brazil, and upon his return to the United States he was diagnosed with lung cancer. Tucker died of pneumonia as a complication of lung cancer on December 26, 1956, at the age of 53. He is buried at Michigan Memorial Park in Flat Rock, Michigan.

== Legacy ==
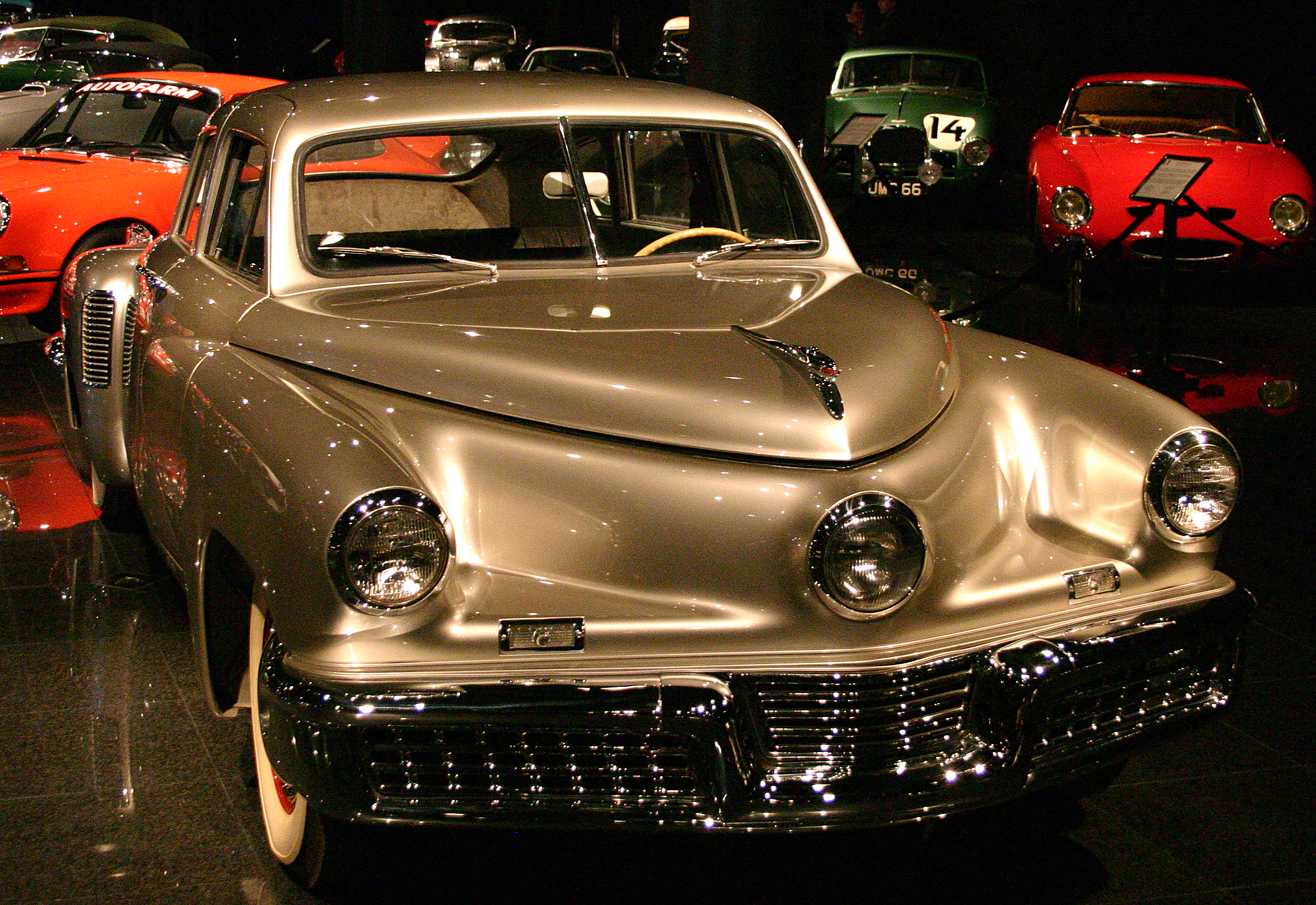
Tucker 48 at the Blackhawk Museum

In 1954, a group of investors tried to revive the Tucker Corporation by soliciting investors, mostly former Tucker distributors and dealer owners, for a new car. This effort was led by George A. Schmidt, former president of the Tucker Dealers Association. They developed sketches for a sleek 2-door convertible, but were unable to generate enough support to get it off the drawing board.

Tucker's defense attorney, William T. Kirby, later became chairman of the board of the John D. and Catherine T. MacArthur Foundation.

Otto Kerner Jr., the U.S. attorney who had prosecuted the Tucker Corporation case, later became the first federal appellate judge in U.S. history to be jailed. In 1974 Judge Kerner was convicted of bribery, conspiracy, perjury, and related charges for stock fraud. He was sentenced to three years in prison and fined $50,000.

The location of the former Tucker Corporation, 7401 S. Cicero Avenue in Chicago, became the corporate headquarters of Tootsie Roll Industries and the Ford City Mall (the building was owned for a time by Ford Motor Company). The building was so large that it was divided in two, with a large open area between the two resulting buildings.

Tucker's design concepts for the Tucker 48 included revolutionary ideas in car safety that helped formulate car safety standards. The Tucker family held on to Aircooled Motors until 1961, when it was sold to Aero Industries.

Well preserved Tucker 48 cars have sold to collectors for up to $3 million each. Original stock certificates for Tucker Corporation common stock have been purchased by collectors for more than their face value.
