= Armin Ganz =

American designer

- Born: March 26, 1948; Knoxville, Tennessee, United States
- Died: October 9, 1995 (aged 47); Sausalito, California, United States
- Occupation: Production designer
- Years active: 1984-1995

Armin Ganz (March 26, 1948 – October 9, 1995) was an American production designer. He was nominated for an Academy Award in the category Best Art Direction for the film Tucker: The Man and His Dream.

Ganz died of a heart attack on his houseboat in Sausalito.

== Selected filmography ==
- Tucker: The Man and His Dream (1988)
