= Ford Gyron =

Futuristic two-wheeled 1961 concept car

The Ford Gyron was a futuristic two-wheeled gyrocar first shown to the world in 1961 at the Detroit Motor Show as a concept car designed by Syd Mead and McKinley Thompson. One wheel was at the front and the other at the rear like a motorcycle and the car was stabilized by gyroscopes. The two occupants of the vehicle were seated side by side and, when the vehicle was stationary, two small legs appeared from the sides to support it. The vehicle was created for research and marketing purposes, with no intention to put it into production.

Alex Tremulis was the designer and the gyroscopic systems were based on Louis Brennan's theories. The Ford Motor Company of Detroit gave credit for the Gyron to Louis Brennan. Alex Tremulis had started his career with the US Air Force and worked in 1948 at the Wright-Patterson Air Force Base on the concept of Military flying saucers. He then became the chief designer for the ill-fated Tucker automobile before joining Ford, and was also involved with the Tuscan gyroscopic motorcycles and the Gyronaught XU1 gyroscopic car.

The original fiberglass concept was destroyed in the 1962 Ford Rotunda fire. Only the studio model remains today; it was sold at an auction in December 2012 for $40,000. A second model was recently discovered in the collection of the Petersen Automotive Museum in Los Angeles and displayed as part of the 2024 exhibition, "Eyes on the Road."
