= Tucker gun turret =

Electrically powered gun turret

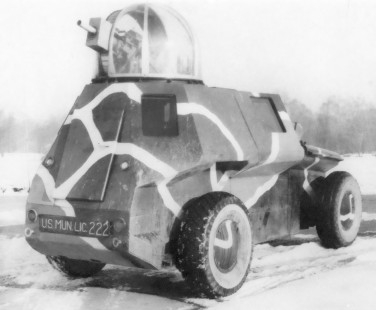
The Tucker armored combat car. Note the Tucker Turret.

The Tucker gun turret was a fast-traversing electrically powered gun turret widely described as having been mounted on World War II bombers and on some ground vehicles and small naval vessels like US Navy PT boats. American industrialist Preston Tucker first developed the turret for the experimental Tucker armored car in 1938.

Steve Lehto in his biography of Tucker asserts that it is a misconception that Tucker's turret was widely used on US bombers during the war. He states that different manufacturers were each assigned contracts to develop different turrets for different planes, and that Tucker's firm was to build turrets for the Douglas B-18 Bolo. In the end no Tucker turrets equipped any bombers.

When Tucker was under investigation by the Security and Exchange Commission, a half-hour film entitled Tucker: The Man and his Car was prepared and shown to the Commission members. Lehto described the film's narrator "gushing" over Tucker and noted: "A short section on his wartime efforts to create the Tucker Combat Car introduced the Tucker Turret and may have been the source of the myth that his turrets were widely used during the war."

A Hollywood biopic of Tucker covered Tucker's production of the turret, prompting reviewers to characterize the turret design as "incredibly ergonomic, effective and convenient".
