= Dodge Chicago Plant =

World War II defense plant

Coordinates: 41°45′31″N 87°43′55″W

The Dodge Chicago Aircraft Engine Plant was a World War II defense plant that built the majority of the B-29 bomber aircraft engines used in World War II.

The plant design was initiated by automotive plant designer Albert Kahn and his company. The plant is seen as an influential design landmark of American industrial manufacturing facilities. The main building of the Dodge Chicago plant covered eighty-two acres and occupied over 30 city blocks, and at the time was the largest building in the world. Although Kahn died prior to the completion of the project, he was influential in the innovative design that efficiently used precious wartime materials used in its construction. Kahn had extensive tunnels dug to facilitate foot and supply traffic. These tunnels span the width and breadth of the plant in a tic-tac-toe pattern. Wooden block floors were placed for ergonomic reasons, which was typical for industrial plants of the day. These floors were cemented over when the facility was converted into Ford City Mall, and only recently had to be removed from TRI (candy maker Tootsie Roll Industries) as posing a potential health hazard. The Belt Line Railroad shunted lines into the plant, and to this day evidence of the rails remain. Construction of the plant was started in 1942, and it was in full operation by early 1944.

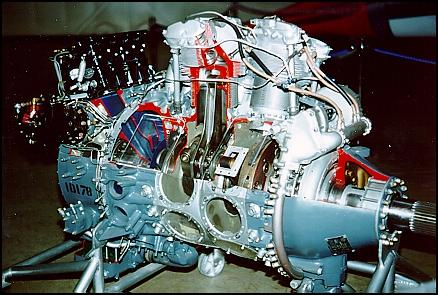
sectionalized view of a Wright - Cyclone engine

The B-29 Superfortress bomber was used in the strategic bombing campaign against Japan. It was the largest American aircraft to see service in World War II. Each B-29 Superfortress used four of the massive Wright R-3350 - Cyclone 18-cylinder 2,200 horsepower (1,600 kW) engines built at the Dodge Chicago Plant. There were nearly 4000 of these aircraft produced when the B-29 was retired from service in the 1960s. Many firsts in industry took place there. Chemist Lencke produced Z-max lubricant. 75% of the employees were women, 1 to 2 percent of whom were African Americans. The Dodge Chicago plant marked an all-time high water mark of cooperation and success between the efforts of the American government, industry, and labor. It also set an early standard for providing an environment of racial and ethnic cooperation and tolerance. After the war, a lease for the plant was awarded to the Tucker Car Corporation, and it later used by several automobile manufacturers including Ford Motor Company. Tootsie Roll Industries moved into a vacated portion of the plant in 1967. To this day, TRI uses these tunnels for archives and storage as well as locker rooms, as Ford City uses them for a strip of boutiques. The plant was constructed just east of South Cicero Avenue and was a half-mile long from 72nd Street to 76th Street, and nearly a half-mile wide, reaching South Kostner Avenue in Chicago's West Lawn community. To this day, the northern two-thirds of its buildings still house the Tootsie Roll factory, and a section that was demolished for a parking lot which separates Tootsie Roll from the Ford City Mall.
