= McKinley Thompson Jr. =

American industrial designer (1922–2006)

McKinley William Thompson Jr. (November 8, 1922 – March 8, 2006) was the first African American automotive designer, and he was the first African American Designer to work at the Ford Motor Company. Thompson was a designer on the first generation Ford Bronco, and also was a designer on the first generation Ford Mustang, Ford Thunderbird, and Ford GT40 racing car. His career at the Ford Motor Company spanned 28 years, from 1956 to 1984.

== Background ==
McKinley William Thompson Jr. was born in Queens, New York. As a child, he showed great interest in cars. He attended Murray Hill High School in New York City, where he graduated in 1940. In 1941, Thompson joined the U.S. Army, he served during WWII as an engineering design layout coordinator for the Army Signal Corps. After the war, Thompson worked in the Signal Corps until 1953.

In 1953, he applied to a scholarship competition called From Dream to Drawing Board to?, for the Art Center College of Design that was hosted by Motor Trend magazine. He won first place in the competition and became the first African American to attend the school. Thompson graduated in 1956 and subsequently began working at the Ford Motor Company, hired by Alex Tremulis.

== Ford and the Bronco ==
In 1956, Thompson started working in what was known as Ford's "Advanced Studio" under Alex Tremulis where Thompson helped develop numerous automotive concepts. A notable example was the controversial Ford Gyron, which was revealed at the Detroit Auto Show in 1961. In 1962, he was awarded the Citizen of The Year award by the mayor of Detroit, Jerome Cavanaugh. In 1963, Thompson began conceptual sketches along with other designers for the Ford Bronco, which was to compete with the existing Jeep CJ-5 and International Scout. He completed sketches that would prove to be influential to the final design of the first generation Bronco.

== The Warrior ==
Thompson proposed an idea to Ford in 1965 for an all-terrain vehicle, it was initially the first of series of cars that would serve developing nations in Africa. The Warrior's main purpose was to help the advancements of economies, transportation, and address the needs in third world countries. McKinley Thompson envisioned the Warrior being a cost efficient car in order to be mass produced, the mass production of the Warrior would help third world countries with job opportunities. The Warrior was planned to be made of Royalex plastic. Ford declined to work on the project in 1967, when they believed the car would not sell enough units to make a profit for the company. Thompson ultimately decided to build it in his garage. He built a prototype based on the Renault R-10 in 1969, and continued working on the prototype into the 1970s. Planning on the Warrior stopped in 1979.

== Cougar Concept II ==
The Cougar II concept was designed as a competitor to the Chevrolet Corvette and introduced to the public in 1963. The Cougar II was showcased at the Chicago Auto Show that same year and the following two years at the New York World's Fair exhibition. Using the frame of the Shelby Cobra, the Cougar II housed a V8 engine, fiberglass body, and retractable headlamps. Ultimately, it was never manufactured because it was determined to be too costly for Ford.

== Death ==
After retiring from Ford in 1984, Thompson moved to Arizona. He died at 83 in Arizona on March 5, 2006 from Parkinson's disease.
