= Alex Tremulis =

American industrial designer (1914–1991)

- Born: Alexander Sarantos Tremulis; January 23, 1914; Chicago, Illinois, U.S.
- Died: December 29, 1991 (aged 77); Ventura, California, U.S.
- Resting place: Ivy Lawn Memorial Park
- Citizenship: United States
- Occupation: Industrial designer

Alexander Sarantos Tremulis (January 23, 1914 – December 29, 1991) was an American industrial designer in the North American automotive industry. Tremulis held automotive design positions at Cord Automobile, Duesenberg, General Motors, Tucker Car Corporation, and Ford Motor Company before establishing a consulting firm.

== Early career ==
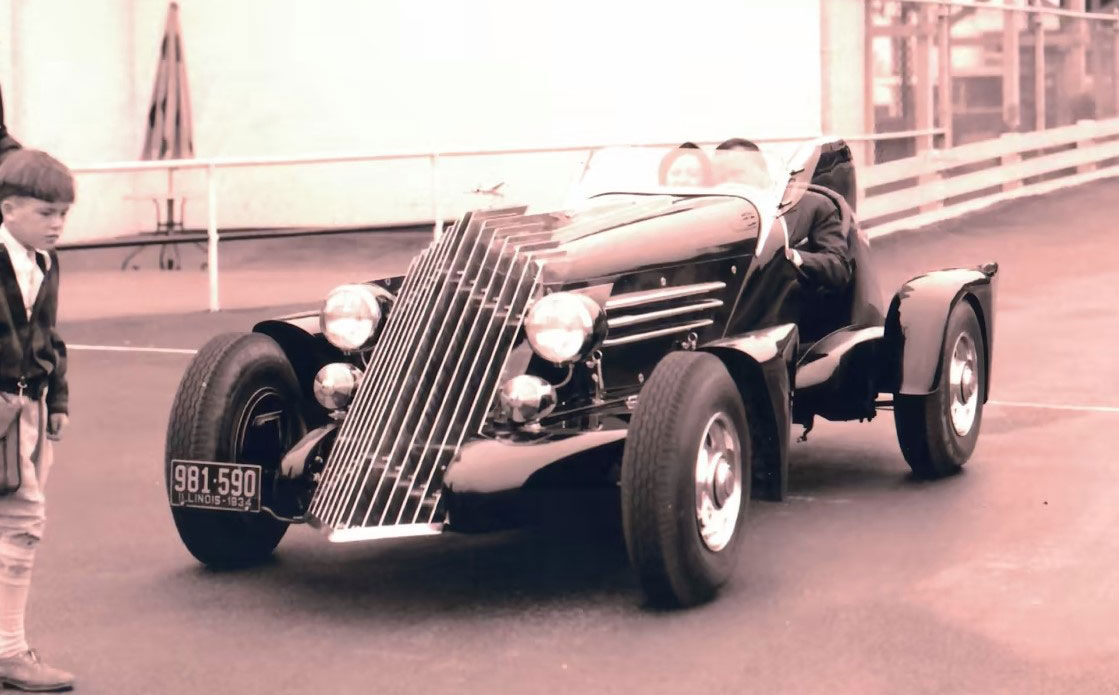
Chevrolet-based prototype attributed to Alex Tremulis (1933)

Tremulis was the son of Antonia and Sarantos Tremulis, Greek immigrants from a village near Sparta.

In 1933, at 19 years old, Tremulis designed and helped build a radical custom Chevrolet for Chicago vaudeville comedian Ralph Cook. The car, with its long pointed hood and distinctive vertical grille resembling a church organ, was shown at the Century of Progress (Chicago World's Fair, 1933–1934). Its futuristic lines and exaggerated proportions drew attention for being decades ahead of contemporary styling. Among the visitors was designer Gordon Buehrig of Auburn-Cord-Duesenberg, who, impressed by Tremulis’ work, offered him a position on his design team. This project is often cited as the true beginning of Tremulis’ professional career in the automotive industry.

Among his other projects were the Cord 810 and 812 series, as well as a custom Duesenberg roadster with convertible and hardtop options. In 1936, he was named Chief Stylist for Auburn-Cord-Duesenberg and remained in that role until the company failed in 1937.

Tremulis briefly worked for General Motors before moving to Briggs-Le Baron, a custom coachbuilder for Chrysler at the time. In 1938, he worked for Custom Motors in Beverly Hills, California, which made unique cars for movie stars. He was also a consultant for Crosley and American Bantam in 1939. His designs for American Bantam remained in production until the firm switched entirely to the production of military Jeeps before World War II. Returning to Briggs in 1939, he worked with Werner Gubitz and Howard "Dutch" Darrin to design the production versions of the Packard Clipper. He was also the creative source for the 1941 Chrysler "Thunderbolt" concept car. His contributions to these two models helped establish styling trends that would influence automobile designs after World War II.

== Air Corps concepts ==
After Pearl Harbor was bombed in 1941, Tremulis joined the United States Army Air Forces. He worked on advanced aircraft concepts at Wright Field (now Wright-Patterson Air Force Base) and developed an idea, which in the 1960s became known as the Boeing Dyna-Soar, a gliding re-entry space vehicle. While at the Air Corps, he made the first speculative drawings of what extraterrestrial life forms would use as transportation to visit the Earth. His concept drawings were the first saucer-shaped spacecraft drawings documented.

== Later career ==
After the War, Tremulis worked with the design firm of Tammen & Denison until Preston Tucker hired him to design the 1948 Tucker Sedan. As Phil Egan described in his book, "Design and Destiny: The Making of the Tucker Automobile", it was Tremulis who was primarily responsible for guiding the fabrication of the "Tin Goose" to conclusion. The first production Tucker automobiles were powered by a converted Franklin helicopter engine supplied by Air Cooled Motors. Carl Doman, an engineer with Air Cooled, built a higher output engine, 275 horsepower (205 kW) versus 166 horsepower (168 PS), but was voted down by management, who felt the car was fast enough. The higher horsepower engine was for a future model called the Talisman, for which both Alex Tremulis and his assistant, Phil Egan, would eventually draw up proposals. Those designs never came to fruition.

After his stint at Tucker, Tremulis worked briefly at Kaiser-Frazer under Arnot B. "Buzz" Grisinger, chief designer at Kaiser, who later become head of the Lincoln Design Studio at Ford, where Tremulis also worked starting in 1957. While at Ford Tremulis, a man who admired simplicity, was known for satirizing the gaudy 1958 Oldsmobile by drawing notes onto the four long horizontal trim strips on its rear flanks, making it look rather like a musical staff. While at Kaiser-Frazer, he also worked with former Chrysler designer Herb Weissinger, whom he greatly admired for his sculptural design clay modeling skills.

In 1957, as a Ford employee, Tremulis was assigned the task of designing the car that "he believed we would be driving in the year 2000". Tremulis drew up plans and made a clay model of the Ford X-2000, a concept that would later be brought to life as a working prototype in 1999 by UK customizer Andy Saunders, who showed it at car shows in 1999 and 2000. Tremulis designed the 1962 Ford Seattle-ite XXI concept car for the Seattle World's Fair.

Tremulis left Ford in 1963 to establish his consulting firm in Ann Arbor, Michigan. Among Tremulis' last designs was the 1978 Subaru BRAT.

Tremulis was a consultant for the 1988 film Tucker: The Man and His Dream, in which Elias Koteas portrayed him. Tremulis was also a frequent contributor to Road & Track magazine.

== Death ==
Tremulis died on December 29, 1991. He was buried at Ivy Lawn Memorial Park in Ventura, California.

== Awards ==
- 1982 — Distinguished Service Citation Award
- 2014 — Inducted into the Automobile Hall of Fame
- 1987 — Honored by the Society of Automotive Engineers for the design of the Tucker, as one of the "significant automobiles of the past half century."

== See also ==
- Ford Gyron
