= Royalex =

Composite material

Royalex was a composite material, comprising an outer layer of vinyl and hard acrylonitrile butadiene styrene plastic (ABS) and an inner layer of ABS foam. The layers are bonded by heat treatment. Developed by Uniroyal in the 1970s, it was used to manufacture durable, mid-priced canoes. Its supplier closed out production of the material in 2014.

== Properties ==
ABS is a copolymer of rubber and thermoplastic: acrylonitrile, butadiene, and styrene. Royalex is basically a board comprising a 'sandwich' of standard rigid ABS sheets, with an ABS layer in the core designed to foam/expand during the heating stage prior to vacuum forming. Thus Royalex can be designed to form virtually any finished thickness to suit the end application by adding extra sheets. Since ABS has a poor resistance to UV, a thin outer layer of UV resistant vinyl is generally included. This can be self-coloured or painted.

Royalex is extremely tough but if hit hard enough could be dented. If this happened, such dents could be recovered by applying a hand held hot-air gun which re-expanded the core to blow out the dent.

== History ==
It was developed at US Rubber Company's Chicago plant by Bob Pooley and was simply called Royalite. US Rubber was later renamed Uniroyal - a blanket name to encapsulate their worldwide enterprises, which previously had separate names. Later, Bob Pooley and associates continued work on Royalite to introduce a foaming/expandable element. This was accomplished at the Uniroyal plant in Warsaw, Indiana. The resulting product was named Royalex to recognise the expanding core.

Although extremely versatile as well as being very tough, the material was expensive compared to available alternatives. Even so, many industries were attracted to evaluate Royalex. Items produced included caravans (vacuum formed in two halves) the top was a mirror image of the base so that only one forming tool was required. White Motor Company introduced a limited run of tractor cabs. A company was formed to produce a reproduction of the famous 'Coffin nosed' Cord 810/812.

Gene Bordinat, Chief Designer at Ford, designed a concept car in Royalex in 1965. This resulted in the Ford XP Bordinat Cobra. The writer brought both of these cars to London, England, to show at the International Plastics Exhibition and for exposure to the then extensive automotive producers.

But its cost, as well as the need to accost a different build technique when using Royalex, mitigated against its acceptance in large scale production and eventually simple canoe bodies became the main product. An additional reason was that following the breakup of the Uniroyal empire, product specialists were lost and there was no longer a team to drive the concept.

In 2000 the Spartech Corporation took over the Uniroyal Royalex Manufacturing Division and secured the rights to manufacture Royalex at their factory in Warsaw, Indiana. In 2013, plastics company PolyOne, of Avon Lake, Ohio, purchased Spartech, and decided to shut down Royalex production due to its low volume. The last sheets of Royalex were shipped from the factory in December, 2013. Production was shut down in April 2014.

T-Formex, an equivalent to Royalex, has been developed and is manufactured by the canoe manufacturer Esquif. Canoes in the material are available from Esquif and several other manufacturers, including Swift and Wenonah.

== Uses ==
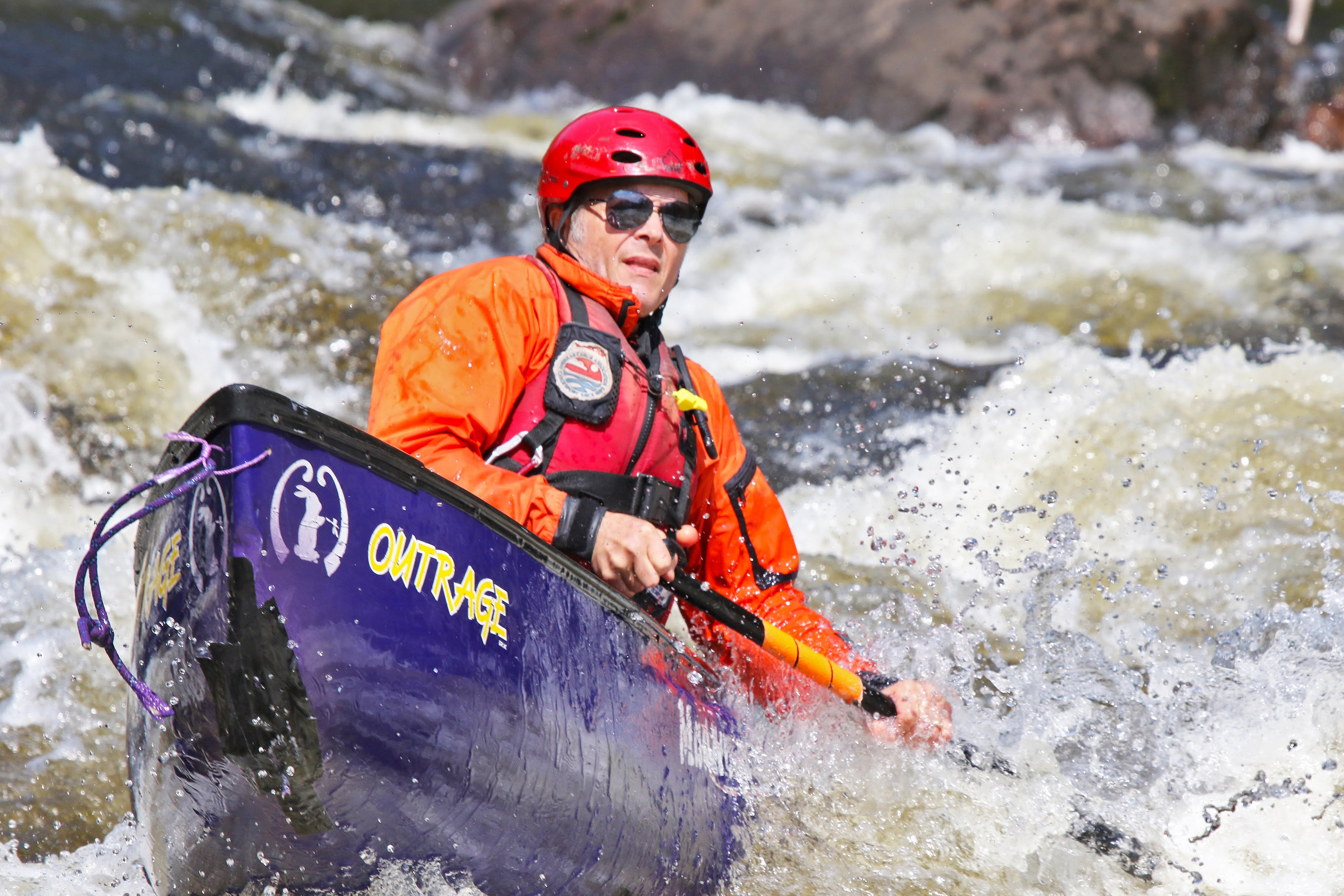
A whitewater canoeist paddling a Royalex canoe.

The best known use of Royalex is for the manufacture of canoe hulls. Royalex is lighter, more resistant to UV damage from sunlight, more rigid and has greater structural memory than non-composite plastics used for this purpose, such as polyethylene. It is also quieter and more user friendly in cold or hot conditions than aluminium, described by canoeist Kent Ford as "noisy, heavy and hot. "Royalex was soft, quiet and slippery on rocks, and not too heavy if you kept the gunwales light,” according to Kent Ford. " Royalex canoes are, however, more expensive than aluminium canoes or canoes made from traditionally molded or roto-molded polyethylene hulls.

Royalex cannot be made as light as fiber-reinforced composites made with Kevlar or carbon fiber, and therefore less suited for high-performance paddling. However, Royalex is cheaper than Kevlar or carbon fiber, with better durability on rocky rivers.
