= Steve Lehto =

American attorney

- Born: Steve Lehto; January 1962 (age 64); U.S.
- Education: Oakland University Southwestern University Law School
- Occupations: Lawyer and YouTuber
- Employer: Law Office of Steve Lehto
- Website: lehtoslaw.com

Steve Lehto is an American attorney, professor, author and YouTuber, known for consumer protection and lemon law litigation in Michigan. Lehto has taught at the University of Detroit Mercy as an adjunct professor. He is an alumnus of Oakland University having earned a bachelor's degree in history and his Juris Doctor from Southwestern University Law School in Los Angeles. Lehto "has been featured on CNN, the BBC, and Good Morning America. He is the author of several notable books."

== Early life and education ==
Lehto grew up in the Keweenaw Peninsula in the Upper Peninsula of Michigan. He is the youngest of six children and comes from a family of Finnish descent. During high school he worked at a gas station in Birmingham.

== Professional career ==
=== Legal practice ===
Lehto was admitted to practice law in Michigan on November 5, 1991. He has been interviewed on news stories about consumer and auto case law. In 2020, Lehto was selected one of the Super Lawyers in Michigan.

Lehto did pro bono work for hot rod owners who attended the Woodward Dream Cruise in Royal Oak, Michigan who were ticketed for a vehicular noise ordinance. At the time the Royal Oak police had issued over 150 tickets in Royal Oak District court. in 1997 he defended almost 50 people and 20 people for free.

=== Radio broadcasting ===
Lehto started his radio career at WWCK as a disc jockey in Flint. He worked as a radio talkshow host. He hosted his shows Lehto's Law on WFDF-AM (910 kHz) out of Flint, Michigan.

=== YouTube ===
Lehto has a YouTube channel named Steve Lehto with 619,000 subscribers as of February 15, 2026. He also has a second YouTube channel named Steve Lehto Vault, with videos that don't fit into his other channel; it has 20,900 subscribers as of March 3, 2024. In addition to his YouTube channel, Steve has done a show called LetoLive on MyMichiganTV.

=== Writing ===
Lehto wrote several articles for Jalopnik and Opposite Lock. He has published several books. He also contributed to the HuffPost Contributor platform.

Death's Door: The Truth Behind Michigan's Largest Mass Murder was mentioned on The Tonight Show. Jay Leno also wrote the foreword for Lehto's books "Chrysler's Turbine Car: The Rise and Fall of Detroit's Coolest Creation" and "Preston Tucker and His Battle to Build the Car of Tomorrow.", This book also was listed as one of the 2007 Michigan Notable Books by the Library of Michigan.

"Preston Tucker and His Battle to Build the Car of Tomorrow" by Steve Lehto, Chicago Review Press was listed as one of the 2017 Michigan Notable Books.

Chrysler's Turbine Car: The Rise and Fall of Detroit's Coolest Creation by Steve Lehto, Chicago Review Press was listed as one of the 2011 Michigan Notable Books by the Library of Michigan.

Lehto's book "Michigan's Columbus: The Life of Douglass Houghton" by Steve Lehto, Momentum Books was listed as one of Library of Michigan 2010 Michigan Notable Books.

== Works ==
- Lehto, Steve (November 1, 2022). American Murder Houses: A Coast-to-Coast Tour of the Most Notorious Houses of Homicide. Berkley. p. 305. ISBN 978-0593547878.
- Lehto, Steve (April 1, 2018). Preston Tucker and His Battle to Build the Car of Tomorrow. Chicago Review Press. p. 272. ISBN 978-0912777733.
- Lehto, Steve (February 4, 2016). Dodge Daytona and Plymouth Superbird: Design, Development, Production and Competition. Car Tech. p. 204. ISBN 978-1613252048.
- Lehto, Steve (June 1, 2013). Death's Door: The Truth Behind the Italian Hall Disaster and the Strike of 1913 (Second ed.). Momentum Books. ISBN 978-1-938018-03-9.
- Lehto, Steve (May 1, 2013). The Great American Jet Pack: The Quest for the Ultimate Individual Lift Device. Chicago Review Press. ISBN 978-1613744307.
- Timothy Masters; Steve Lehto (June 5, 2012). Drawn to Injustice: The Wrongful Conviction of Timothy Masters. Berkley. p. 448. ISBN 978-0425247921.
- Lehto, Steve (May 1, 2012). Chrysler's Turbine Car: The Rise and Fall of Detroit's Coolest Creation. Chicago Review Press. p. 256. ISBN 978-1613743454.
- Lehto, Steve (December 2011). The New Lemon Law Bible: Everything the Smart Consumer Needs to Know about Automobile Law. Createspace Independent Publishing Platform. p. 102. ISBN 9781468046489.
- Lehto, Steve (August 4, 2011). Coin Shooting: Finding Small Treasures with a Metal Detector. Kindle Scribe.
- Lehto, Steve (May 4, 2011). Bobby Isaac: NASCAR's First Modern Champion. p. 500.
- Lehto, Steve (April 7, 2009). Michigan's Columbus: The Life of Douglass Houghton. Momentum Books. p. 176. ISBN 978-1879094857.
- Lehto, Steve (October 9, 2007). Italian Hall: The Official Transcript of the Coroner's Inquest. Momentum Books. p. 196. ISBN 978-1879094802.
- Lehto, Steve (November 1, 2006). Death's Door: The Truth Behind Michigan's Largest Mass Murder. Momentum Books, LLC. p. 232. ISBN 978-1879094772.
